= Djafar Syah of Tidore =

Djafar Syah

Sultan of Tidore
- Reign: 1999-2012
- Predecessor: Interregnum (preceded by Zainal Abidin Alting)
- Successor: Husain Syah
- Born: 2 February 1940; Soasiu, Tidore
- Died: 13 April 2012 (aged 72)
- Father: Dano Junus
- Religion: Islam

Sultan Haji Djafar Syah (born in Soasiu, Tidore Sultanate, 2 February 1940 – died in Jakarta, 13 April 2012) was the titular Sultan of Tidore from 1999 to 2012. He was the 36th ruler of the island kingdom according to traditional reckoning, and revived the sultanate as a cultural institution after a long vacancy since 1967. The beginning of his term was turbulent since it coincided with the Maluku sectarian conflict in 1999–2001. However, Tidore Island was largely spared from the violence.

== Installation as Sultan ==
Djafar Dano Junus was born in 1940 as the son of Haji Junus, a great-grandson of Sultan Nuku of Tidore. His brothers were Yusuf and Amiruddin. The last ruling Sultan Zainal Abidin Alting died in 1967, at the beginning of Suharto's Orde Baru (New Order). In the increasingly centralized Indonesian state there was little or no room for hereditary rulers, and the Sultan position was left vacant. In the 1990s there was nevertheless a movement to revive the local cultural traditions, especially since the neighbouring Ternate had unofficially enthroned a titular Sultan in 1986. As the descendant of the celebrated anti-colonial hero Nuku, Djafar was pointed out as candidate for the throne. After the fall of Suharto in 1998 and the democratization of the political system, a wave of cultural revivalism swept through Indonesia where the traditional kingdoms of Maluku took part. Sultan Djafar Syah was enthroned at Soninge Salaka field on 18 October 1999 (8 Rajab 1420 H).

== Sectarian violence ==
However, stability in the Maluku region was threatened by hardening sectarian division and mobilization, aggravated by the new administrative division in the separate provinces of Maluku and North Maluku that was scheduled for September 1999. Fighting between Christians and Muslims broke out in Halmahera in August and October 1999, resulting in an exodus of Muslim refugees to Ternate and Tidore. The arrival of the refugees led to agitation and rumours, unleashing attacks on the Protestants on the two islands in November. The violence in turn caused mobilization by the armed followers of Sultan Mudaffar Sjah of Ternate, and of his rivals for the governorship of North Maluku, including Sultan Djafar Syah and an Islamic politician in Halmahera. Now the Protestants of Ternate and Tidore fled for areas in North Halmahera and North Sulawesi with Christian majorities. The disturbances in North Maluku went on until 2001.

== Reconstruction of tradition ==
During his tenure, Sultan Djafar Syah collaborated with the City District Government and the Provincial Government, resulting in the construction of the Kadato Kie (palace), Sultan's Mosque (Sigi Kolano) and Sultan's Wharf. In 2000 the Sultan ran for a seat in the North Maluku Regional Representative Office. In fact he won a significant number of votes and sat in the parliament for one term. Djafar Syah again ran for the next term again but failed to win a seat. The royal palace (kadato) in Tidore had been ruined in 1912, but Djafar Syah began construction of a new Kadato Kie in 2002 with an initial fund of Rp. 500,000,000, being assistance from the Acting Governor of North Maluku, SH Sarundajang. The Kadato Kie took nine years to complete (2002-2010). Not long after the inauguration, the Sultan died from a liver illness on 13 April 2012 in Jakarta at the Husada Bakti Hospital. His body was returned to Tidore on 14 April, and buried in the grave complex of Sultan Nuku with a grand royal ceremony.

Although he had sons, Sultan Djafar Syah was succeeded by Husain Syah, belonging to another branch of the Sultan's family. The dignity of Sultan is not strictly hereditary in Tidore, but the candidate is chosen by the local headmen from any of the four dynastic branches descended from Sultan Saifuddin (d. 1687).

== See also ==
- List of rulers of Maluku
- Sultanate of Tidore

Djafar Syah of Tidore
Preceded by Interregnum	Sultan of Tidore; 1999-2012	Succeeded by Husain Syah
