= Husain Syah of Tidore =

Husain Syah
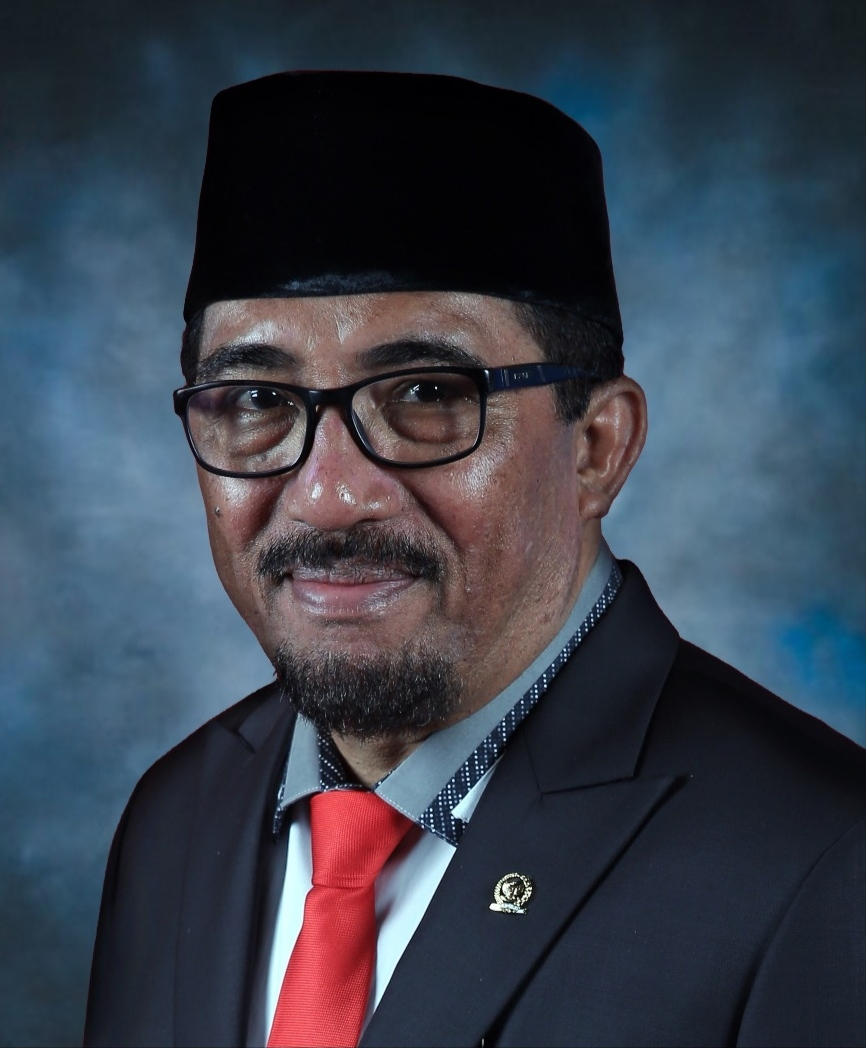
- Portrait of Husain Syah of Tidore as member of Regional Representative Council

Sultan of Tidore
- Incumbent
- Assumed office 2014–present
- Preceded by: Djafar Syah

Senator for North Maluku
- In office 1 October 2019 – 1 October 2024

Personal details
- Born: 1 March 1964 (age 61); Ternate, North Maluku
- Parent: Abubakar Alting (father)

Sultan Haji Husain Syah (born in Ternate, North Maluku, 1 March 1964) has been the titular Sultan of Tidore since 2014. He is the 37th ruler of the island in the traditional reckoning.

Husain Alting was born in 1964 as the son of Abubakar Alting, a descendant of Sultan Ahmad Saifuddin Alting (died 1865). This branch of the Tidore royal dynasty is named after Governor-General Willem Arnold Alting (died 1800). The Tidore Sultanate lapsed in 1967 with the demise of the last ruling Sultan, his distant relative Zainal Abidin Alting. However, the monarchy was revived as a cultural institution in 1999 when Djafar Syah was enthroned in distressed outer circumstances. Under Djafar's tenure, Husain Alting held the title Kapita Laut (a Portuguese-Malay expression literally meaning sea captain). As such he was active during the Maluku sectarian conflict between 1999 and 2001 and led a group of traditional dignitaries in a peace mission in Halmahera. After the death of Sultan Djafar Syah in 2012, the local headmen appointed Husain, who is not closely related to the deceased. The throne of Tidore is not strictly hereditary, as a candidate is appointed from the various branches of the royal dynasty. Husain Syah was enthroned on 22 October 2014 (28 Dhu al-Hijjah 1436 AH).

Apart from his ceremonial duties, the Sultan is also a member of the Indonesian Regional Representative Council (DPD) representing North Maluku (since 2019). He has strongly promoted the appointment of Sultan Zainal Abidin Alting (r. 1947–1967) as a Pahlawan Nasional Indonesia (Indonesian national hero).

== See also ==
- List of rulers of Maluku
- Sultanate of Tidore

Husain Syah of Tidore
Preceded by Djafar Syah	Sultan of Tidore; 2014-present	Succeeded by Incumbent
