= Sultanate of Bacan =

State in Southeast Asia (c.1322-1965)

Sultanate of Bacan كسلطانن باچن Kesultanan Bacan
- 1322?–1965
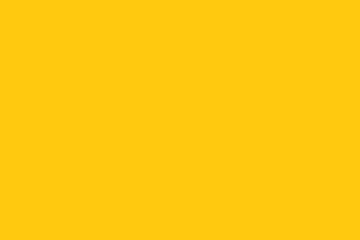
- Prior to 1609 After becoming Dutch protectorate in 1609 Flag

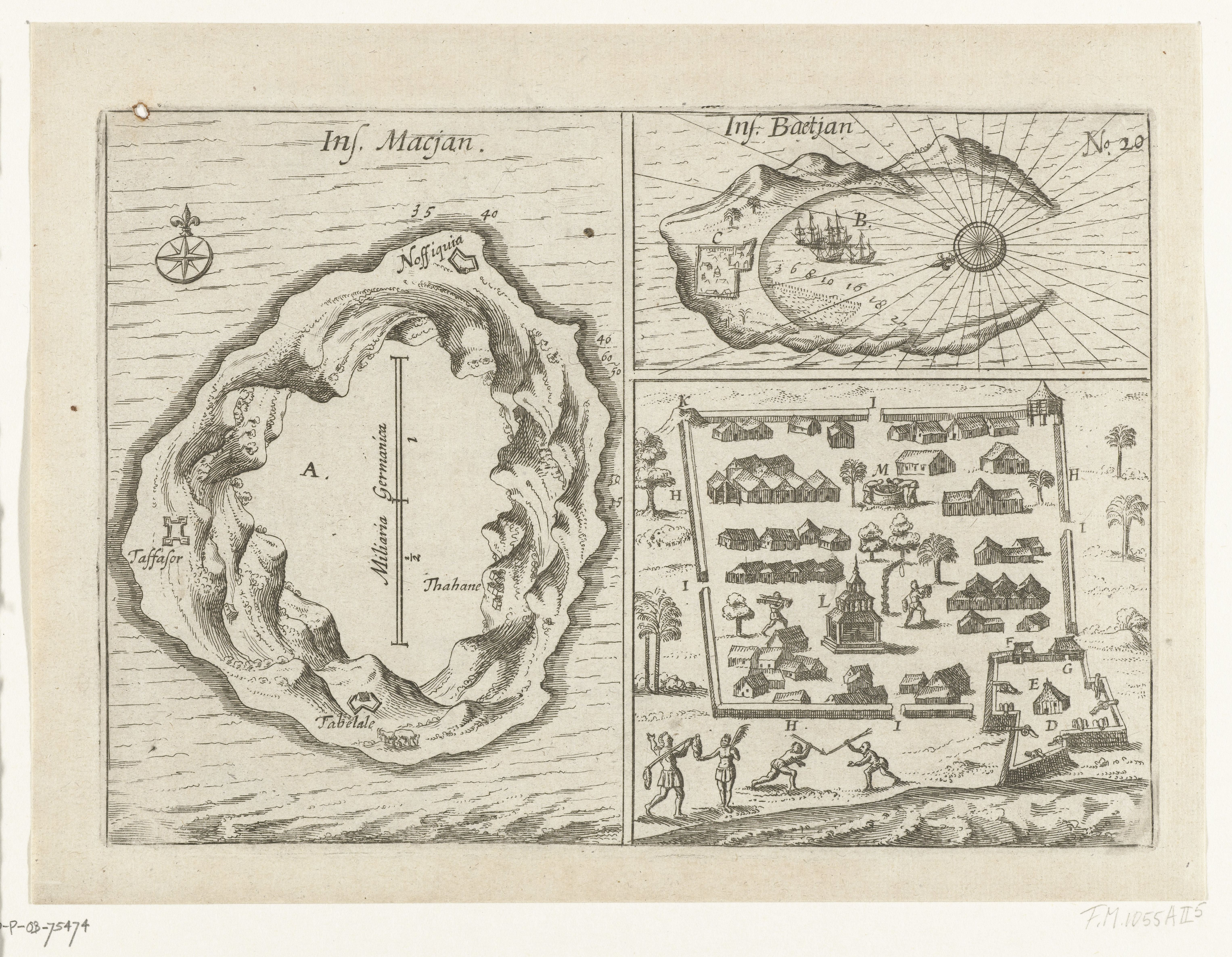
- Bacan Island (right), including its settlement. c. 1616
- Capital: Amassing
- Common languages: Bacanese Malay
- Religion: Sunni Islam (after late 1400s)
- Government: Sultanate
- Sultan, Dehe ma-kolano
  - c. 1515: Raja Yusuf
  - 1557 – 1577: Dom João Hairun
  - 1935 – 1983: Muhammad Muhsin
- History
  - Founded: 1322?
  - Conversion to Islam: 1200s
  - Vassalisation by Dutch: 1609
  - Functions of sultan replaced by Indonesia: 1965
Succeeded by
Dutch East Indies
- Today part of: Indonesia

The Sultanate of Bacan (كسلطانن باچن; Indonesian: Kesultanan Bacan; Indonesian pronunciation: [kəsʊlˌt̪anan ˈbat͡ʃan]) was a state in Maluku Islands, present-day Indonesia that arose with the expansion of the spice trade in late medieval times. It mainly consisted of the Bacan Islands (Makian, Kayoa, Gane (Southern Halmahera), Bacan, Kasiruta, Mandioli, Obi etc.) but had periodical influence in Ceram and the Raja Ampat Islands. It fell under the colonial influence of Portugal in the 16th century and the Dutch East India Company (VOC) after 1609. Bacan was one of the four kingdoms of Maluku (Maloko Kië Raha) together with Ternate, Tidore and Jailolo, but tended to be overshadowed by Ternate. After the independence of Indonesia in 1949, the governing functions of the sultan were gradually replaced by a modern administrative structure. However, the sultanate has been revived as a cultural entity in present times.

== Early history ==
According to a legend known from the 16th century, the kings of Bacan, the Raja Ampat Islands off Papua, Banggai and Buton descended from a set of snake's eggs which had been found among some rocks by the Bacan seafarer Bikusigara. On account of this, Bacan could claim to be the origin-point of the Maluku political order. The myth also points at early relations with the Papuans. However, there are conflicting legends according to which Jailolo in Halmahera was the oldest kingdom of Maluku. A third legend departs from the Arab immigrant Jafar Sadik who came to Maluku, ostensibly in 1245, and married the heavenly nymph Nurus Safa. From this pair, four sons called Buka, Darajat, Sahajat and Mashur-ma-lamo were born, who became ancestors of the rulers of Bacan, Jailolo, Tidore, and Ternate. In this story, too, Bacan has a precedence position. The ruler was nevertheless known as Kolano ma-dehe, Ruler of the Far End (i.e. in relation to Ternate and Tidore).

According to the Dutch writer François Valentijn (1724), the Bacan kingdom was established in 1322. He mentions an early king of Bacan with a Muslim name, Sidang Hasan in about 1345 who suffered an invasion from Ternate. Later on, in 1465 a prince called Bakar expanded Bacan's influence on the north coast of Ceram and even in Hitu in Ambon. However, Valentijn claims that the first Muslim ruler was actually Sultan Zainal Abidin who allegedly flourished in 1512. In one version, his brother Jelman was acknowledged as Raja of Misool, one of the Raja Ampat Islands. From early European accounts it appears that the kings in the Maluku archipelago began to accept Islam in about the 1460s or 1470s as the result of the increasing trade in cloves, that attracted merchants from the Muslim world.

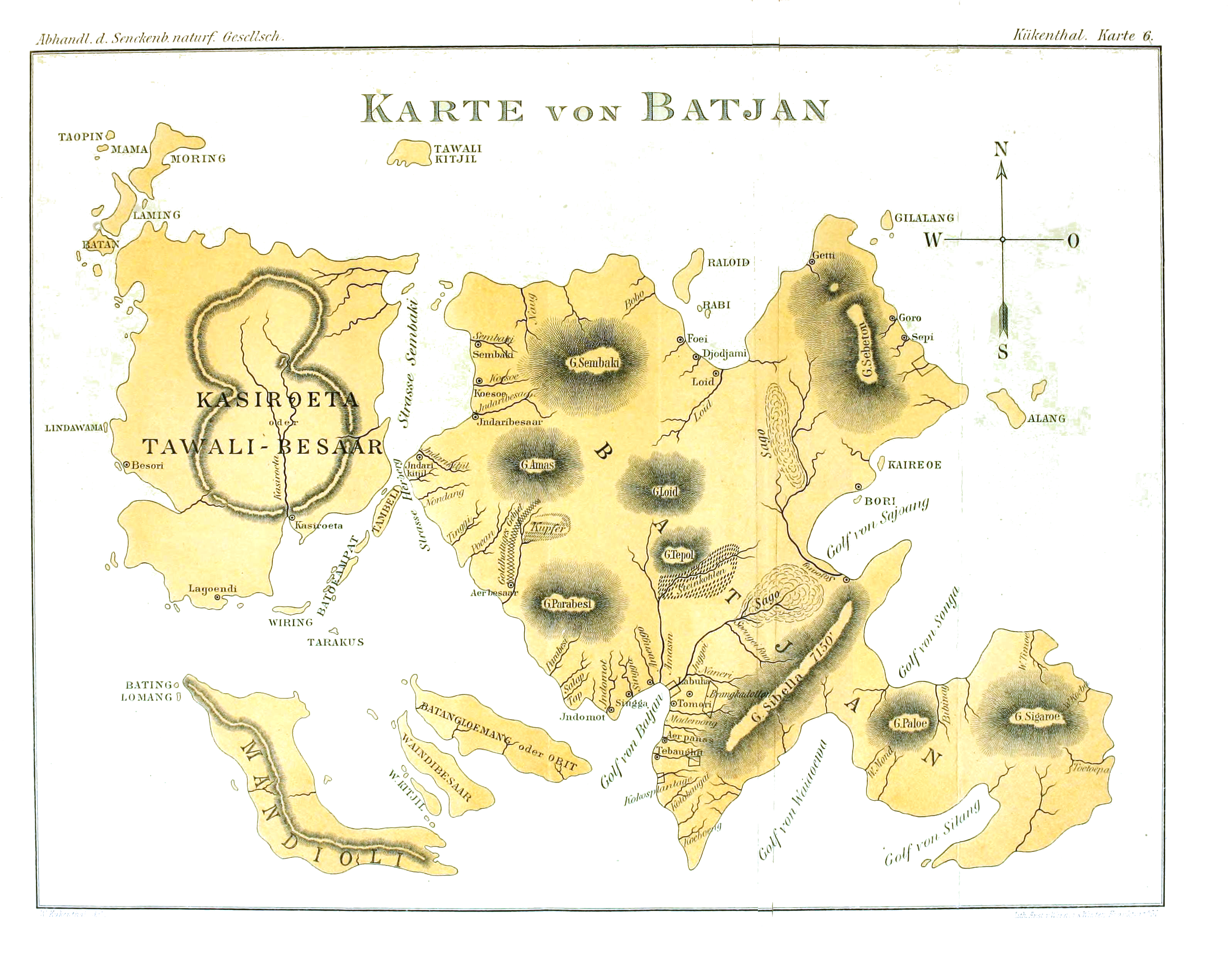
The Bacan Islands, map from the 19th century.

The indigenous chronicles of Bacan are difficult to evaluate as their stories of persons and events do not fit with contemporary sources up to the late 16th century. They say that the Bacan Islands were originally governed by a plethora of chiefs or ambasaya. By the time, Said Muhammad Bakir alias Husin, who was one of the sons of the Arab newcomer Sidna Noh Jafar, took up residence in Makian north of Bacan, an important center for clove production. He subsequently became acknowledged as lord in Kasiruta in the Bacan Archipelago. Muhammad Bakir sired seven children of whom Zainal Abidin succeeded his father in Makian and Kasiruta. His six brothers and sisters ended up as rulers or consorts in Misool, Waigeo, Banggai, Loloda, Ceram and Bacan Island, which thereby became tied to the dynastic network of the sultanate. Zainal Abidin married a Ternate princess who gave birth to Bayan Sirrullah who was made sub-ruler in Makian; he later left it and instead inherited his father’s throne in Kasiruta. After this, Makian was apparently lost to the Bacan kings. After a prosperous and peaceful reign Bayan Sirrullah died and was succeeded by Alauddin, known to have reigned in 1581-c. 1609. Contemporary European sources mention other names before 1581 (see below).

== Early European impact ==
When the Portuguese appeared in Maluku from 1512, Bacan was a significant local realm with more men and ships than Ternate, Tidore or Jailolo. Linguistic research has shown that Bacan Malay is closer to Melaka Straits Malay than other Malay dialects in Maluku, pointing at early strong relations with traders from the Malay world. The royal seat was not on Bacan Island as it was in later times but rather on Kasiruta. The power of the sultan extended to Ceram which was economically vital due to trade in forest products, largely coming from the Papuan lands. Clove production was small compared to the other Malukan islands, though it grew rapidly up to the mid 16th century. Tomé Pires (c. 1515) says that the name of the ruler was Raja Yusuf, who was the half-brother of Bayan Sirrullah of Ternate. In 1521 the remnants of the Magellan expedition arrived to Tidore where the Spanish seafarers were approached by the sultans of Tidore, Jalolo and Bacan as potential allies against the Portuguese intruders. The ruler of Bacan at the time was married to a daughter of the pro-Portuguese Bayan Sirrullah, but had a fallout with his father-in-law who was promptly poisoned by the couple. The Bacanese moreover massacred a party of Portuguese who carelessly abused the wives of the locals and even the court ladies.

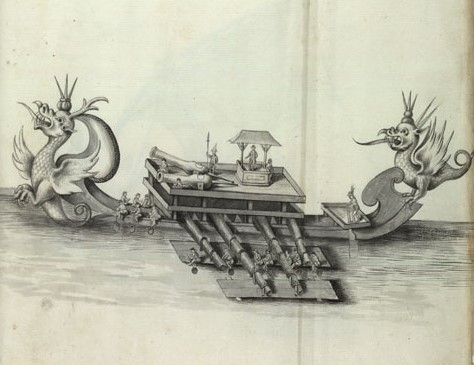
A Malukan kora kora (large outrigger geared for warfare) in a manuscript from 1561

During the next decades Bacan played a subordinate role in relation to Ternate and Tidore. A sultan called Alauddin (I) appears in the 1520s and lived in a shifting state of alliance and hostility with the Portuguese. When he tried to keep aloof of the Europeans, a Portuguese expedition raided the capital in 1534 and even destroyed the royal graves. By the mid 16th century the sultanate produced as much cloves as Ternate. It was an important port of call for ships going from Ternate to other parts of the archipelago, and from Banda or Ambon to Ternate. Papuan chiefs sometimes visited Bacan with their vessels and had friendly ties with the sultan. Alauddin's son and successor was Hairun (1557-1577), not to be confused with his maternal uncle Hairun of Ternate. Islam was still confined to a thin layer of society while most inhabitants followed local religious practices. Hairun was on bad terms with his similarly-named uncle of Ternate. He therefore sought support with the Portuguese and converted to Catholicism, adopting the name Dom João. The conversion of the ruler and part of the inhabitants led to trouble after 1570. The new Ternatan ruler Babullah, a cousin and brother-in-law of Dom João, held a strongly Muslim and anti-Portuguese position and attacked Christianized areas of Maluku, including Bacan. While the Portuguese were expelled from Ternate in 1575, Dom João was forced to revert to Islam; nevertheless, Babullah sent emissaries who poisoned his cousin in 1577. Bacan was badly ravaged in the process and its history in the next decades is rather obscure. A son or brother of Dom João, Dom Henrique, was allowed by Ternate to fill the throne but soon started to collude with the Portuguese and was killed in battle in 1581. Christianity was largely suppressed, though a congregation remained in Labuha on Bacan Island under troubled conditions.

Of Bacanese royalty there remained a young son of Dom João called Alauddin II (1581-c. 1609) who, although a Muslim, strove to cast off the Ternatan yoke. The death of the powerful Babullah (1583) and the Spanish-Portuguese union (1581) made for opportunities, as the Spanish tried to master Maluku from their bases in the Philippines. Alauddin II assisted an Iberian invasion in 1603 where he was personally wounded, and again in 1606. On the last occasion the Spanish were entirely successful in defeating the Ternate Sultanate and rewarded Alauddin II with the islands of Kayoa, Waidoba and Bayloro. However, the long series of conflicts had taken a heavy toll: the population of the sultanate had declined and the sultan only played a marginal role in the affairs in Maluku. The old residence in Kasiruta had been abandoned by the early 17th century and the palace was moved to Amassing on the south-west side of Bacan Island, close to Labuha. According to the Bacan Chronicle, Alauddin gave his daughter in marriage to Patra Samargalila, the Sangaji (chief) of Labuha. The Sangaji and his wife then persuaded Alauddin to move his seat to the vicinity of Labuha since it was a good land with a fine river. Dutch sources indicate that fear of the lethal raids carried out by Tidorese war fleets was decisive in the move.

== Dutch overlordship ==
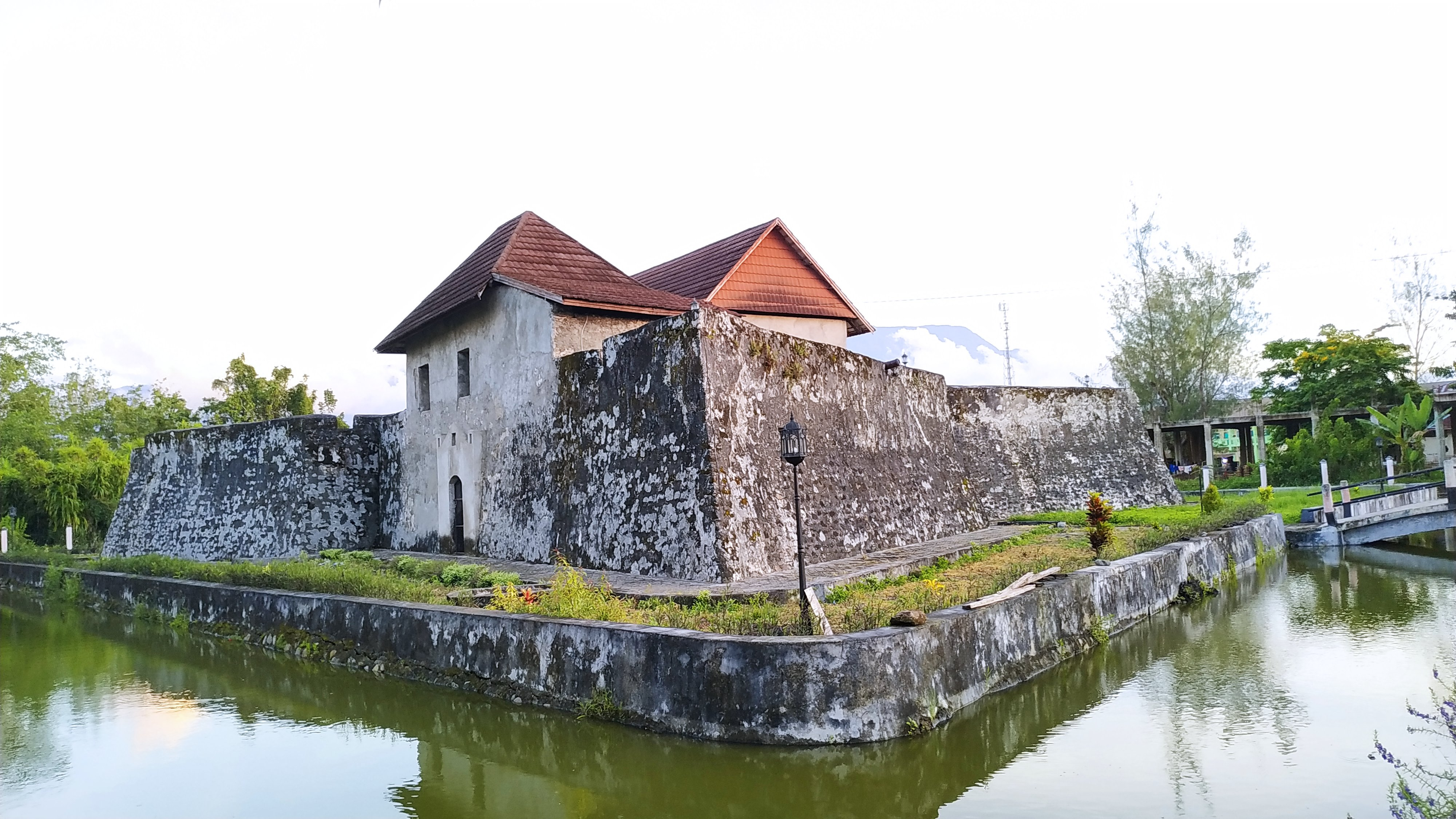
Barneveld Fort in Bacan

The Dutch seafarers began to approach Maluku in 1599 and fought a drawn-out struggle with the Spanish Empire while allying with Ternate. In 1609 the commander Simon Jansz Hoen and Sultan Mudafar Syah I of Ternate invaded Bacan and approached the Spanish fort at Labuha. Sultan Alauddin II chose to stay aloof from the fighting. The Spanish and the Christian inhabitants left Labuha and were later killed or captured. As representative of the Dutch East India Company (VOC) Hoen made a contract with Alauddin who promised to follow the VOC monopoly of the spice trade, and to give back a few islands to Ternate. The Spanish fort was renamed Fort Barneveld (after the statesman Johan van Oldenbarnevelt) and manned with 50 men. At this time Bacan claimed to be the overlord of the Papuan islands of Waigeo, Misool and Waigama. However, it is possible that the relation was a bond of commerce rather than political obedience. The pretensions to certain islands and villages in the Papuan lands were still upheld by the court at the time of François Valentijn (1724) but were obscure by that time. More persistent were the ambitions of Bacan to maintain suzerainty over part of Ceram's north coast. However, by the second half of the 17th century the Ceramese villages plainly refused to obey the commands of the sultan. The sultanate shrank further in 1682 when Sultan Alauddin III sold the Obi Islands to the VOC for 800 Reals, an act remembered in Bacan with great resentment.

The Bacan rulers after 1609 were involved in the struggle for Maluku, usually but not always on the side of the VOC. Alauddin II died soon after the 1609 contract and a regent, Kaicili Malito held power for a while. He was killed in a sea battle against the Spanish-affiliated Tidore in 1614. Alauddin’s son Sultan Nurusalat (c. 1609-1649) was involved in a murky affair in 1627 when elements of the Christian population in Labuha conspired with the Spanish against the Dutch presence with the tacit knowledge of the sultan, who vainly tried to use the opportunity to bring the Labuha people under his direct rule. After his death, his son Muhammad Ali (1649-1655) had to sign a contract in 1653 where he agreed to extirpate the cloves in his kingdom to ensure VOC monopoly. Bacan was then involved in the Great Ambon War where rebels from north and central Maluku allied with the Makassarese to make an end of the Dutch tyranny. Bacan was briefly forced to side with the rebels, and the ruler was held by the rebels against his own will. He was mortally wounded in a fight at Manipa in 1655, and soon expired at the coast of Buru. His successor Alauddin III quickly made a contract with the VOC in January 1656, complemented by a more detailed contact in April 1667 that put Bacan under the thumb of the Dutch.

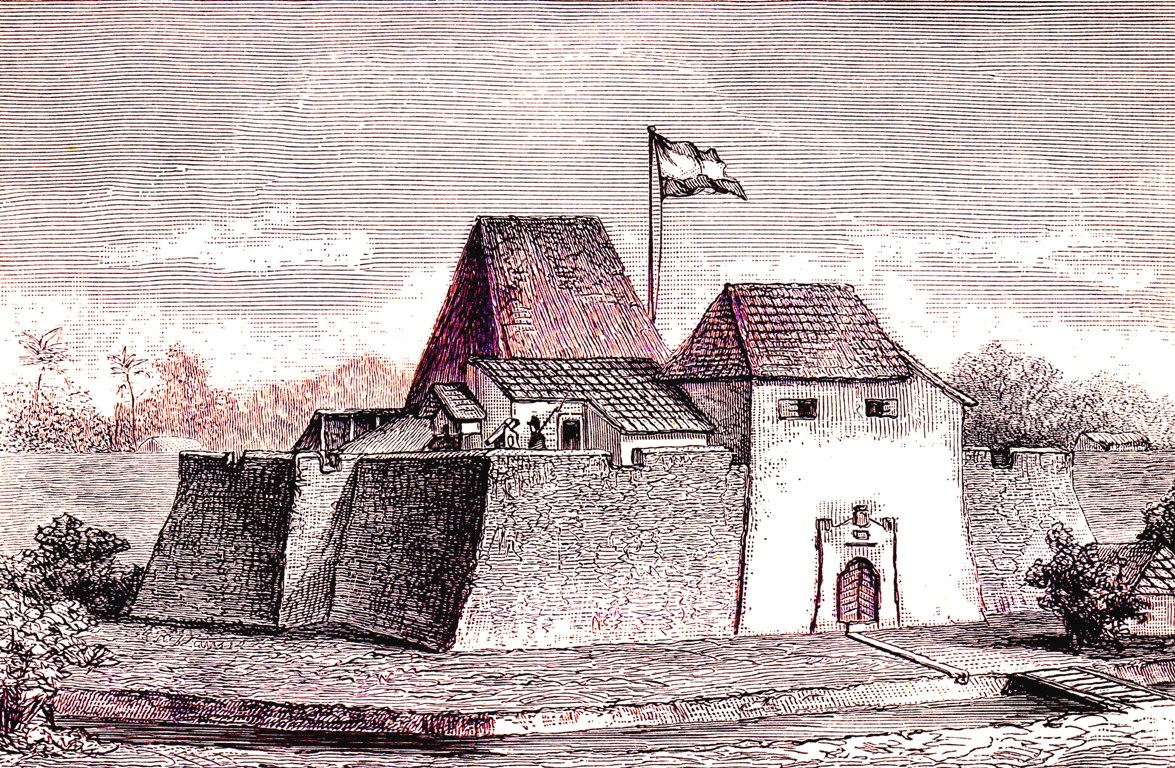
Fort Barneveld on Bacan Island.

After the rebellions in the region had been defeated in the late 1650s, the Dutch kept Bacan under close surveillance for more than a century. Dutch observers found the Bacan elite to be stout and self-assured in spite of the shrunken state of the sultanate, as they tried to uphold obsolete claims to parts of Ceram and Papua. The low population density, aggravated by epidemics, and the abundance of sago and fish made the population self-sufficient in terms of foodstuff, and the Dutch complained about the perceived inertia of the locals. Piracy was a big problem for the vulnerable population far into the 19th century. In 1774 the ruler Muhammad Sahadin (1741-1779) entertained friendly contacts with the British sea captain Thomas Forrest and also with the independent Sultan of Maguindanao. The suspicious Dutch therefore deposed him in 1779. The next two sultans were likewise exiled. However, by now a rebel movement gained momentum in Maluku and Papua in the form of the Tidorese prince Nuku who persistently fought the Dutch with varying success. With British assistance, Nuku’s forces conquered the Dutch fort in Bacan in 1797, before occupying Tidore itself. Prince Atiatun, who administered the kingdom at the time, in fact welcomed Nuku. The war nevertheless led to widespread destruction on the Bacan Islands with depopulation in many places.

== The late colonial era ==
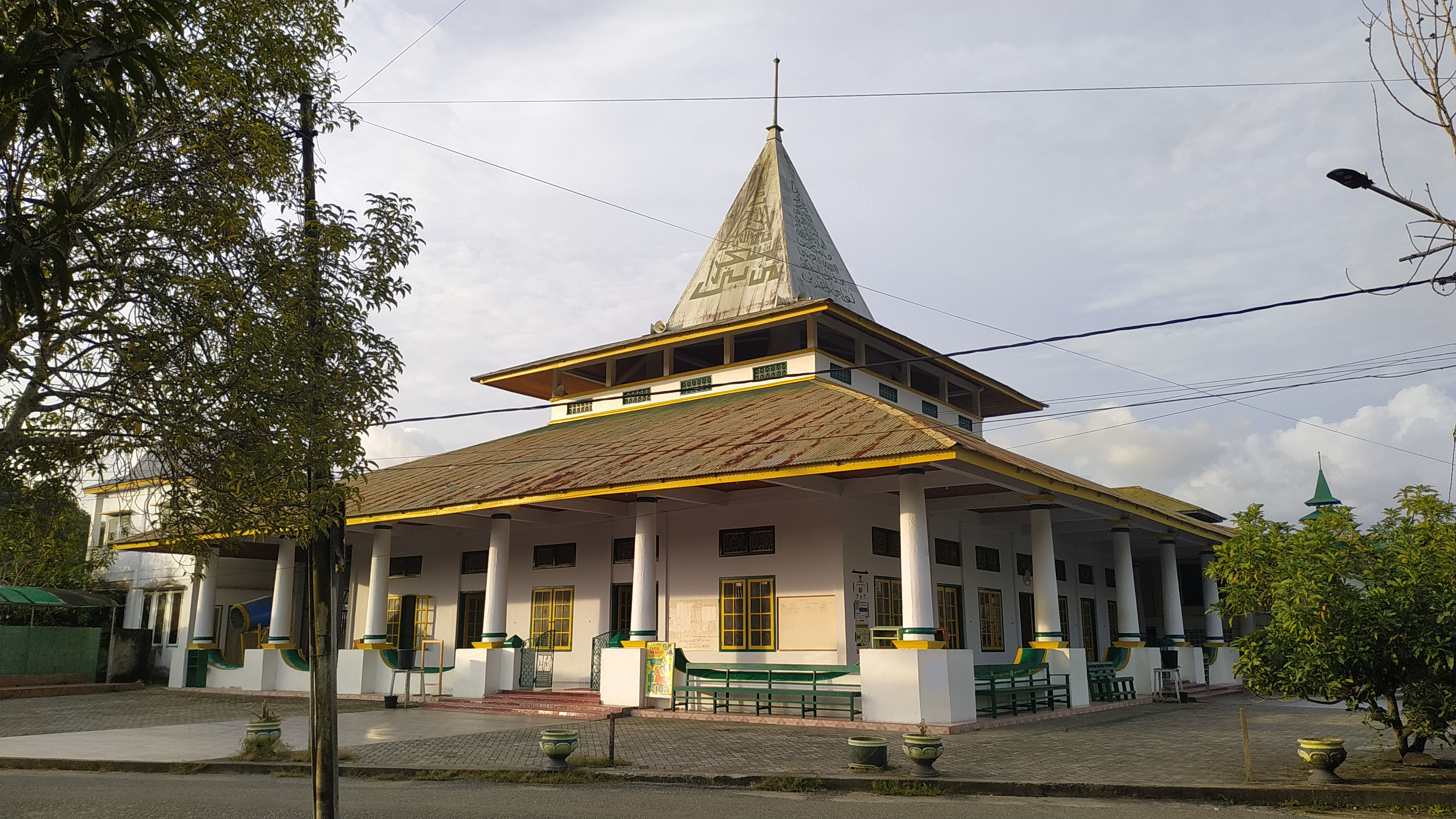
Sultan Bacan Mosque

The British appointed a new sultan from a side-branch, Kamarullah (1797-1826), who was allowed to remain after the return of the Dutch to Maluku and became the ancestor of the later rulers. His son Muhammad Hayatuddin Kornabei (1826-1860) received the British naturalist Alfred Russel Wallace who commented on the utterly sparse population, and the desire of the sultan to attract enterprising foreigners to the mineral-rich islands. A group of Chinese gold workers were in fact brought from West Borneo in the mid-19th century but were less than successful. Another attempt to develop the islands with the sultan’s support was made by the merchant M.E.F. Elout van Soeterwoude who began to plant vanilla, coffee, tobacco and potatoes. The unsuitability of the soil and climate foiled his ambitions and he withdrew his efforts in 1900. In one respect Bacan stood out locally since its Christian community attained a high level of Western education. At the demise of Sultan Muhammad Sadik (1862-1889) a commission of grandees governed for many years for want of suitable heirs. Eventually his son Muhammad Usman (not to be confused with his contemporary Muhammad Usman of Ternate) signed a contract in 1899 that gave the Dutch colonial government the right of taxation. He was formally elevated as sultan in February 1900 and signed the so-called Short Declaration in 1910, instead of the longer contracts signed by previous rulers. This marked the full colonial subordination of indigenous rule.

Muhammad Usman’s son Muhammad Muhsin (1935-1983) survived the Japanese occupation and the ensuing Indonesian Revolution. During the war years Bacan suffered from hardship and Allied bombings that also destroyed the sultan's palace. There was little republican agitation in North Maluku after 1945 and some aspect of the old "feudal" governance survived the Indonesian Independence in 1949. Muhammad Muhsin served as Resident of North Maluku in 1956-1959. However, the Malukan sultanates were increasingly incorporated in the new bureaucracy, and the last rights of the sultan to be represented in the formal administration were abolished in 1965. Towards the end of the 20th century the old sultanates of Maluku experienced a cultural revival, especially after the fall of the Suharto regime in 1998. Bacan was part of this “sultanism” with the enthronement of a son of the last ruler as titular sultan, although with a lower profile than Ternate.

== Administration of the sultanate ==
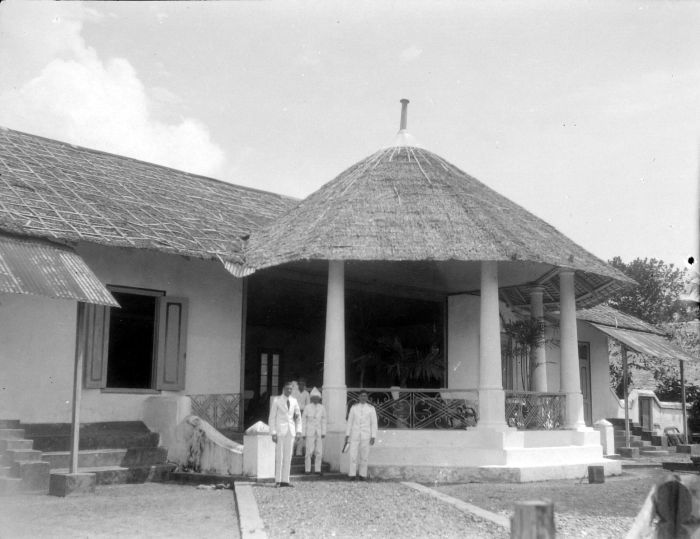
The residence of the sultan in 1935.

The sultan governed with the help of two groups of officials. The Bobato dalem (inner grandees) assisted at the royal court and consisted of members with the military titles mayor, kapitan and lieutenant (ngofa or kie). Under them were various alfiris, sergeants and caretakers. The Bobato luar (outer grandees) were those who actually assisted the sultan in governing the realm. They were the jogugu (first minister), hukum (magistrate) and kimelaha sapanggala (errand) who held authority over the various local chiefs, such as ambasaya and datu. Apart from them there was a group of religious officials, Bobato akhirat. The highest official of the kingdom was however the Kapitan Laut (sea lord) who was a relative of the sultan and usually the heir to the throne. The sultan was only the headman over the ethnic Bacanese who were traditionally divided into genealogical units called soanang and paid contributions (ngasé) to the ruler. Foreigners stood under their own princes of Ternate, Tidore, etc. Labuha with its Christian population was directly ruled by the colonial government and was headed by a chief called Sangaji. Dutch rule was represented by a controleur after 1883, and the kingdom became increasingly governed by colonial officials that the old ruling elite had to listen to.

== List of sultans ==
=== Legendary rulers ===
Kolano or Sultan of Bacan	Reign
Buka	13th century?
Sidang Hasan	14th century?
Muhammad Bakir	c. 1465
Zainal Abidin	c. 1512
Bayan Sirrullah	16th century

=== Historical rulers ===
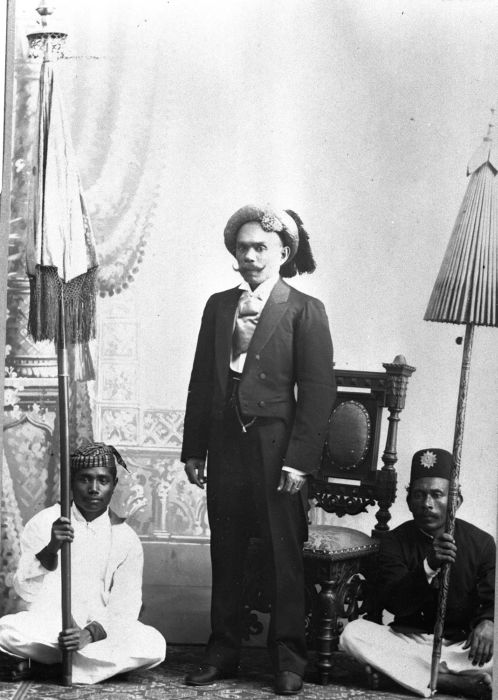
Sultan Muhammad Usman (r. 1899-1935)

Sultan of Bacan	Reign
Raja Yusuf	c. 1515
Alauddin I	c. 1520–1557
Dom João, Hairun	1557–1577
Dom Henrique	1577–1581
Alauddin II	1581-c. 1609
Kaicili Malito (regent)	c. 1609–1614
Nurusalat	c. 1609–1649
Muhammad Ali	1649–1655
Alauddin III	1655-1701
Musa Malikuddin	1701–1715
Kie Nasiruddin	1715-1732
Hamza Tarafan Nur	1732–1741
Muhammad Sahadin	1741–1779
Skandar Alam	1780–1788
Muhammad Badaruddin, Ahmad	1788–1797
Kamarullah	1797–1826
Muhammad Hayatuddin Kornabei	1826–1860
Muhammad Sadik	1862–1889
Muhammad Usman	1899–1935
Muhammad Muhsin	1935–1983

=== Modern titular rulers ===
Sultan of Bacan	Reign
Al-Hajj Dede Muhammad Gahral Adyan Syah	1983–2009
Al-Hajj Dede Abdurrahim Muhammad Gary Ridwan Syah	2010–2023
Dede Muhammad Irsyad Maulana Syah	2024–Now

== See also ==
- List of rulers of Maluku
- Sultanate of Jailolo
- Sultanate of Ternate
- Sultanate of Tidore
- Spice trade
