= Zainal Abidin of Tidore =

Zainal Abidin

Sultan of Tidore
- Reign: 1805-1810
- Predecessor: Nuku
- Successor: Muhammad Tahir
- Died: 1810
- Father: Sultan Jamaluddin
- Religion: Islam

Sultan Zainal Abidin (Jawi: سلطان زين العابدين; died 1810) was the twentieth Sultan of Tidore in Maluku Islands. He inherited the anti-Dutch movement that had been built up by his brother Nuku, succeeding him as ruler in 1805. However, he was not capable of resisting renewed attacks by the Dutch colonial power and was forced to flee from Tidore Island in 1806. In the following years he tried using allied populations in Halmahera and Papua to fight the Dutch, with limited success, until his demise in 1810. He was the last independent Sultan of Tidore, since his successors were firmly under British or Dutch control.

== Becoming Sultan ==
Prince Muhammad Zainal Abidin was a son of Sultan Jamaluddin of Tidore, and the brother of Nuku, Garomahongi, Muhammad Tahir (Mossel), Topa Mabunga and Hassan. When his father was deposed and exiled to Batavia in 1779, Zainal Abidin and Garomahongi were brought along and later sent over to Ceylon. Zainal Abidin was allowed to return to Maluku in 1794, where the charismatic Nuku had waged an uprising against the Dutch East India Company since 1780. The prince soon joined his brother's movement, serving as fleet commander and diplomatic envoy. As such he negotiated with the British who had taken over Ambon and the Banda Islands in 1796, and helped fomenting an alliance between Britain and Nuku's rebel forces. With the British in his back, Nuku occupied Tidore island in 1797 and became the de facto Sultan. However, he soon found Zainal Abidin to act in a disloyal way and persuaded the British authorities to exile his brother to Madras in 1799. The prince returned again to Tidore in 1802 and reconciled with Nuku. By now, Nuku was old and ailing and the departure of the British from Maluku in 1803 left him in a vulnerable position vis-à-vis the returning Dutch. When he died in November 1805, he was succeeded as Sultan by Zainal Abidin although there were other pretenders.

== Flight from Tidore ==
The new Sultan had a hostile relation to the Dutch Governor C.L. Wieling, who resided in Ternate and whose endorsement of his enthronement he declined to seek. Forts on Tidore fired on ships that came nearby, and Tidorese korakoras (large outriggers) flied the Dutch tricolor upside down as an act of defiance. The Sultan also received a British naval squadron, to the consternation of the Dutch who feared a joint attack. After the British left, a state of open war soon broke out. Zainal Abidin refused to extradite Sultan Muhammad Arif Bila of Jailolo on Halmahera, whom the Dutch considered to be a rebel, and an amphibious operation was prepared by Wieling. This was carried out on 13 November 1806 and was entirely successful; the Tidorese forts were conquered, and Zainal Abidin and Sultan Jailolo hastily fled to Weda on Halmahera. The Sultan prepared to wage war against the Dutch with the help of Nuku's old allies in Gamrange (southeastern Halmahera) and the Papuan Islands, but most of them flatly refused to assist him. It was obvious that Zainal Abidin lacked the prestige and charisma of his brother Nuku. Moreover, he lost his ally Sultan Jailolo who died in an accident. Gamrange was occupied by Wieling's force in February 1807, and Zainal Abidin had to find refuge on Misool, one of the Papuan Islands. He found some sympathies among his old allies, the English East India Company, that equipped his small fleet of korakoras, but this was insufficient to turn the tide.

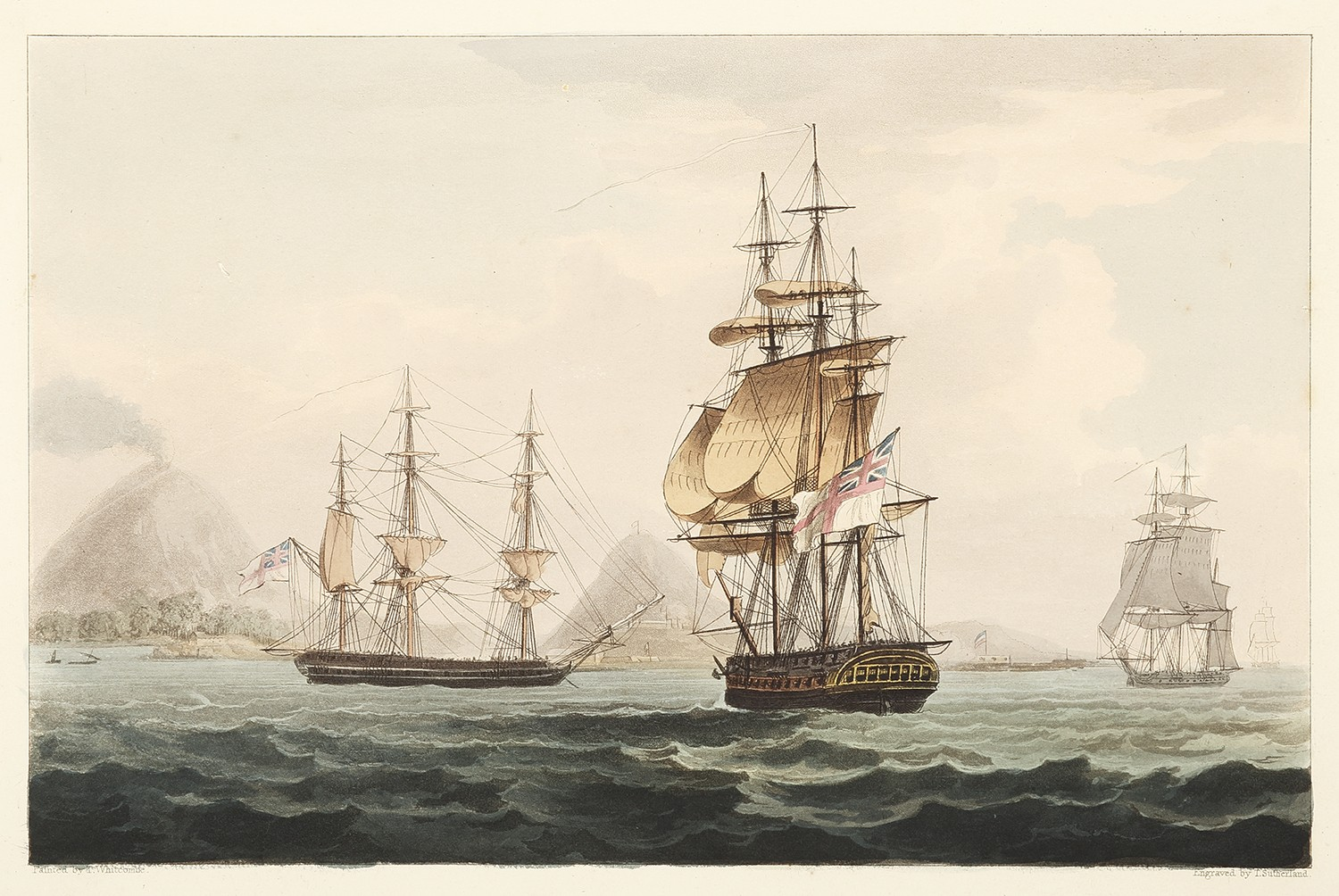
British naval squadron operating in Maluku 1810.

== Death and legacy ==
At Maba in Halmahera, Zainal Abidin repulsed a fleet from Ternate dispatched by the Dutch. This was his last feat since he died soon after, news of his demise being received by the Europeans in July 1810. The Maba people, still loyal to his cause, named his son Jamaluddin as the new Sultan Tidore. However, even before his demise a new Sultan had been proclaimed on Tidore Island. This was his brother Muhammad Tahir who was acknowledged by the returning British, who had occupied Ambon in February 1810. He did not cause any trouble for the British or Dutch.

Compared to Nuku, Zainal Abidin was a weak leader who failed to retain the loyalties of the various populations of Maluku and Papua. He did not act as an exemplary ruler on the lines of his brother, but rather showed signs of moral weakness, for example by helping himself to the wife of one of his lieutenants. Nor did he act proactively to secure British support when they returned to Maluku in 1810. He nevertheless showed a certain consistency in his tenacious struggle against the superior Dutch power, refusing to yield even when his case was apparently forlorn. The next five Tidorese Sultans up to 1905 were firmly subordinated to colonial governance. By contrast, his close allies, the Sultans of Jailolo continued to create problems for the Dutch up to 1832, and again briefly in 1875–1877.

== Family ==
Sultan Zainal Abidin had two sons:

- Jamaluddin, rebel leader in Halmahera 1817, captured and exiled in 1818
- Kapita, exiled with his brother in 1818

== See also ==
- List of rulers of Maluku
- Tidore Sultanate
- Sultanate of Ternate
- Nuku Rebellion
- French and British interregnum in the Dutch East Indies

Zainal Abidin of Tidore
Preceded by Nuku	Sultan of Tidore; 1805-1810	Succeeded by Muhammad Tahir
