= Nuku rebellion =

18th Century Revolts In Moluccas

- Part of the Dutch colonial campaigns
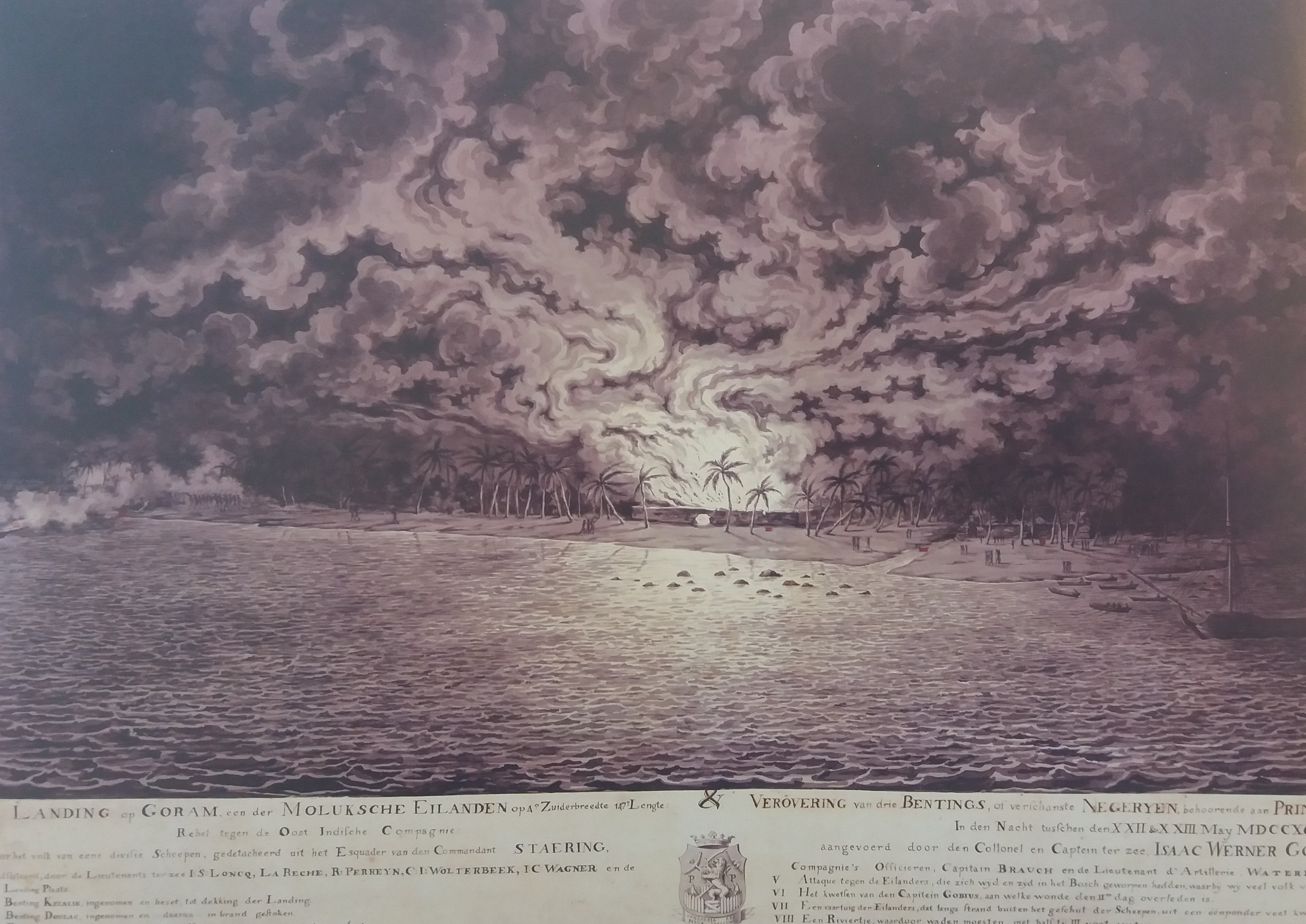
- Nuku's rebel allies on Gorom Island are attacked by VOC forces under Colonel Gobius in May 1791, their village being set on fire.
Date	1780–1810
Location	Maluku Islands and Western New Guinea
Result	1st Phase (1780–1801): Tidore victory; 2nd Phase (1801–1810): Dutch victory

Belligerents
Dutch East India Company (until 1799): Dutch East Indies; Sultanate of Ternate; Sultanate of Bacan	Sultanate of Tidore; Tidore rebels; Ceram rebels; Papuan rebels; Bacan rebels; Sultanate of Maguindanao; East India Company

Commanders and leaders
Governor J. G. Budach; Governor W. J. Cranssen; Governor Van Pleuren; Kamaluddin of Tidore	Nuku of Tidore #; Zainal Abidin of Tidore #; Muhammad Arif Bila of Jailolo; Kapiten Baukan

The Nuku rebellion was an anti-colonial movement that engulfed large parts of Maluku Islands and Western New Guinea between 1780 and 1810. It was initiated by the prince and later sultan of Tidore, Nuku Muhammad Amiruddin (c. 1738 – 1805), also known as Prince Nuku or Sultan Nuku. The movement united several ethnic groups of eastern Indonesia in the struggle against the Dutch and was temporarily successful, helped by an alliance with the British East India Company. However, the movement was defeated after the demise of Nuku, and Maluku was restored under European rule. In 1995, Nuku was officially appointed a National Hero of Indonesia.

== Background ==
Nuku or Amiruddin was born around 1738 into one of the four branches of the royal family of Tidore. His father became Sultan of Tidore in 1757 under the name Jamaluddin. At this time the Dutch East India Company (VOC) had dominated the Sultanate of Tidore for a century though it was still formally autonomous. Apart from Tidore Island it encompassed parts of Halmahera, Seram, and New Guinea, which yielded foodstuff, forest and sea products that gave the sultanate a certain economic significance. However, its prestige was declining since the VOC increasingly imposed its will on Tidore and its neighbour, the Sultanate of Ternate. This was aggravated by a rebellion in the Papuan island, Salawati, and incursions by the Iranun people of southern Philippines. In 1768, the Dutch forced Sultan Jamaluddin to cede his rights to Seram, which enraged Nuku. His hatred of the VOC arose further in 1779 when his father and two brothers were arrested and exiled by the Dutch, on suspicions of misrule and conspiring with the British East India Company (EIC) and the rulers of Bacan and Maguindanao. This was followed by a new treaty in 1780 where Tidore was reduced from a Dutch ally to a vassal state. Nuku's junior kinsman, Kamaluddin, later became sultan and a rival of Nuku.

== Fighting against the Dutch ==
After the exile of Amiruddin's father, the Dutch appointed Kaicil Gay Jira as regent of the sultanate. Jira was later replaced by his son, Patra Alam; Amiruddin opposed this replacement. While Patra Alam ruled as Dutch-appointed sultan from 1780 to 1783, Amiruddin built a kora-kora armada around Seram Island and Papua.

In 1781, Amiruddin declared that he bore the title "Sri Maha Tuan Sultan Amir Muhammad Saifuddin Syah" ("The Great Overlord Sultan Amir Muhammad Saifuddin, the Shah"). Responding to this, the Dutch attacked and defeated Amiruddin's army, but they failed to catch Amiruddin himself. In 1783, the Dutch attacked Amiruddin's army again. The Dutch commander and most of his men were killed, and the survivors were captured.

In October 1783, the Dutch post on Tidore was attacked by Amiruddin's force, and all the Europeans were killed. This intensified the rivalry between the kingdom of Ternate and Tidore. In November of that year, Ternate helped the Dutch attack Tidore. In December, the Dutch enforced an agreement and appointed Sultan Hairul Alam Kamaluddin Kaicili Asgar, a prince exiled to Ceylon, as the new puppet sultan.

In 1787, Amiruddin's base in eastern Seram was attacked and seized by the Dutch forces; however, Amiruddin managed to escape. Amiruddin then built a new base on the island of Gorong. He also initiated a positive relationship with Britain. After receiving armaments from Britain, Amiruddin's army attacked the Dutch, winning this battle. The Dutch then offered Amiruddin a position if he would negotiate with Sultan Kamaluddin; Amiruddin refused this proposition. Instead, he increased the frequency of his attacks against the Dutch, who were assisted by Kamaluddin's forces. In 1794, Kamaluddin's son Zainal Abidin, who had returned from exile, supported Amiruddin's effort. Several rulers of Papua also sided with him. In February 1795, Amiruddin's son Abdulgafur led a force to Tidore.

== Course of hostile relations ==
=== Early conflict (1780–1781) ===
Records show that Prince Nuku did not need long to gather troops in the outskirts of Tidore. Since the attack on Toloa, relations between Tidore and the three governments (especially Ternate) revolved around Prince Nuku's rebellion. Prince Nuku repeatedly attacked Dutch subjects, and in response the Dutch invaded areas whose residents were considered supporters of Prince Nuku. The newly appointed Sultan of Patra Alam became powerless, almost completely overshadowed by the power of the Nuku prince over the outskirts of Tidore.

=== Attack on Toloa (1780) ===
On 14 July 1780, Toloa was finally attacked by the rebels. In his efforts to expel the rebels, the Governor of Ternate used the help of four kora-kora who brought along one hundred Europeans and the native Alifuru militia. About 30 Tidoreans were killed and the survivors fled inland. Only one Alifuru or European was injured. Even though the Dutch won this battle, they finally had a crisis of confidence in Sultan Jamaludin, and appointed Patra Alam as sultan.

=== Campaign of Halmahera and Sulawesi (1780) ===
In 1780, rebel troops attacked and looted Ambelau, Haya, and Haitiling, as well as Sula and Besi as far as Bacan. They also attacked Selayar, Buton, and Talaud at the northern tip of Sulawesi. During these attacks, more than 300 people were arrested.

=== Sack of Nusatelu (1780) ===
In the following months of 1780, Prince Nuku's troops attacked and plundered the Nusatelu Islands (Drie Gebroeders), Ambelau, Haya, and Luhu, capturing and enslaving 134 residents. Two European soldiers and eight native soldiers were injured in clashes near Kramat, Buru. Many residents in Haitiling (Hatileng) were massacred or fled.

=== Battle of Amahai (1781) ===
In December 1781, together with a combined fleet of 160 ships the rebels attacked and looted Amahai, one of the villages under Saparua's rule. Even though one of Prince Nuku's captains was beheaded, the rebels managed to kill Sergeant Cornelis Stephanus and a European soldier who attacked them in Itawaka.

=== Campaign of Saparua (1782) ===
The rebels then launched attack and looted other countries in Saparua and attacked Hatuana in the northern part of the island. In early February 1782, they again attacked inland of Saparua and invaded Nusalaut, burning Negeri Ameth and killing a Dutch officer.

=== Battle of Kilmury (1782) ===
The first major battle in East Seram occurred in Kilmury, where Governor Van Pleuren's Hongi fleet was involved in armed contact with Prince Nuku's fleet (led by Lukman of Keliluhu). After five hours of fighting, many of the prince's troops fled. Governor Van Pleuren's fleet burned 80 kora-kora's and caused significant damage to 44 other kora-kora's. Governor Van Pleuren's troops also burned the village.

=== Ambush at Babi Island (1782) ===
Before the fleet could unite, 64 rebel ships ambushed them on Babi Island. A ship belonging to the kings of Nusalaut and three other ships along with all their weapons were captured. Gnatahoedij Mardika and Raja Soya drowned, and 29 other men also drowned or were killed or captured by the rebels.

=== Raid on Haruku (1782) ===
In May 1782, the rebels surprised the residents of Haruku at night, burning Hulaliu, Kariu, and Pelauw. A number of Dutch subjects were captured or executed. The rebels then moved to Negeri Liang under Hila rule, destroying settlements there (including a VOC post in Lokki and a Sago factory)

=== Expedition to South Seram (1782–1783) ===
In 1782, the Dutch increased their military campaign to crush the rebellion. In this year, the Ambon government launched at least three expeditions to various places in the region. In February, under the command of Officer Johan Sigbrand Borgguits, a number of ships were sent to sail around the South Seram Sea. When the fleet arrived there, the rebels had already fled. The villages supporting the rebels were destroyed.

A second expedition launched in May proved a failure. During the third expedition, which took place between October 1782 and January 1783, Hongi visited most of the important settlements in Seram. Ambon's Governor Van Pleuren promised assistance to his subjects and pardoned those who chose to surrender. However, the orangkaya and kings who were known as rebels were still detained and replaced by loyalists. Once again a number of villages were burned as an example.

=== Expedition to Gamrange (1783) ===
To suppressed the revolt Dutch launched the military expedition. Under command Translator Coenraad Van Dijk was assigned to send an expedition to Gamrange and Raja Ampat, Papua. He departed on 25 May 1783. On 25 September 1783, the Governor received information that the Papuans had welcomed the Tidore fleet under Van Dijk's command. This sparked hope that the apparent cooperation would lead the Papuans to submit and ultimately abandon Prince Nuku. Later, on 3 October 1783, the Governor of Ternate received news from the expedition fleet itself.

At the end of September 1783, Van Dijk, European soldiers, and a number of native burghers were massacred by rebels on the island of Batanta. This situation was made worse by information that all the artillery on board the ship was distributed among Prince Nuku's followers. Papuans who had previously formally declared their submission and were assumed to support the VOC fleet proved to be defectors. One hundred and twenty ships from Maba, Patani, and Papua, appeared at Gane and Saketa. Sultan Hairun, who was appointed by the VOC and other sangaji on board the ship, had defected to the rebel side. Two hundred Ternate people were arrested.

=== Battle of Gorong (1791) ===
The Battle of Gorong (Dutch: Gorong Oorlog), also called the Battle of Gorom, was part of the thirty-year war and major battles of Sultan Nuku from the Sultanate of Tidore. More than half of the Nuku War took place in East Seram.

On 23 May 1791, the peak of the battle occurred on Kataloka Beach. Two VOC flagships were burned. Captain Gobius was trapped in a small river between Ondor and Kataloka. Nuku and King Bessy's troops attacked Gobius' troops from two opposite directions. The captain, who had experience in European wars, fell with a gunshot wound to the left thigh and a spear in the left stomach, dying on the spot. Hundreds of Gobius troops died on the coast of Gorom. Captain Walterbek followed to help but it was too late, while Admiral Straring withdrew his troops and returned to Banda.

=== Reconquest of Tidore (1796–1797) ===
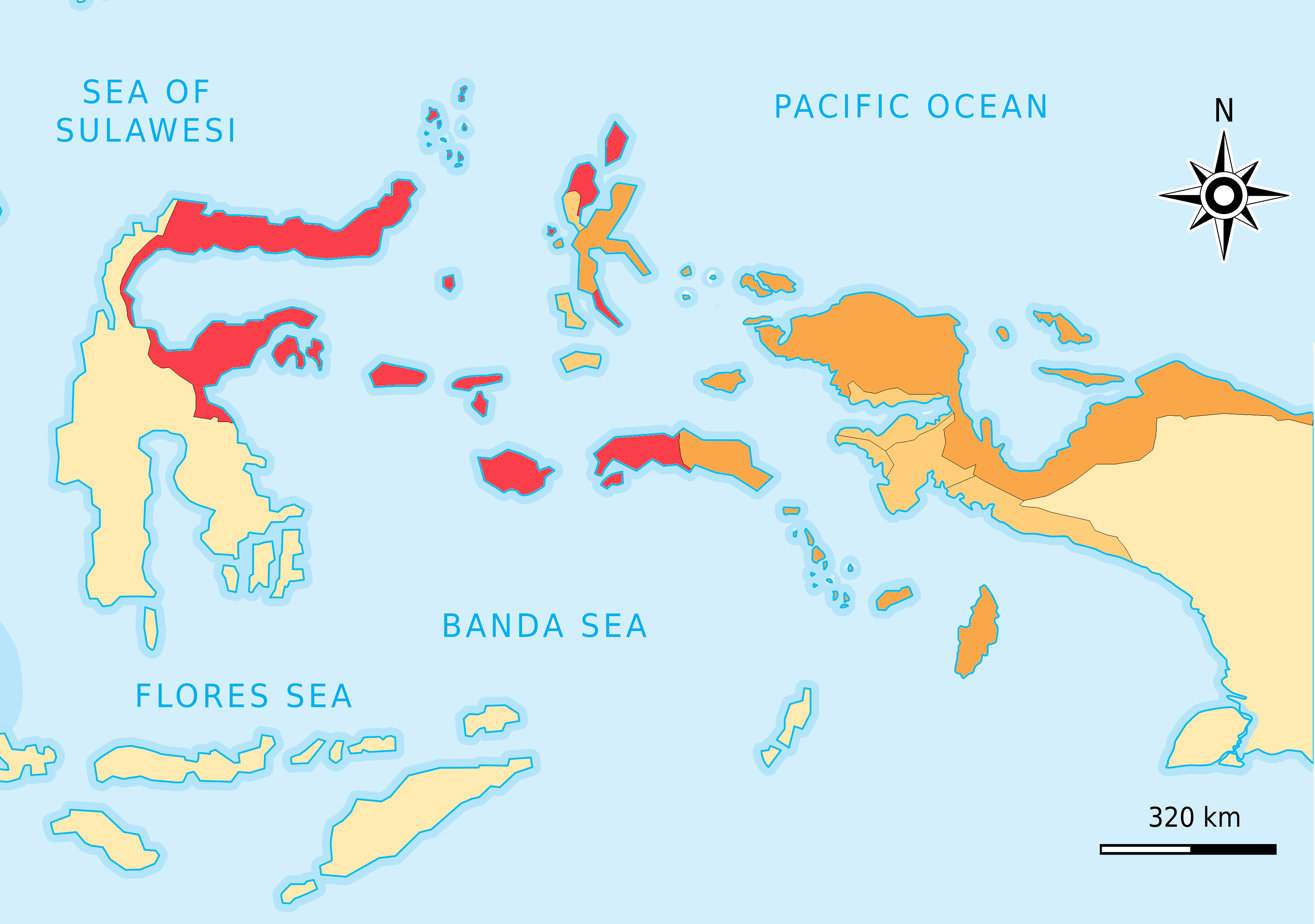
Territories associated with Ternate (red) and Tidore (orange), and Tidore vassals (light orange), at the end of the VOC era. The extent of political influence shifted over the centuries.

In 1796, British forces seized Banda Island. In the same time Nuku and his forces consolidated the military campaign around Maluku Islands, Kamaluddin of Tidore send an letters to Governor Budach about the weapon aid. Sultan of Ternate reporting some rebel actions on island of Makian. Meanwhile, Arahal of Ternate make the situation worse by not entered the meeting with Dutch and the Sultan suspected to joined the rebel actions.

The British also gave limited assistance to Amiruddin to take control of Tidore Island on 12 April 1797, after surrounding the island with 79 kora-kora's and one British ship. In the Tidore the rebel forces captured 5 Dutch ships and plundered the Dutch post at Tidore, after that the rebels forces defend and liberating the Tidore from Dutch hands and make the Dutch situation are worse.

=== Conquest of Bacan (1797) ===
In 1780, Nuku aimed to conquer Bacan, a small island in North Maluku. According to Prince Nuku, conquering Bacan was an integral part of unifying Maluku. The political situation in Bacan during Prince Nuku's rebellion is unclear. In sources, there is no evidence of communication between Prince Nuku and the Sultan of Bacan or vice versa.

=== Conquest of Ternate (1798–1801) ===
The conquest of Ternate was a military campaign by Prince Nuku to liberating the Maluku islands from Dutch and capturing the most strategic islands to support his rebellion. Shortly after the Siege of Ternate, Nuku and his forces conquered Ternate.

In their first siege of Ternate on 22 January 1801, British forces under Lieutenant-Colonel Daniel Burr rejected an offer of assistance from Sultan Nuku, even though a large fleet of prahu and Kora-Kora had appeared at the anchorage under the command of Prince Mayor. The prince remained a short distance away during this failed attack.

In the second siege, a stronger force was placed in the vanguard after the Resident of Malacca, William Farquhar, concluded that he had no choice but to accept the help of the prince of Tidore. A Briton, Captain Lynch, was ordered to organize the Tidore troops, teaching them to fire 9-pound cannons. The siege lasted for two months before the Ternate government finally surrendered on 21 June 1801. However, Governor Cranssen refused to admit defeat.

=== Invasion of Halmahera (1804) ===
As Nuku negotiated with the Dutch in Ternate in 1804, he demanded that they should recognize the position of Muhammad Arif Bila. When they refused to do so, Nuku and Muhammad Arif Bila invaded Halmahera with a fleet of 47 kora-kora's and summoned the local elite to a conference to anchor their claims. Sultan of Jailolo set out to subjugate the old domains of the kingdom in 1804–1805.

== Second phase ==
Kamaluddin escaped to Ternate Island, and Amiruddin was unanimously elected as the new sultan of Tidore. In 1801, Amiruddin and the allied British freed Ternate from the Dutch. This marked the climax of Nuku's movement, and was one of the few victories of indigenous forces over Dutch colonial rule. However, Britain withdrew from Maluku in 1803, leaving Amiruddin to fend for himself. Amiruddin died in 1805. His brother and successor Zainal Abidin was driven out of Tidore by a renewed Dutch attack in 1806, and finally died in 1810 after a largely unsuccessful resistance.

== Aftermath ==
The Nuku Rebellion was the successful revolt of Nuku to get his Crown as Sultan after he conquered Tidore, Bacan, and Ternate, though he died in 1805 when the revolt still ongoing. His successor, Zainal Abidin, was a failed leader in that he made some bad decisions. It was an effect of this rebellion and his mistakes that Tidore was defeated by the Dutch in 1810.

== Legacy ==
Amiruddin was awarded the title National Hero of Indonesia in 1995, via Presidential Decree number 071/TK/1995.

== See also ==
- Battle of Gorong
- Invasion of the Spice Islands
