= Nuku of Tidore =

Nuku
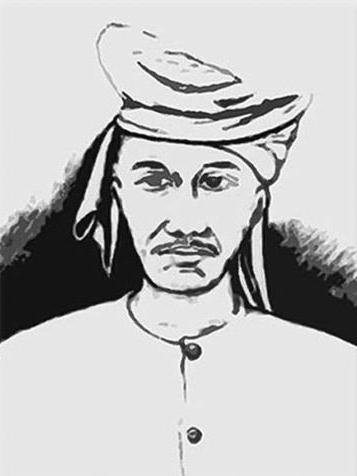
- A posthumous illustration of Nuku

Sultan of Tidore
- Reign: 1797–1805
- Predecessor: Kamaluddin
- Successor: Zainal Abidin
- Died: 14 November 1805
Regnal name
- Sultan Muhammad al-Mabus Amiruddin Syah
- Father: Sultan Jamaluddin
- Religion: Islam

Nuku (c. 1738 – 14 November 1805) was the Sultan of Tidore from 1797 to 1805. He is best known for leading the Nuku rebellion in the Maluku Islands and Papua against the Dutch colonial empire from 1780 until his death. Being a leader with great charisma, he gathered discontents from several ethnic groups and strove to restore Maluku to its pre-colonial division into four autonomous kingdoms. Nuku allied with the British against the Dutch and helped them conquer the Dutch stronghold in Ternate in 1801. In modern Indonesia he is commemorated as a pahlawan nasional (national hero).

== Background ==
Prince Nuku was born around 1738 into one of the four branches of the royal family of Tidore. Not much is known of his early years, but his father became Sultan of Tidore in 1757 under the name Jamaluddin. At this time the Dutch East India Company (VOC) had dominated the Sultanate of Tidore for a century though it was still formally autonomous. Apart from Tidore Island it encompassed parts of Halmahera, Seram, and New Guinea, which yielded foodstuff, forest and sea products that gave the sultanate a certain economic significance. However, its prestige was declining since the VOC increasingly imposed its will on Tidore and its neighbour, the Sultanate of Ternate. This was aggravated by a rebellion in the Papuan island, Salawati, and incursions by the Iranun people of southern Philippines. In 1768, the Dutch forced Sultan Jamaluddin to cede his rights to Seram, which enraged Nuku. His hatred of the VOC arose further in 1779 when his father and two brothers were arrested and exiled by the Dutch, on suspicions of misrule and conspiring with the British East India Company (EIC) and the rulers of Bacan and Maguindanao. This was followed by a new treaty in 1780 where Tidore was reduced from a Dutch ally to a vassal state.

== Early movement ==
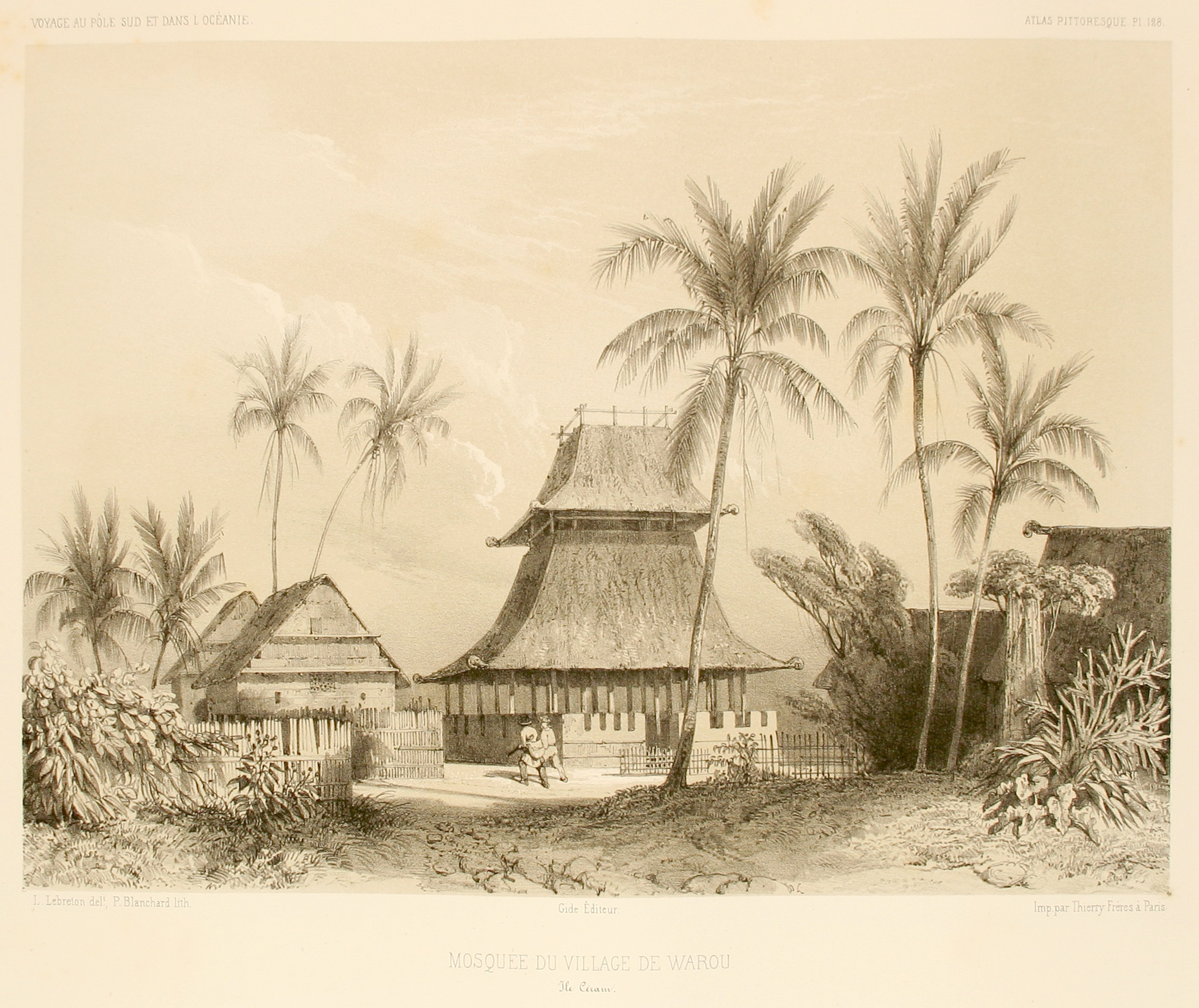
An 1846 illustration of the mosque in Waru, Seram which served as Nuku's headquarters between the 1780s and 1790s.

Nuku refused to accept the new order, and left Tidore Island in 1780, sailing with his followers to Patani in Halmahera. Establishing a local base, he was proclaimed King of the Papuans and planned to seek aid from Spanish and English ships. The communities of south-eastern Halmahera (Gamrange) and the Papuan Islands had a tradition of raiding over long distances and were co-opted by Nuku in the fight against colonial rule. Thus began a movement to restore Maluku to its old peace and prosperity. For the Papuans, especially the Biaknese, Nuku appeared as a charismatic leader able to establish Koreri, an utopian realm that would arise after toppling the existing order. For many Tidorese and other Moluccans, Nuku was a champion for all of Maluku, since the local rulers were little more than Dutch puppets. The VOC undertook a number of naval expeditions to quell the movement with varying success. After an overwhelming victory against them in 1783, Nuku forced the current Sultan Patra Alam to declare war on the Dutch. Nuku sailed over to Tidore where he was received enthusiastically, but his position did not last long.

Tidore was in turn invaded by a substantial Dutch–Ternatan force and completely defeated, more than a thousand Tidorese were killed, and Nuku had to flee. Patra Alam was deposed and exiled, and a prince from another branch, Kamaluddin, was establishing as a Dutch vassal. The VOC thus showed that it still had muscles to quell rebellions in the center. By contrast, the rebellion continued in the periphery, led by Nuku from the Raja Ampat and Seram Islands. Then, the Kei and Aru Islands were also drawn into the struggle as discontented groups joined the movement and attacked Dutch forces. On balance, the attacks of the Dutch and their appointed Sultan Kamaluddin on the rebellious areas seriously weakened Nuku's position up to the early 1790s.

== Gaining momentum ==
After 1791 the movement somehow gained in strength. The exact reasons for this are unclear, but an increasing number of people in Maluku and Papua decided to throw in their lot with Nuku. This coincided with the establishment of relations with the EIC, which had started visiting Maluku since the 1760s. Early contacts with the British did not have significant results until the EIC built a fort at Dorei on the coast of New Guinea in 1793, which brought it close to Nuku's domains. The French occupation of the Dutch Republic in 1795 had global consequences, since British forces were dispatched to occupy VOC possessions in Asia. The British based some of their ships in Gebe, which at the time was Nuku's headquarters. Ambon and the Banda Islands fell to Nuku with the assistance of two British ships in 1796, and by 1797 all VOC outposts in Moluccas had fallen, except Ternate which remained in Dutch hands.

With a considerable fleet, Nuku paid a visit to the new British governor in Ambon. The governor found Nuku to be a dignified gentleman who was well aware of European manners. Though he did not promise substantial assistance for an attack in North Maluku, the governor expressed support for Nuku's rights to the throne of Tidore. Nuku proceeded to occupy Jailolo in Halmahera with British support. Jailolo was, until its sacking in 1551 by Ternatian and Portuguese forces following a combined Tidore, Jailolo and Spanish attempt to oust the Portuguese, one of the four Moluccan kingdoms together with Ternate, Tidore and Bacan, and a restoration of the original quadripartition was seen as a step in reestablishing precolonial harmony. Nuku therefore took care to enthrone a descendant of the old Jailolo dynasty, Muhammad Arif Bila, who had previously been a jojau (first minister) in Tidore.

== Reconquest of Tidore ==
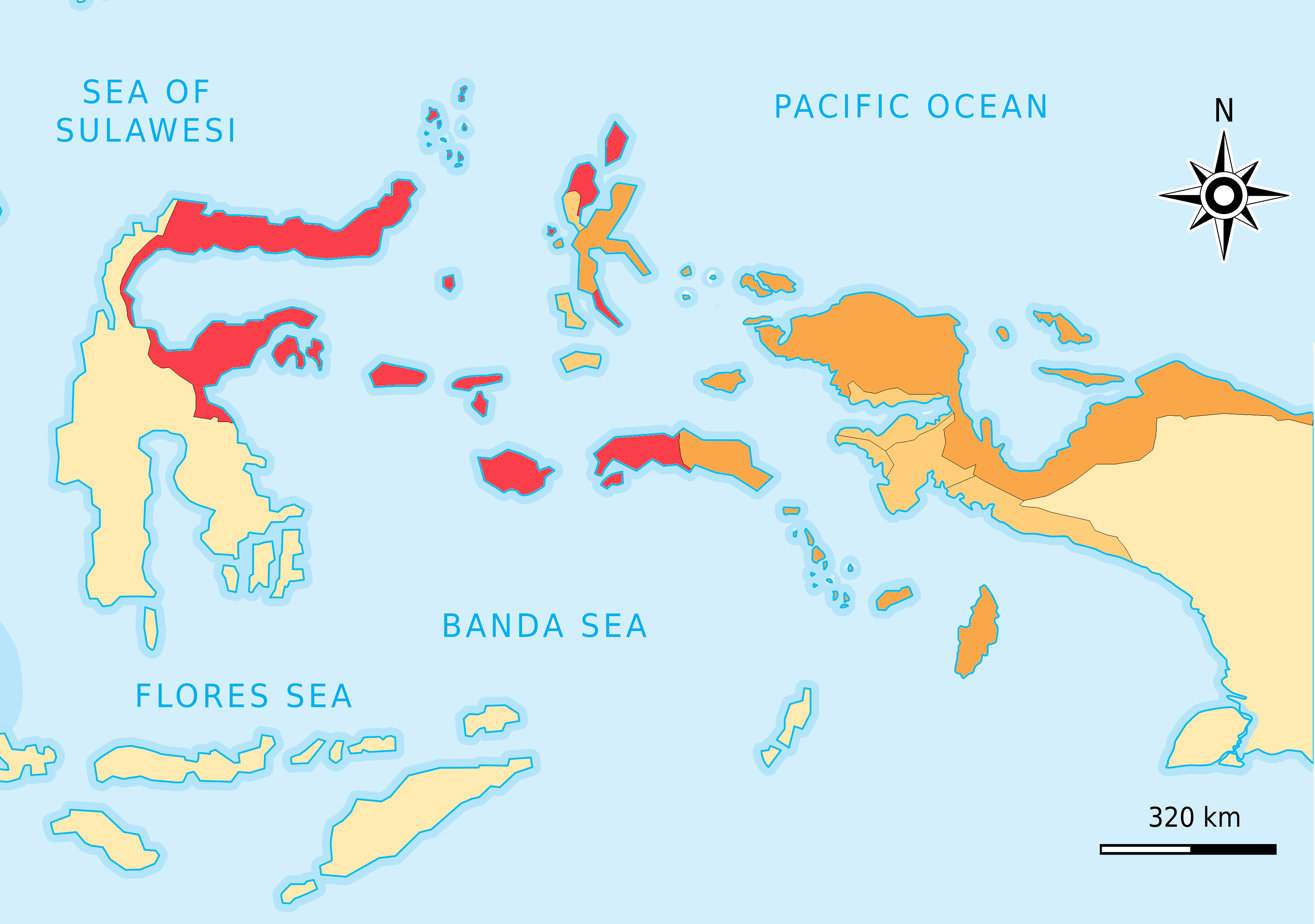
Territories associated with Ternate (red) and Tidore (orange), and vassals of Tidore (light orange)

In the next year 1797 Nuku proceeded against the Dutch positions. Bacan was occupied with the assistance of English country traders, who prevented the rebels to kill the Christian villagers. In April the rebel fleet finally reached Tidore, whose Sultan Kamaluddin had already fled to safety in Ternate. Nuku tried to attack the Dutch main fortress in Ternate, but it proved to be too strong. Instead, he put Ternate under blockade, consolidated his position and became the de facto Sultan of Tidore. As such he was called Muhammad al-Mabus Amiruddin. According to a Makassarese eyewitness, "he was surrounded by twelve bodyguards armed with swords and shields, because he had little trust in all Tidorese". In the coming years, the British began to cooperate closer with Nuku, dropping the previous non-interference policy with regard to North Maluku. The governor of Ambon, William Farquhar, combined forces with Nuku to lead a series on assaults on Ternate, whose Dutch defenders finally surrendered in June 1801. Immediately afterward, Farquhar officially proclaimed Nuku Sultan of Tidore, though he had already been the actual ruler for four years. Britain subsequently signed a treaty with Tidore where the former stood as protectors and the Sultan received an annual subsidy of 6,000 Spanish dollars in return for delivering cloves. The former Dutch policy of regularly extirpating spice trees in most areas was abandoned.

Political events in Europe put a quick end to the relationship, however. The Peace of Amiens restored most of the Dutch overseas possessions to the French-dominated Batavian Republic, and the British left in May 1803. Nuku persisted in flying the Union Jack from his residence, and the Batavian governor in Ternate opened negotiations to settle the position of Tidore. Nuku demanded that the restored Jailolo kingdom should be recognized and that his status vis-à-vis the Batavians should be "brother" rather than "child". The negotiations were delayed by the Batavians, who believed that the old Sultan could not live much longer. Earlier in 1801, the British had described him as "perfectly decrepid from persecution and continual hardships". The relations steadily worsened, especially since Sultan Jailolo repeatedly raided Ternatan territory. Eventually Nuku died on 14 November 1805, with his kingdom on the brink of war.

== Legacy ==
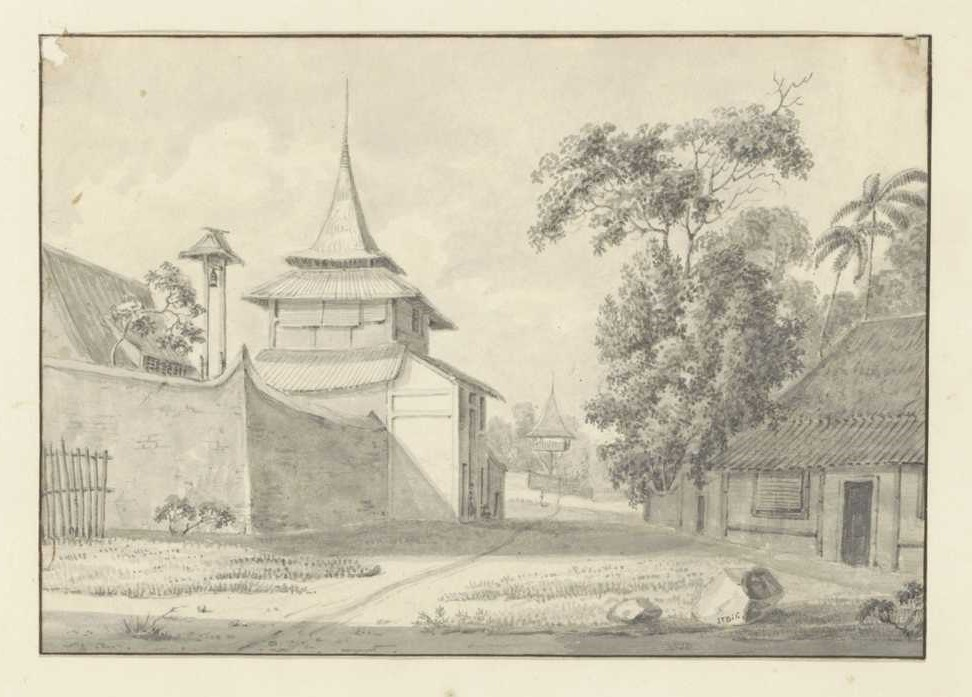
A 19th-century illustration of the entrance to Nuku's residence in Tidore.

Thanks to his persistency and charisma, Nuku had become the leading political figure in Maluku and Papua by the early 19th century. His nickname Jou Barakati, "Lord of Fortune", shows how he was perceived by people: a man of prowess imbued with a certain spiritual aura that would restore the shattered Moluccan world. He was able to attract people from a wide range of ethnicities and cultures: Tidorese, Halmaherans, Ceramese, Papuans, Arunese, etc. Nuku's movement had a strongly Muslim aspect, which did not prevent alliances with animists and Christian British, or, for that matter, Nuku's preference for strong arrack. Personally he is described as a man of very active disposition, having "the greatest good humour and uprightness". Unlike other sultans in this era, he only had one wife, known as Geboca, a sensible and caring woman who was an important advisor to her husband.

Nuku was among the very few Indonesian leaders up to the 20th century who had the best of a major contest with European colonizers. The realm constructed by him did not long survive him, however, which shows the great importance of his personality. A new Dutch attack drove out his brother and successor Sultan Zainal Abidin from Tidore in 1806 and Maluku remained steadily in European hands until 1942.

== Family ==
Nuku had nine half-brothers and half-sisters, whose loyalty to his cause shifted. One of them, Prince Hassan, schemed to topple Nuku as Sultan but was murdered under obscure circumstances in 1800. Another, Prince Zainal Abidin, held a vacillating position by was finally appointed to succeed his brother. A purported brother known by the title Jou Mangofa made himself king in the Aru Islands in 1787 but was killed in about 1790. With his wife Geboca (or Habiba Sinobe), Nuku sired two sons and a daughter:

- Soangare Saifuddin
- Fangare Talabuddin
- Boki Nafisa

None of these ever succeeded to the throne, but Soangare's descendant Haji Djafar Dano Junus became titular Sultan of Tidore in 1999.

== See also ==
- List of rulers of Maluku
- Tidore Sultanate
- Sultanate of Ternate
- Sultanate of Jailolo
- Sultanate of Bacan
- Nuku Rebellion

Nuku of Tidore
Preceded by Kamaluddin	Sultan of Tidore; 1797–1805	Succeeded by Zainal Abidin
