= Zainal Abidin Syah =

Zainal Abidin Alting
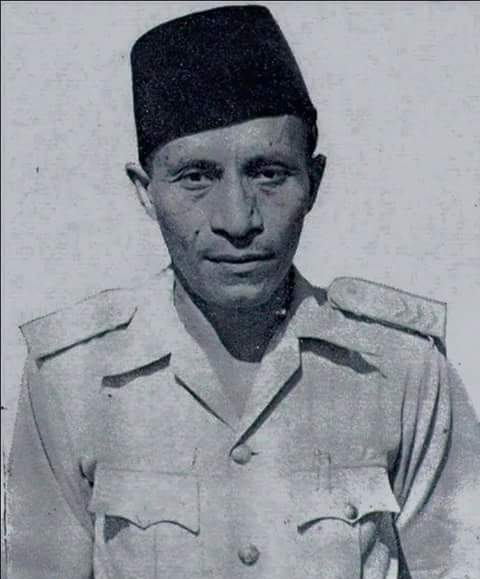

Sultan of Tidore
- Reign: 1947–1967
- Predecessor: Interregnum (preceded by Iskandar Sahajuhan)
- Successor: Sultanate lapsed
- Born: 5 August 1912; Soasiu, Tidore
- Died: 4 July 1967 (aged 54)
- Father: Dano Husain (ibn Amir ibn Abi Bakar)
- Mother: Salma
- Religion: Islam

Sultan Zainal Abidin Alting Syah (born Soasiu, Tidore, 5 August 1912 – died Ambon, Maluku, 4 July 1967) was the 26th Sultan of Tidore in Maluku Islands, reigning from 1947 to 1967. He was also the appointed Governor of Irian Barat (West Papua) in 1956–1962 before the actual inclusion of Irian Barat in Indonesia, serving official Indonesian claims against Dutch colonial rule.

== Early years ==
Zainal Abidin Alting was born in Soasiu, the main town of Tidore Island, in 1912. His father Dano Husain was the great-grandson of Sultan Ahmad Saifuddin Alting (d. 1865). Malukan royalty were often named after Dutch cities and officials, in this case Governor General Willem Arnold Alting. His mother was called Salma and his brothers were Amir, Halni and Idris. At this time the Sultanate was vacant since the demise of the last incumbent in 1905, and the affairs of the zelfbesturende landschap (self-ruling territory) were handled by a regency council. After being educated in Batavia and Makassar, Zainal Abidin served as official in the Dutch colonial bureaucracy in Ternate, Manokwari and Sorong. When Japan invaded and occupied the Dutch East Indies in 1942, Zainal Abidin was made chief of the local government in Tidore for a while. Towards the end of the war he evoked the displeasure of the Japanese and was exiled to Halmahera.

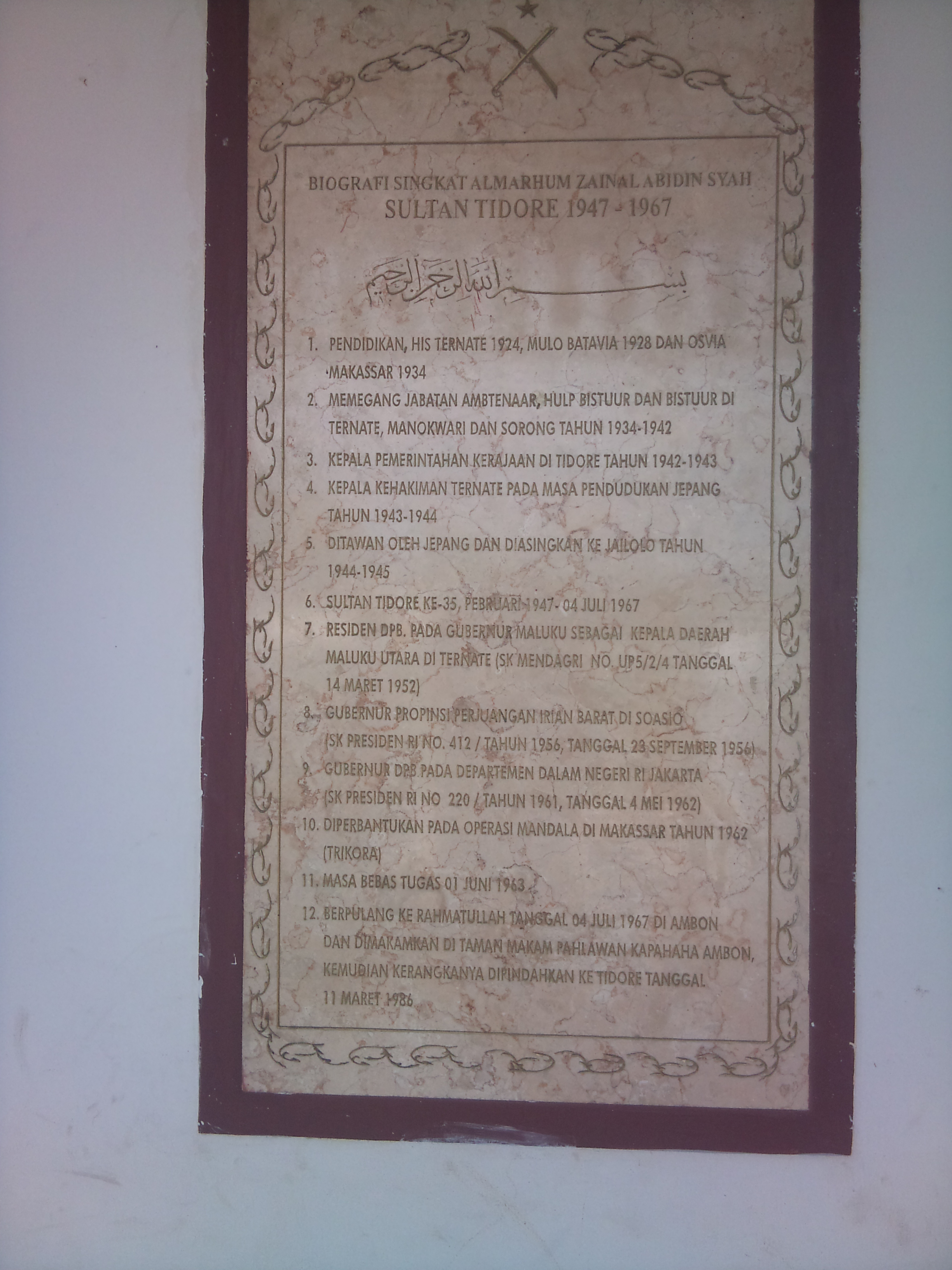
Plaque in Tidore with biographical data about Sultan Zainal Abidin.

== Sultan of Tidore ==
After the capitulation of Japan the Dutch tried to re-establish their position in the East Indies and created a pseudo-state, the State of East Indonesia in 1946. This included Maluku, Sulawesi and the Lesser Sunda Islands. Being a person with administrative experience, Zainal Abidin was appointed Sultan of Tidore in late 1946 and took up his functions in February 1947. Thus the Sultanate was revived after an interregnum of 42 years. In spite of the colonial background to his position, he was well regarded by the republican government of Sukarno after 1949. In 1952 he was appointed head (kepala) of the territory of North Maluku with his seat in Ternate. At the same time, the anti-feudal atmosphere in post-liberation Indonesia made the old kingdoms look increasingly anachronistic, and they were by and by replaced by modern bureaucratic functions.

== West New Guinea dispute ==
Parts of West New Guinea had been counted under the Sultan of Tidore since at least the 17th century, but after 1949 the Netherlands maintained their colonial rule over the half-island for its lucrative resources and strategic interests, for securing its economic interests in Indonesia, and to repopulate it with fleeing Indo people. The Sukarno government strove to incorporate this remaining Dutch East Indies territory in the Indonesian Republic to complete the Revolution. On 17 August 1956, President Sukarno announced the formation of the Propinsi Perjuangan Irian Barat (Struggle Province of West Irian) with its capital in Soasiu in Tidore. The Indonesian government argued that Papua and its adjacent islands had belonged to the now-Indonesian Tidore Sultanate for hundreds of years. He therefore appointed Sultan Zainal Abidin as Governor on 23 September 1956 (Presidential Decision 142/1956). As kepala of North Maluku he was succeeded by the Sultan of Bacan. His tenure coincided with worsening Indonesian-Dutch relations. Diplomatic relations were broken off in 1960 and the Sukarno government began to purchase arms to be able to confront the Dutch positions in New Guinea.

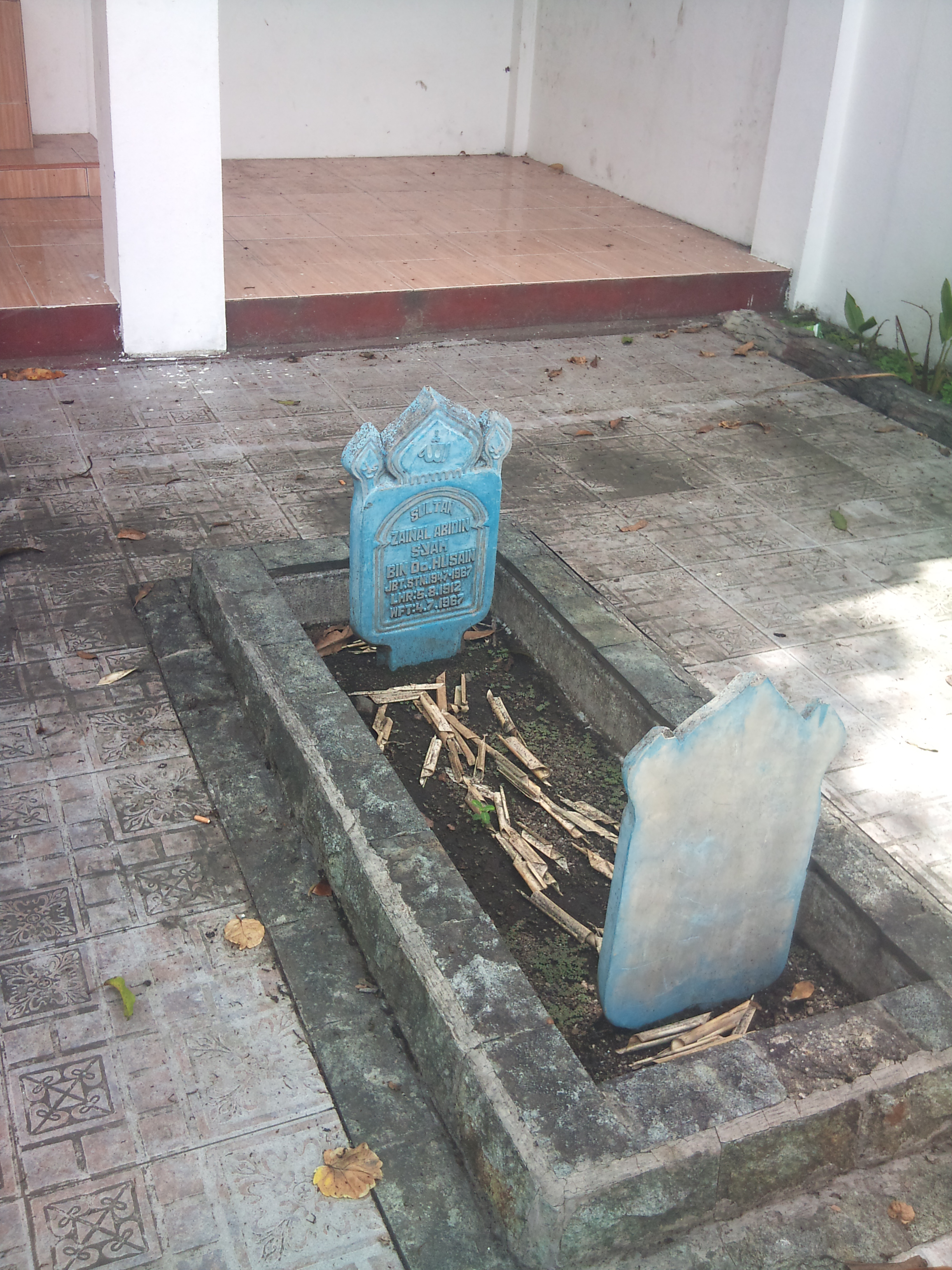
The grave of Sultan Zainal Abidin, close to the palace compound in Tidore.

The military Operation Trikora started in December 1961, and eventually led to a political solution whereby Indonesia annexed West New Guinea (1963). While the operation was going on, Zainal Abidin's term ended, and he was replaced as governor by P. Pamuji in 1962. After his tenure, Zainal Abidin withdrew to Ambon, where he died on 4 July 1967 and was buried in the Taman Makam Pahlawan Kapahaha Ambon (Heroes' Graveyard of Kapahaha, Ambon). Although he left a son, Mahmud Raimadoya, no new sultan was appointed, as the sultanate had been practically defunct since some years. With the law concerning local government in 1965, the traditional aristocrats in Maluku were no longer accorded a position in the formal government. Much later, his remains were moved to Tidore, where he was reburied on 11 March 1986 at the Sonyine Salaka (Golden Yard) where the old palace had been situated. A titular Sultan, from another branch of the dynasty, was eventually chosen in 1999.

== Legacy ==
In 2025, Zainal Abidin was declared a National Hero of Indonesia.

== See also ==
- List of rulers of Maluku
- Tidore Sultanate
- West New Guinea dispute

Zainal Abidin Syah
Preceded by Interregnum	Sultan of Tidore; 1947-1967	Succeeded by Sultanate lapsed
