= Patani, Indonesia =

Patani
- Village
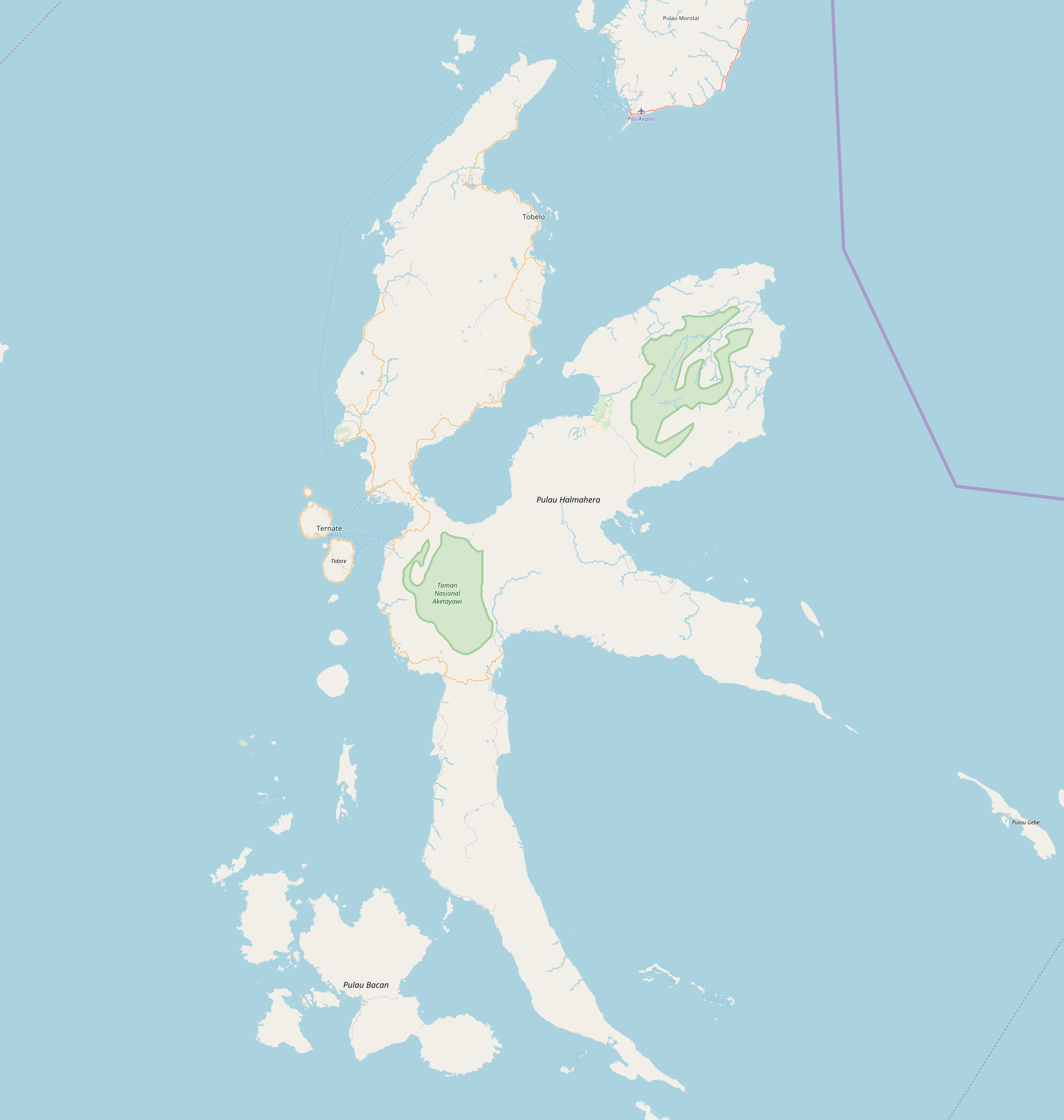
- Location of the town in Halmahera
- Coordinates: 0°14′43″N 128°45′49″E
- Country: Indonesia
- Province: North Maluku
- Island: Halmahera
- Regency: Central Halmahera Regency
- Time zone: UTC+7 (WIB)

Patani is a coastal region in North Maluku, Indonesia, located on the eastern peninsula of Halmahera. Tepeleo is the biggest town in the area which is located within the Central Halmahera Regency. The area is perhaps most well known for its high-quality nutmeg, although cocoa, copra, palm oil and coconut crab are known to be produced in the region.

The area is subject to large-scale mining and industrial farming, where the general population typically engage in fishing, subsistence farming and tourism (due to the widespread natural beauty). It is generally understood that education, employment and wealth can only be found by leaving the area to pursue educational opportunities elsewhere due to the low levels of local education, wealth and the lack of local post-education pathways.

The Sultan of Tidore is thought to have social influence over this area where the area was absorbed into the Tidore Kingdom in the 6th century. As a consequence, the general population is overwhelmingly understood to identify as Islamic, although Islam is typically interwoven with pre-Islamic traditional cultural and religious practices. There is thought to be widespread suspicion to outsiders due to the past religious conflict in the early 2000s.
