= Bacan Malay =

Language in North Maluku

- Native to: Indonesia
- Region: North Maluku
- Ethnicity: Bacan
- Native speakers: ~4,500 (2018)
- Language family: Austronesian: Malayo-Polynesian; Malayic; Bacan Malay

Language codes
- ISO 639-3: btj
- Glottolog: baca1243

Bacan Malay or Bacan is a Malayic language spoken on the island of Bacan in North Maluku province, Indonesia, by the minor Bacan people. It is an anomalous presence in the region, being surrounded by genetically distant Austronesian languages and languages of the unrelated North Halmahera family. Bacan is geographically removed from the Malay heartlands in the western archipelago.

It is sharply distinct from other eastern Indonesian varieties of Malay (including North Moluccan Malay), differing both in its typology and historical origins. The Bacan people are thought to be a Malayic community that migrated from Borneo some centuries ago, preserving its native language. Nonetheless, Bacan Malay has received much influence from the local languages of Maluku, as seen in its lexicon and grammar.

Older information on Bacan Malay is scarce and largely lexical. A 1958 article provides some grammatical and lexical notes, comparing Bacan to standard Malay/Indonesian. No major descriptive efforts were made during the colonial period, but Bacan did receive some linguistic attention in the 1980s. J.T. Collins has done much research work in the area, describing Bacan as well as demonstrating its Malayic nature. A 2022 Bacan-English dictionary is available.

== Language use ==
Bacan Malay is spoken by the Bacan ethnic group, which numbers perhaps 3,500 people. It is traditionally used as a first language in five villages (Indomut, Awanggo, Amasing, Labuha, and Mandawong). A marker of ethnic identity for the Bacan people, it is not generally known by other ethnic groups. The sporadic assertion about its lingua franca role has been noted to be mistaken. Bacan remains an in-group and home language, with more recent migrants only having rudimentary, if any, knowledge of it.

The language, confined to a small community, is definitely endangered, with a decreasing number of speakers. In the late 1950s, it was still reported to be a common means of communication in the Bacan area. The 16th edition of Ethnologue reports a 1991 figure of 2,500 speakers. In 1996, it was estimated to have less than 5,000 speakers, residing in a few villages. The 22nd edition of Ethnologue reports that it is spoken by six people. Collins (2018) estimates that it is spoken by approximately 5% of Bacan Island's largely migrant population of 90,000. The Bacan Islands are also home to speakers of North Halmahera languages (especially Tobelo, Galela, and Ternate), languages of Southeast Sulawesi, as well as the two Makian languages (Taba and Moi). The dominant lingua franca of the region is Ternate Malay (North Moluccan Malay). Other languages of wider significance include Indonesian, as well as the local language of Ternate.

A language related to Bacan was reportedly spoken in the Obi archipelago, further south of Bacan. However, no trace remains of such a variety, and the coastal areas of Obi are now inhabited by other migrant communities.

== History ==
Bacan belongs to the Malayic languages (and is sometimes listed as a dialect of Malay). It is therefore very distinct from most languages in the North Maluku region; moreover, it is only remotely related to other eastern Indonesian varieties of Malay, such as Ambonese Malay and Ternate Malay, the two major linguae francae of the Moluccas. Unlike those languages, which are often thought of as Malay-based creoles, Bacan Malay is not known to have developed as a trade language. Instead, it appears to have been transplanted by a migrant Malayic community, arriving from Borneo several hundred years ago. Collins (1996) considers it to be an offshoot of Brunei Malay and a relatively close relative of Banjarese, spoken in Kalimantan.

In contrast to contact varieties of Malay, it has been passed as a first language from generation to generation, a fact still reflected in its complex inflectional system, as well as its preservation of indigenous Malay proverbs. While showing many innovations, it also retains a number of archaic features not universally found in other Malayic languages (or standard Malay). Lexical retentions include the numerals tolu (‘three’), dulapang (‘eight’), and salapang (‘nine’). The Bacan community must have maintained a high level of language loyalty, considering that for much of its history, it probably numbered no more than a few hundred people. However, the impact of the surrounding Moluccan languages on Bacan Malay is considerable, and its relationship to Brunei Malay has been obscured by the separate development of both languages. A small number of its lexical items and grammatical traits can be associated with the Taliabu and Sula languages, but none of those are indicative of a genealogical relationship.

During the colonial era, it was linked to Sula, as well as certain languages of Sulawesi, a classification reflected in older linguistic literature, drawing upon a 1914 work by N. Adriani and A.C. Kruyt. It was thought to be a "mixed language" (mengtaal) or a non-Malayic language with extensive Malay influence, and its Malayic character remained largely unrecognized. However, as early as 1869, A.R. Wallace described it as a form of "pure Malay" with a "Papuan element", and its relationship to Malay was also noted in a 1958 article by R.D. Udinsah. In 1985, K.A. Adelaar included Bacan in his Malayic group. In more recent times, J.T. Collins has further elaborated on the historical development and characteristics of Bacan, establishing its affinity to western Malay varieties. A dictionary has also been produced (2022).

== Works cited ==
- Adelaar, K. Alexander; Prentice, David J.; Grijns, Cornelis D.; Steinhauer, Hein; van Engelenhoven, Aone (1996). "Malay: its history, role and spread". In Wurm, Stephen A.; Mühlhäusler, Peter; Tryon, Darrell T. (eds.). Atlas of Languages of Intercultural Communication in the Pacific, Asia, and the Americas: Vol I: Maps. Vol II: Texts. Trends in Linguistics. Documentation 13. Berlin/New York: Mouton de Gruyter. pp. 673–693. doi:10.1515/9783110819724.2.673. ISBN 978-3-11-081972-4. OCLC 1013949454.
- Adelaar, K. Alexander (1992). Proto Malayic: The reconstruction of its phonology and parts of its lexicon and morphology. Pacific Linguistics C-119. Canberra: Department of Linguistics, Research School of Pacific Studies, Australian National University. doi:10.15144/PL-C119. ISBN 0-85883-408-1. OCLC 26845189.
- Collins, James T. (1982). "Linguistic Research in Maluku: A Report of Recent Field Work". Oceanic Linguistics. 21 (1/2): 73–146. doi:10.2307/3623155. ISSN 0029-8115. JSTOR 3623155.
- Collins, James T. (1994a). "Dialek Melayu Bacan". Ensiklopedia sejarah dan kebudayaan Melayu: A–E (in Malay). Kuala Lumpur: Dewan Bahasa dan Pustaka, Kementerian Pendidikan, Malaysia. pp. 630–631. ISBN 983-624-246-5. OCLC 34186039.
- Collins, James T. (1994b). "Dialek Melayu Maluku". Ensiklopedia sejarah dan kebudayaan Melayu: A–E (in Malay). Kuala Lumpur: Dewan Bahasa dan Pustaka, Kementerian Pendidikan, Malaysia. pp. 655–656. ISBN 983-62-4246-5. OCLC 34186039.
- Collins, James T. (1995). "Dialek Melayu di Pulau Kalimantan dan Bahasa Bacan: Misanan atau Mindoan?". In Soenjono Dardjowidjojo (ed.). PELLBA 8: Pertemuan Linguistik Lembaga Bahasa Atma Jaya Kedelapan (in Indonesian). Yogyakarta: Penerbit Kanisius. pp. 225–266. ISBN 979-497-490-0. OCLC 68842136.
- Collins, James T. (1996a). "The Brunei Sultanate and the eastern archipelago: the nature of the linguistic evidence". In Hj Mohd. Taib Osman; Hj Abdul Latif Hj Ibrahim (eds.). Proceedings of the International Seminar On Brunei Malay Sultanate 13–17 November 1994. Vol. 1. Bandar Seri Begawan: Akademi Pengajian Brunei, Universiti Brunei Darussalam. pp. 140–160. OCLC 40953974.
- Collins, James T. (1996b). "Borneo and Maluku: the evidence from the language of Bacan". In Martin, Peter W.; Poedjosoedarmo, Gloria; Ozóg, Conrad (eds.). Language Use and Language Change in Brunei Darussalam. Monographs in International Studies, Southeast Asia Series 100. Athens: Ohio University Centre for International Studies. pp. 73–88. ISBN 0-89680-193-4. OCLC 35033718.
- Collins, James T. (2018). Penelitian Bahasa di Maluku (PDF) (in Indonesian). Ambon: Kantor Bahasa Provinsi Maluku, Kementerian Pendidikan dan Kebudayaan. ISBN 978-602-52601-2-4. OCLC 1099540304.
- Collins, James T. (2022). Bacan–English dictionary. Sleman, Yogyakarta: Deepublish. ISBN 978-623-02-4828-3.
- Eberhard, David M.; Simons, Gary F.; Fennig, Charles D., eds. (2019). "Malay, Bacanese". Ethnologue: Languages of the World (22 ed.). Dallas: SIL International. Archived from the original on 2019-04-11.
- Grimes, Charles E.; Grimes, Barbara D. (1994). "Languages of the North Moluccas: a preliminary lexicostatistic classification". In Masinambow, E.K.M. (ed.). Maluku dan Irian Jaya. Buletin LEKNAS III (1). Jakarta: Lembaga Ekonomi dan Kemasyarakatan Nasional, Lembaga Ilmu Pengetahuan Indonesia (LEKNAS-LIPI). pp. 35–63. OCLC 54222413.
- Hidayah, Zulyani (2015). Ensiklopedi Suku Bangsa di Indonesia (in Indonesian). Vol. 2. Jakarta: Yayasan Pustaka Obor Indonesia. ISBN 978-979-461-929-2. OCLC 913647590.
- Kluge, Angela (2017). A grammar of Papuan Malay. Studies in Diversity Linguistics 11. Berlin: Language Science Press. doi:10.5281/zenodo.376415. ISBN 978-3-944675-86-2. OCLC 1030818290.
- Lewis, M. Paul, ed. (2009). "Malay, Bacanese". Ethnologue: Languages of the World (16 ed.). Dallas: SIL International. Archived from the original on 2012-12-15.
- van Minde, Don (1997). Malayu Ambong: Phonology, Morphology, Syntax. Leiden: Research School CNWS. ISBN 90-73782-94-5. OCLC 38075818.
- Steinhauer, Hein (1991). "Malay in east Indonesia: the case of Larantuka (Flores)". In Steinhauer, Hein (ed.). Papers in Austronesian linguistics No. 1. Pacific Linguistics A-81. Canberra: Department of Linguistics, Research School of Pacific Studies, Australian National University. pp. 177–195. doi:10.15144/PL-A81.177. ISBN 0-85883-402-2. OCLC 646958819.
- Udinsah, R.D. (1958). "Bahasa Indonesia daerah Batjan". Medan Bahasa (in Indonesian). 8: 29–31.
- Wallace, Alfred Russel (1869). The Malay Archipelago: The Land of the Orang-utan and the Bird of Paradise: a Narrative of Travel, with Studies of Man and Nature. Vol. 2. London: Macmillan and Co.
