= Makian people =

Ethnic group in Indonesia

Makian
Makeang

Total population
- 20,000 (2010)

Regions with significant populations
- Indonesia (Makian and Halmahera)

Languages
- West Makian and East Makian (L1); North Moluccan Malay, Ternate, and Indonesian (L2)

Religion
- Sunni Islam

Related ethnic groups
- Bacan; Ternate; Tidore

The Makian people (Makeang) is an ethnic group originating from Makian Island in the province of North Maluku, Indonesia. However, they can also be found in Ternate, Tidore, Kayoa, Mare, the west coast of Halmahera, Malifut in North Halmahera, the Obi Islands, and the Bacan Islands. The Makian people are divided into two sub-groups, namely West Makian (Jitine) and East Makian (Tabayana). Both speak very different and unrelated languages, namely Jitine language (a Papuan language) and Tabayana language (a Austronesian language). The population is around 20,000. The Jitine people call Makian Island Moi, while the Tabayana people call it Taba.

The majority of Makian people work as farmers with the main commodities being cloves, rice, nutmeg, bananas, sweet potatoes, corn, sweet potatoes, and cassava. Since ancient times, Makian has been famous as an island producing quality cloves and nutmeg. Some of the agricultural systems used are settled and others still use a shifting cultivation system.

== Society and migration ==
The mountainous geographical conditions of Makian Island are also marked by the presence of a volcano, namely Mount Kie Besi, which has erupted several times and claimed thousands of lives, as well as the property of its residents. Because of this, the Indonesian government has gradually since 1975 moved some of its population to Malifut in North Halmahera as local transmigrants. This will also have an impact on the sectarian conflict that occurred in the Maluku Islands.

The number of Makian people according to the 1930 population census data was 15,236 people. The details are that 11,579 people live on Makian Island and the rest live outside the island. Over time, the number continued to grow, but it has also spread beyond Makian Island, especially in Moti, Kayoa, Ternate, Tidore, Bacan, Obi, and the mainland of Halmahera. They are known as an ethnic group that frequently migrates. This is driven by factors explained above, especially because the region is vulnerable to natural disasters and also due to economic factors.

== Languages ==
The Makian people speak two very different and mutually incomprehensible languages, namely West Makian (Jitine; a Papuan language) and East Makian (Tabayana; a Austronesian language). Apart from that, due to historical factors, also driven by the fact that the people like to migrate, the Makian people are also able to speak using Ternate and North Moluccan Malay — a creole variety rooted in Malay and used throughout the northern Maluku Islands since the time of the sultanates of Ternate and Tidore.

== Settlements ==
The Makian people houses in the villages of Makian Island are built along the roads, but not in clusters. Each village consists of 100 to 200 houses, although there are also some densely populated villages with more than 200 to 500 houses. The building materials for the houses are not the same, some are made of plank huts, semi-permanent ones and some are permanent ones. Every house has a yard planted with vegetables, bananas, and others. The Makian houses in the new settlement of Malifut are all nearly identical. The most prominent public buildings are the mosque and the school. Communication between villages is usually via land routes, but also via sea routes.

== See also ==
- East Makian language
- West Makian language
- Makian Island
