= Tidore language =

West Papuan language spoken in Indonesia

Tidore
- Native to: Indonesia
- Region: North Maluku, islands of Tidore, Maitara, Mare, northern half of Moti, and some areas of west coast of Halmahera
- Ethnicity: Tidore people
- Native speakers: (26,000 cited 1981); 20,000 L2 speakers (1981)
- Language family: West Papuan?: North Halmahera; Ternate–Tidore; Tidore
- Writing system: Latin script, Arabic script (historically)

Language codes
- ISO 639-3: tvo
- Glottolog: tido1248
- ELP: Tidore
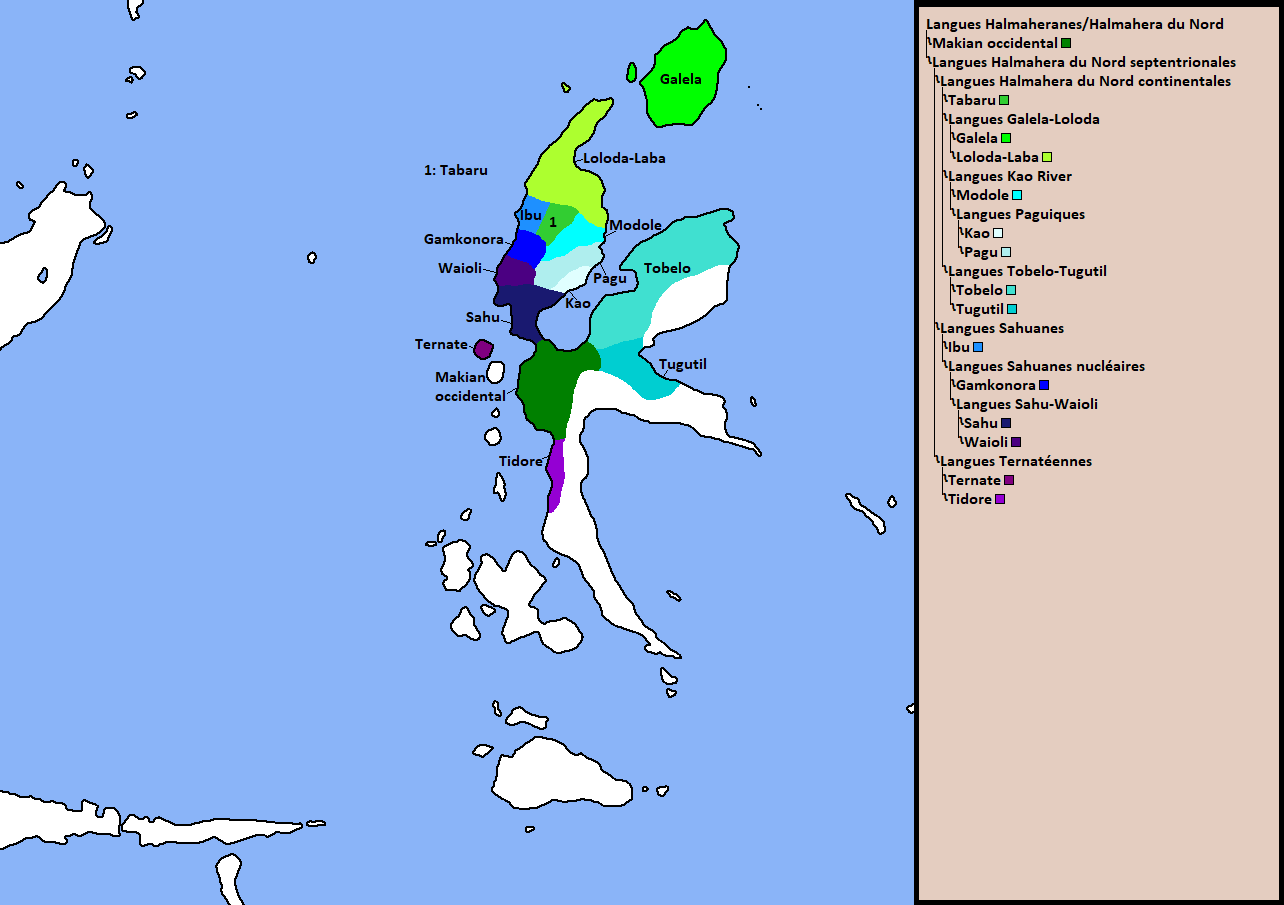
- Map of the North Halmahera languages (including Tidore)

- Location in Southeast Asia
- Coordinates: 0°1′N 127°44′E

Tidore is a language of North Maluku, Indonesia, spoken by the Tidore people. The language is centered on the island of Tidore, but it is also spoken on the neighbouring islands of Mare and Moti to the south, and Maitara to the northwest of Tidore, as well as in some areas of the neighbouring Halmahera. Historically, it was the primary language of the Sultanate of Tidore, a major Moluccan Muslim state.

A North Halmahera language, it is unlike most languages in Indonesia which belong to the Austronesian language family. Tidore and other North Halmahera languages are perhaps related to languages of the Bird's Head Peninsula, West Papua.

Tidore is a regional lingua franca, used for interethnic communication in the Central Halmahera area. Since the 17th century, it had some influence as a trade language in the Moluccan-New Guinean region. It is closely related to Ternate, of which it is sometimes considered a dialect. Both Ternate and Tidore have been recorded in writing at least since the late 15th century, being the only non-Austronesian (or "Papuan") languages of the region with indigenous (pre-European) literary traditions.

All Tidore speakers are also conversant in North Moluccan Malay, the language of wider communication, and the contact between Malay and Tidore has left a great mark on the local language. There are many North Moluccan Malay and Indonesian loans in Tidore, and the language exhibits strong Austronesian influence in general.

== Phonology ==
=== Consonants ===
		Labial	Alveolar	Palatal	Velar	Glottal
Nasal		m	n	ɲ	ŋ	
Plosive	voiceless	p	t	c	k	
Plosive	voiced	b	d	ɟ	ɡ	
Fricative		f	s			h
Lateral			l			
Tap			ɾ			
Approximant		w		j		

A flap consonant can be heard as alveolar or post-alveolar [ɾ̠].

=== Vowels ===
	Front	Central	Back
Close	i		u
Mid	e		o
Open		a	
