= Cakalele (journal) =

- Discipline: Cultural and ethnic studies
- Language: English

Publication details
- History: 1990-2000
- Publisher: University of Hawaii at Manoa Center for Southeast Asian Studies (United States)
- Frequency: annual

Standard abbreviations
- ISO 4: Cakalele

Indexing
- ISSN: 1053-2285

Links
- Journal homepage

Cakalele: Maluku Research Journal/Majalah Penelitian Maluku is an academic journal that publishes the results of research about Maluku and Maluku communities in Indonesia and the Netherlands. The journal chronicles the growth of Maluku in humanities and the sciences as it expands geographically. Cakalele is stored on the ScholarSpace institutional repository of the University of Hawaii at Manoa. The journal was founded by linguist James T. Collins.
