= Ambonese people =

Indonesian ethnic group

Ambonese
Orang Ambon
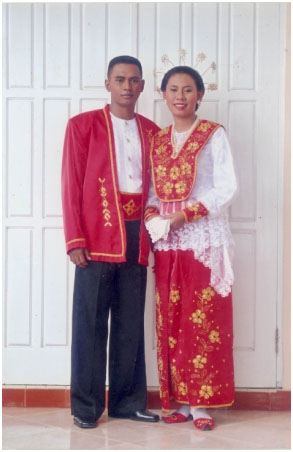
- Ambon bride and groom in traditional attire.

Total population
- c. 1.590.000

Regions with significant populations
- Indonesia; Netherlands; Suriname; Australia; United States
- Indonesia (Maluku): c. 1.500.000
- Netherlands: c. 90.000

Languages
- Ambonese Malay, bahasa tanah, Indonesian (in Indonesia), Dutch (in Netherlands)

Religion
- 69,5% Christianity (66.2% Protestant and 3.3% Roman Catholic), 30.5% Sunni Islam

Related ethnic groups
- Melanesians, Polynesians, Moluccans, Malagasy

The Ambonese (Orang Ambon) are an ethnic group of mixed Austronesian and Melanesian origin from Ambon Island and the southwest of Seram Island in Indonesia's Maluku Province. Additionally, there are about 35,000 Ambonese living in the Netherlands. As of the 2007 census, there were 258,331 Ambonese living in Ambon, Maluku. The Ambonese are predominantly Christian with a significant Muslim minority.

== Language ==
An Ambonese Malay speaker, recorded in the United States.

The dominant language is Ambonese Malay, also known as Ambonese. It developed as a trade language in the central part of Maluku and is spoken as a second language elsewhere in Maluku. Many Ambonese speak their own regional languages, which are collectively known as bahasa tanah. Fluency in bahasa tanah is most common in Muslim communities, whereas in Christian villages they have mostly been replaced by Ambonese Malay. Additionally, many Ambonese people speak Indonesian, especially around Ambon City and other urban areas, such as Jakarta.

== Religion ==
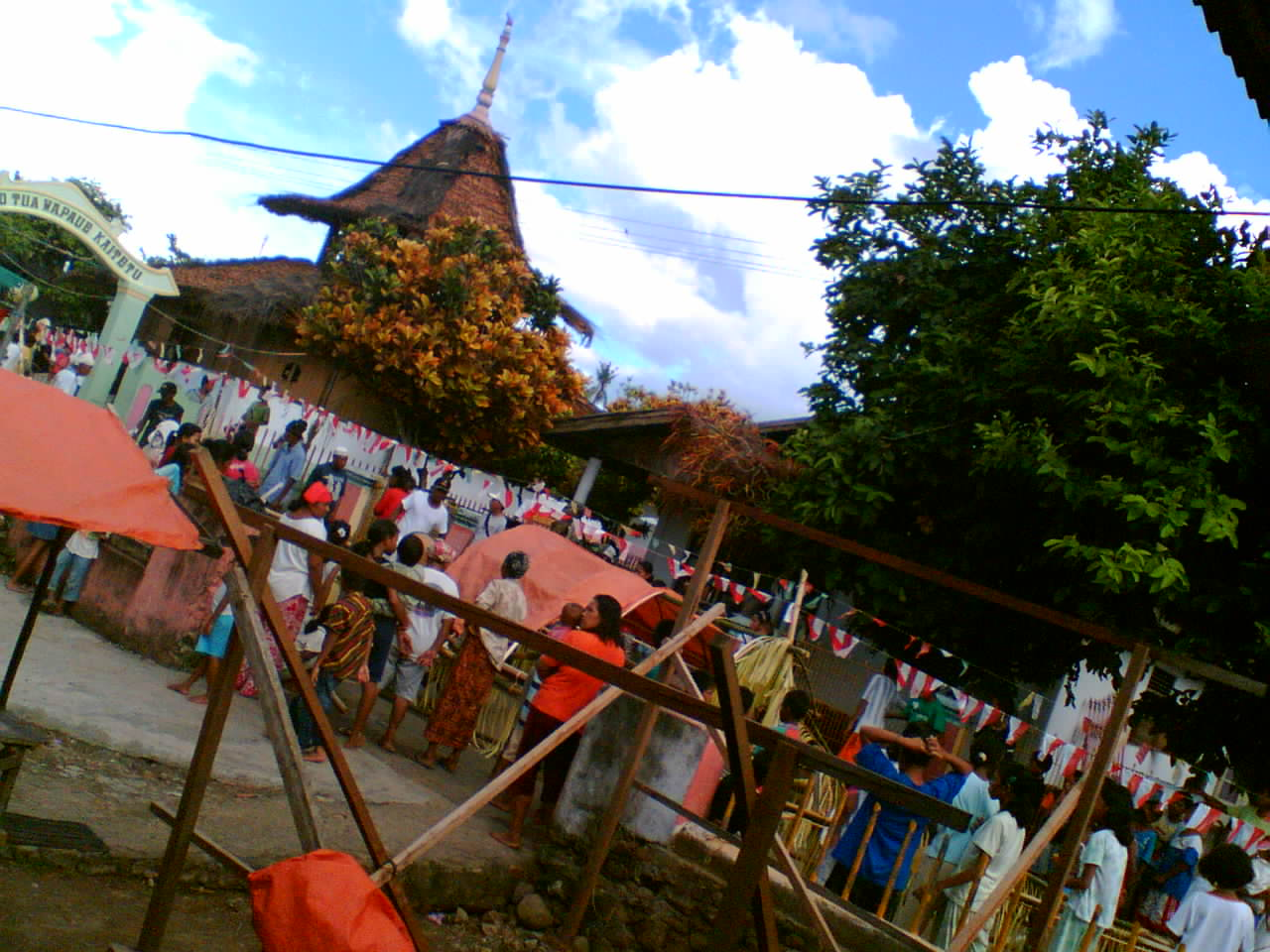
Oldest mosque in Ambon.

The predominant religions of the Ambonese are Christianity (Reformed Christianity and Roman Catholicism) and Sunni Islam. According to Mikhail Anatolievich Chlenov, relations between the adherents of both faiths have generally been peaceful, based on the community bonds through pela, a type of blood-brother relationship. However, he also mentions that clashes between Ambonese people and other non-indigenous ethnic groups occur on religious grounds. Rising tensions in the 1990s resulted in the 1998 Maluku sectarian conflict. With the threat of civil war, many were forced to move to refugee camps in Ambon, with divisions solidifying between Muslim and Christian communities. The conflict resulted in thousands of casualties and up to 700,000 people displaced.

== History ==
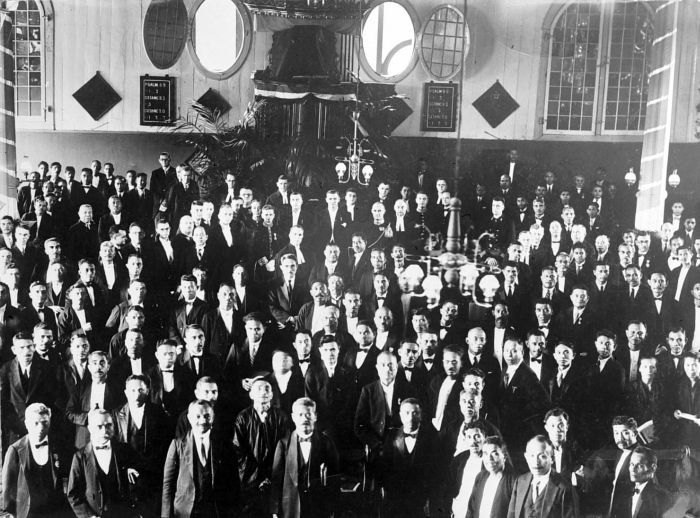
A group of men after the institute of the M.P. in a church in Ambon, pre-1943.

Ambon was first colonized by Portugal in 1526, before being occupied by the Dutch in 1605 in an attempt to monopolize the nutmeg trade, ultimately resulting in the Amboyna massacre. There was significant population mixing between the indigenous populations of Ambon Island and Seram Island, the victims of the international slave trade, and immigrants from other parts of Indonesia and Europe. The spice trade established under the rule of the Sultanate of Ternate was also seized by the Portuguese and Dutch.

The Ambonese people resisted Dutch colonization into the 19th century. By the mid-19th century, however, many had Europeanized and achieved a privileged position in Indonesia. These wealthy townspeople (nicknamed "black Dutch" by Europeans) were legally equated with the ruling colonizers and were involved in state and military services. Many indigenous customs such as tattooing have largely disappeared as a result of this assimilation.

During the Indonesian National Revolution of 1945–1949, large groups of Ambonese people, especially members of the colonial army, emigrated to the Netherlands and New Guinea.

== Economy ==
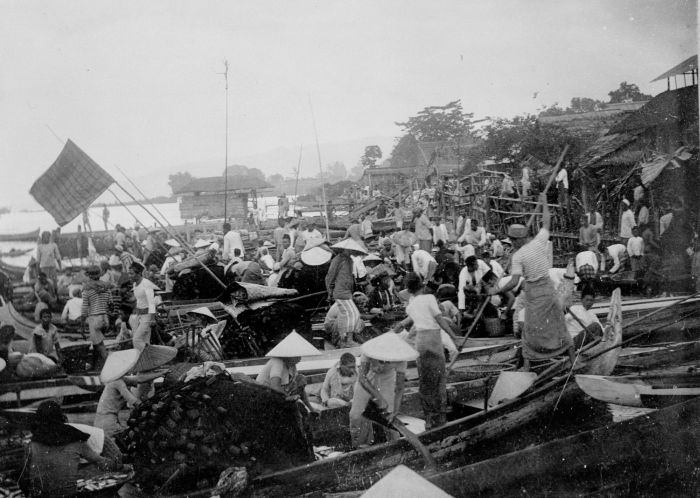
The arrival of the fishermen at Ambon, Maluku, pre-1919.

Ambon is a center of production of spices such as carnation and nutmeg, as well as sago. Fishery, agriculture, horticulture, and small trades are also common means of earning a living in Ambon. Ambonese craftsmen work in various industries such as pottery, blacksmithing, weapons making, shipbuilding, carving on tortoiseshell and mother of pearl, making ornamental crafts from carnation buds, and weaving boxes and mats from strips of palm leaves.

== Social structure ==
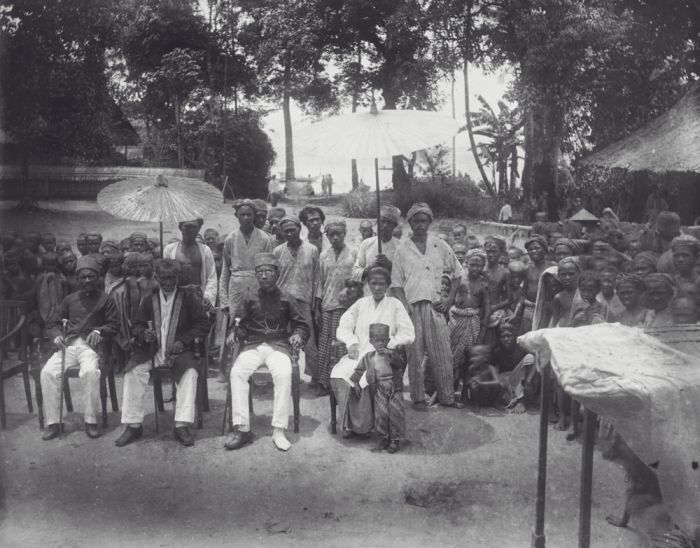
A portrait of the King and his entourage in Ambon, Maluku, between 1890 and 1915.

Many Ambonese live in traditional rural communities called negeri, headed by a leader called a raja. Communities are divided into territorial groups called soa, which consist of patrilineal clans called mata ruma. Marriage ceremonies are performed only within sectarian groups, traditionally in the form of patrilocal marriages. Relations between members of the community are governed by traditional norms of behaviour called adat. Today, adat largely governs matters of family, inheritance and land rights, and elections for leadership positions.

== Culture and lifestyle ==
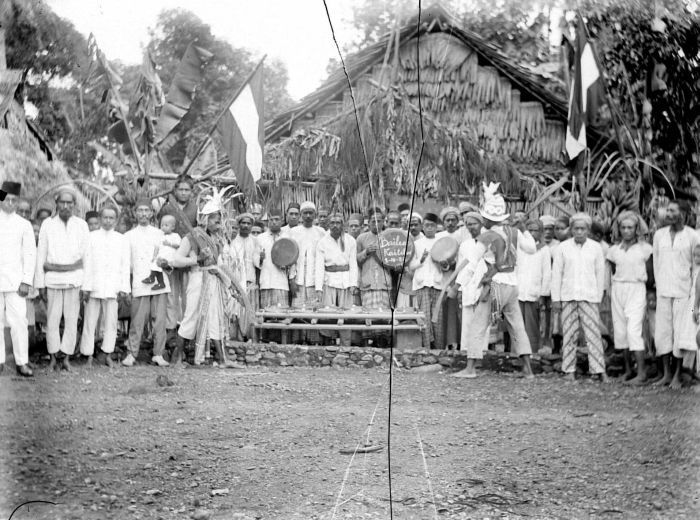
A group portrait of Ambonese people with musical instruments.

A typical Ambonese village consists of about 1,500 people who live in houses made from woven sago leaves or plastered bamboo, wood, and coral stones on stone foundations. The people cultivate the surrounding hillsides. Traditional rural settlements of Ambonese people are located on the shore and have a linear layout. Houses are built on stilts.

=== Clothing ===
Men adopted modern European-style clothing due to colonization, only on special occasions wearing short jackets and black trousers. Women often wear thin blouses or small-patterned sarongs. Older women typically wear black, while younger women typically wear bright colored cotton dresses up to knee-length.

=== Food ===
The basis of the Ambonese diet is porridge made from sago starch, vegetables, taro, cassava, and fish. The inhabitants of the Ambon Island also have access to imported rice.

=== Music ===
The Ambonese people have a rich musical folklore which has absorbed many European musical elements—for example, the Ambonese quadrille (katreji) and the songs of the lagoon, which are accompanied by a violin and lap steel guitar. Traditional musical instruments include the 12 gongs, drums, bamboo flute (efluit), xylophone (tatabuhan kayu) and the Aeolian harp.
