= BTJ =

BTJ or btj may refer to:

- BTJ, the IATA code for Sultan Iskandar Muda International Airport, Banda Aceh, Indonesia
- btj, the ISO 639-3 code for Bacan Malay, North Maluku, Indonesia
- Brian Thomas Jr. (born 2002), American football player
