= Moti Island =

Island and district in North Maluku, Indonesia

Moti
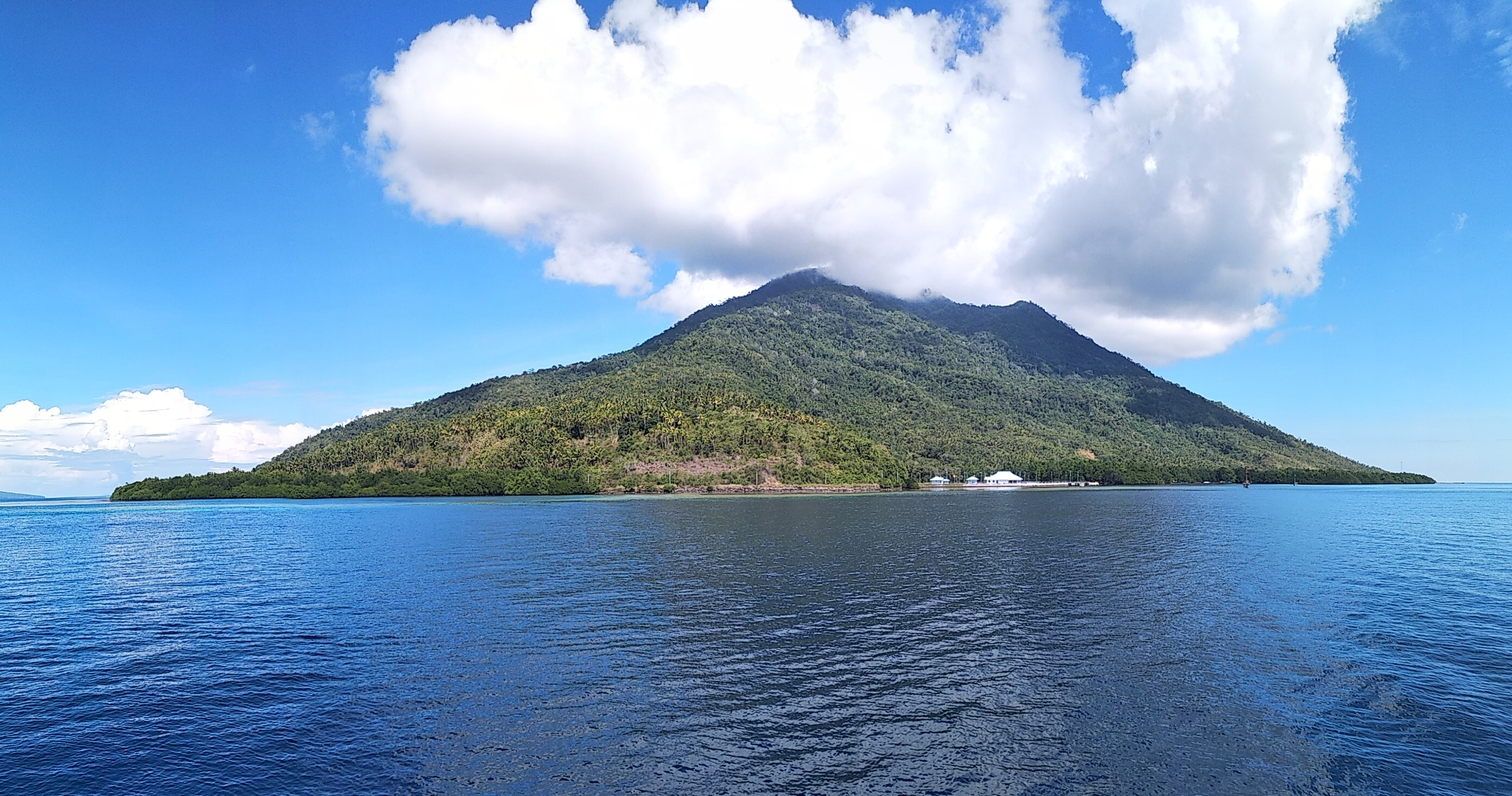

Highest point
- Elevation: 950 m (3,120 ft)
- Coordinates: 0.45°N 127.40°E

Geography
- Location: Halmahera, Indonesia

Geology
- Mountain type: Stratovolcano
- Last eruption: Unknown

Moti or Motir is a volcanic island in the western side of Halmahera island, Indonesia. While administratively part of the city of Ternate, it is situated between the islands of Tidore and Mare to its north and Makian to its south. The 5 km wide island is surrounded by coral reefs. Its summit is truncated and the volcano contains a crater at the south-west side.

Moti has an area of 24.78 km^{2} and a population of 4,811 as at the 2020 Census; the official estimate as at mid 2023 was 4,680. The inhabitants speak the Tidore language (except for a small number in the south of the island, who speak the East Makian language). It is governed as the district (kecamatan) of Moti within the City (kota) of Ternate.

== See also ==
- List of volcanoes in Indonesia
