= Bahasa tanah =

Collective term for a native languages in the Maluku Islands, Indonesia

Bahasa tanah (Ambonese Malay: bahasa tana; lit. "language of the land") is a collective term referring to the non-Malayic indigenous languages of the Maluku Islands in Indonesia. These languages are primarily used in traditional or ceremonial contexts today. On Seram Island and surrounding areas, bahasa tanah is especially used during traditional rituals known as panas pela.

Among the Maluku people, bahasa tanah is regarded as sacred and superior in status to everyday spoken languages. As a result, these languages are typically known only by elder speakers. In the Banda Islands, bahasa tanah is used in ceremonial chants or songs known as kabata.

== Etymology ==
The term tanah (meaning 'land') symbolizes origin and sacredness. It reflects the belief that land is the source and foundation of life. In traditional contexts, tanah represents purity and authenticity, hence the use of bahasa tanah to describe sacred ceremonial speech.

== Usage ==
There are approximately 117 identified bahasa tanah languages spoken across the Maluku Province. Some have become extinct, particularly among Christian communities in regions such as Ambon Island and parts of Seram Island. The use of bahasa tanah among Christian Moluccans was documented by Georg Eberhard Rumphius in 1687, specifically in the villages of Hative Besar and Hitulama. He noted that their languages differed significantly from nearby languages such as Ternate, Makassar, and Banda. Both of the bahasa tanah he mentioned are now extinct.

Among Muslim communities, bahasa tanah is still used in ceremonial and communal contexts. James T. Collins has conducted extensive research on the extinction of certain bahasa tanah and published the Asilulu–English Dictionary to help preserve one such language from Ambon Island. Even though it is still the mother tongue for those who live mainly in villages and the interior, nowadays its use is slowly being replaced by Ambonese Malay and Indonesian. It is recorded that many bahasa tanah have become extinct, or many are even threatened with extinction due to the lack of speakers.

== See also ==
- Alifuru script
- Languages of Indonesia
- Liturgical language
