= Mare Island (Indonesia) =

Island in North Maluku, Indonesia

Mount Mare

Highest point
- Elevation: 308 m (1,010 ft)
- Coordinates: 0.57°N 127.40°E

Geography
- Location: Halmahera, Indonesia

Geology
- Mountain type: Stratovolcano
- Last eruption: Unknown

Mare (called Pottebackers by the Dutch) is a small volcanic island to the west of Halmahera island, Indonesia. Measuring 2 km by 3 km, the island covers a land area of 6.09 km^{2}, and is part of the volcanic arc chain of stratovolcanoes what lie off the west coast of Halmhera, from Hiri in the north to Makian in the south. Historically, once discovered by the modern Europeans in the late 17th century (and possibly sooner), the Europeans (i.e. Dutch or Spanish), had come to colonize the people and introduce the system of Mercantilism.

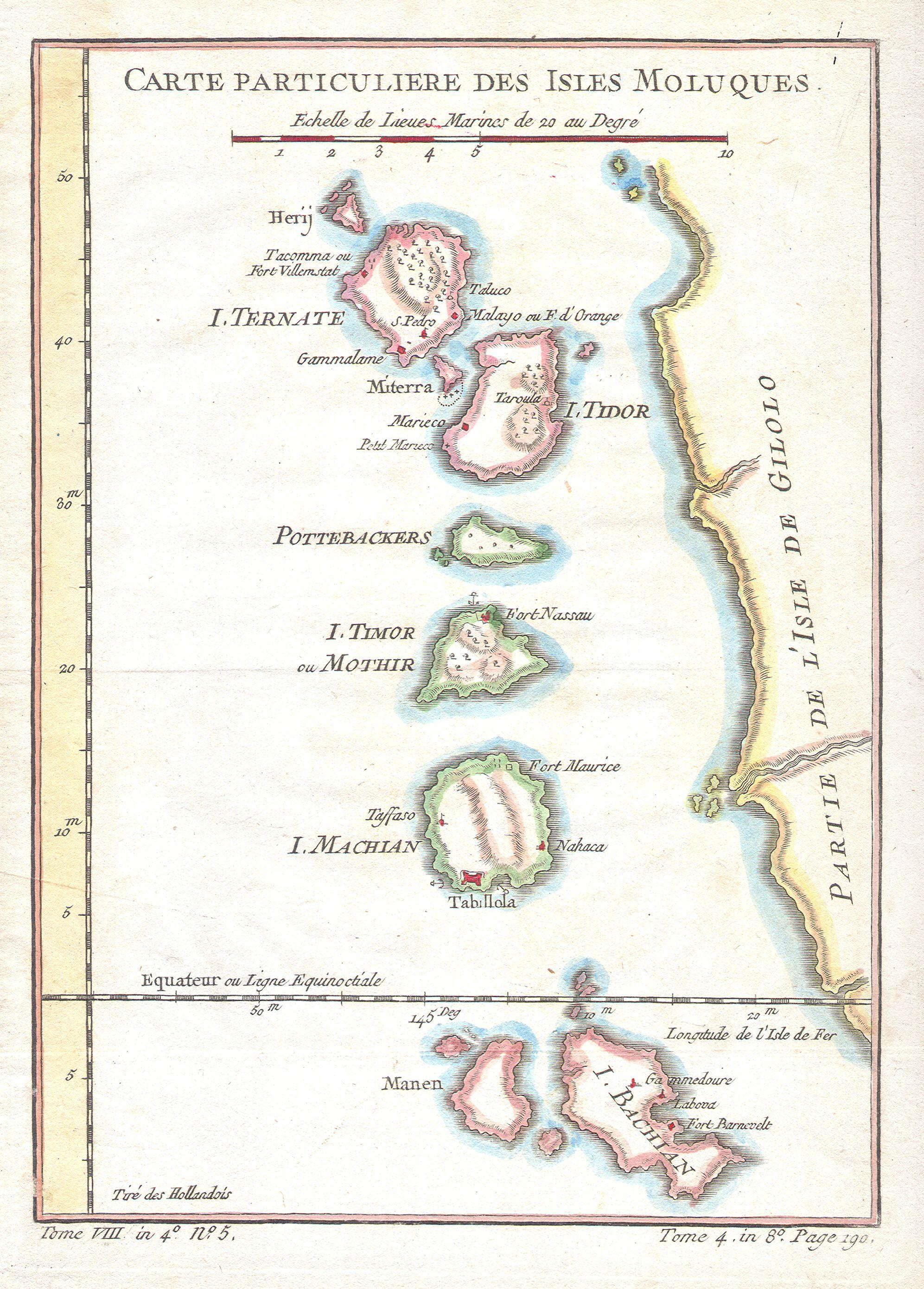
French map of Jacques-Nicolas Bellin (1760)

== Population and administration ==
As at mid 2023, the island had a population of 968. It is administered as two villages (desa) of Tidore Selatan District within Tidore Islands City. The two villages are Maregam in the northeast and Marekofo in the southwest.

The original inhabitants of this island were the Tidore people who arrived in 1018. Gradual migration of the Makian people followed in the 17th to 19th centuries. During the Dutch colonial period, Europeans, Makassarese, and Chinese also settled in the island of Mare, which at that time was controlled by the Ternate Sultanate. The composition of the population gradually became the Mare people which from the beginning was dominated by the Tidore ethnicity, culture, and language.

== See also ==
- List of volcanoes in Indonesia
