= Tidore people =

Ethnic group in Indonesia

Tidore
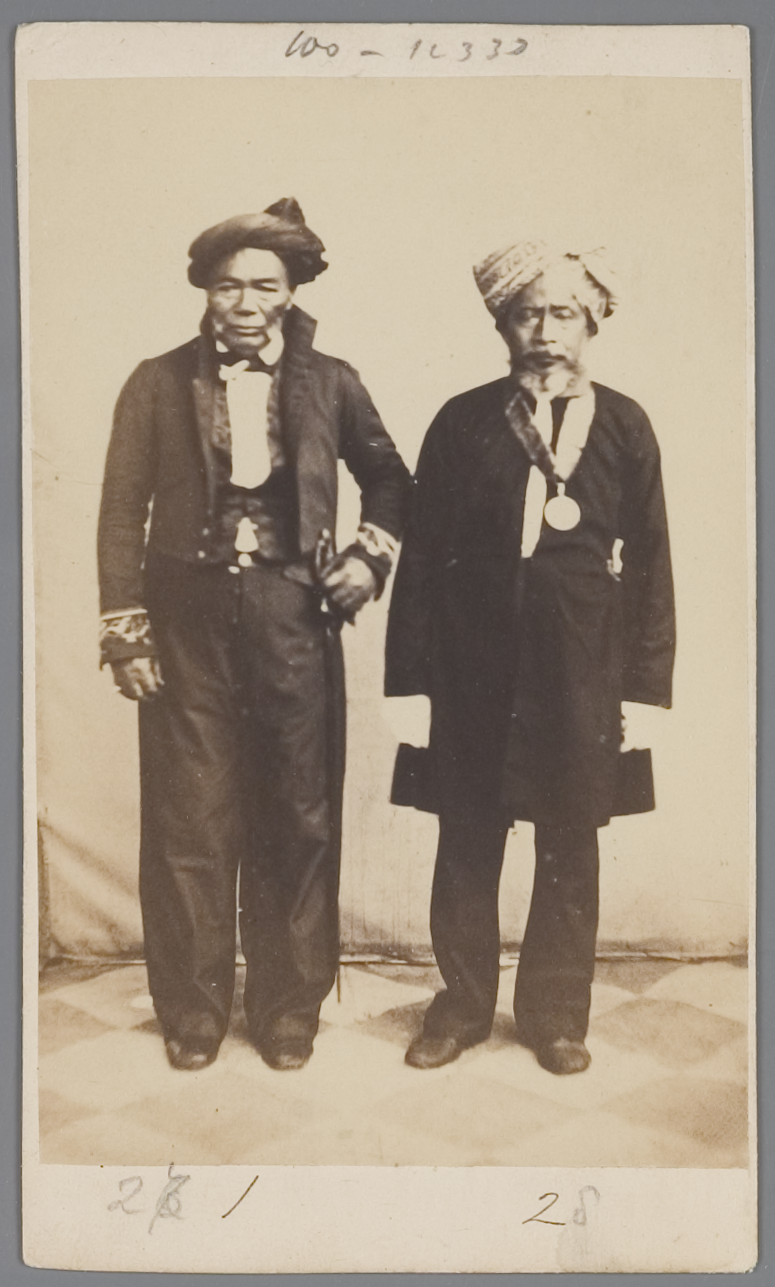
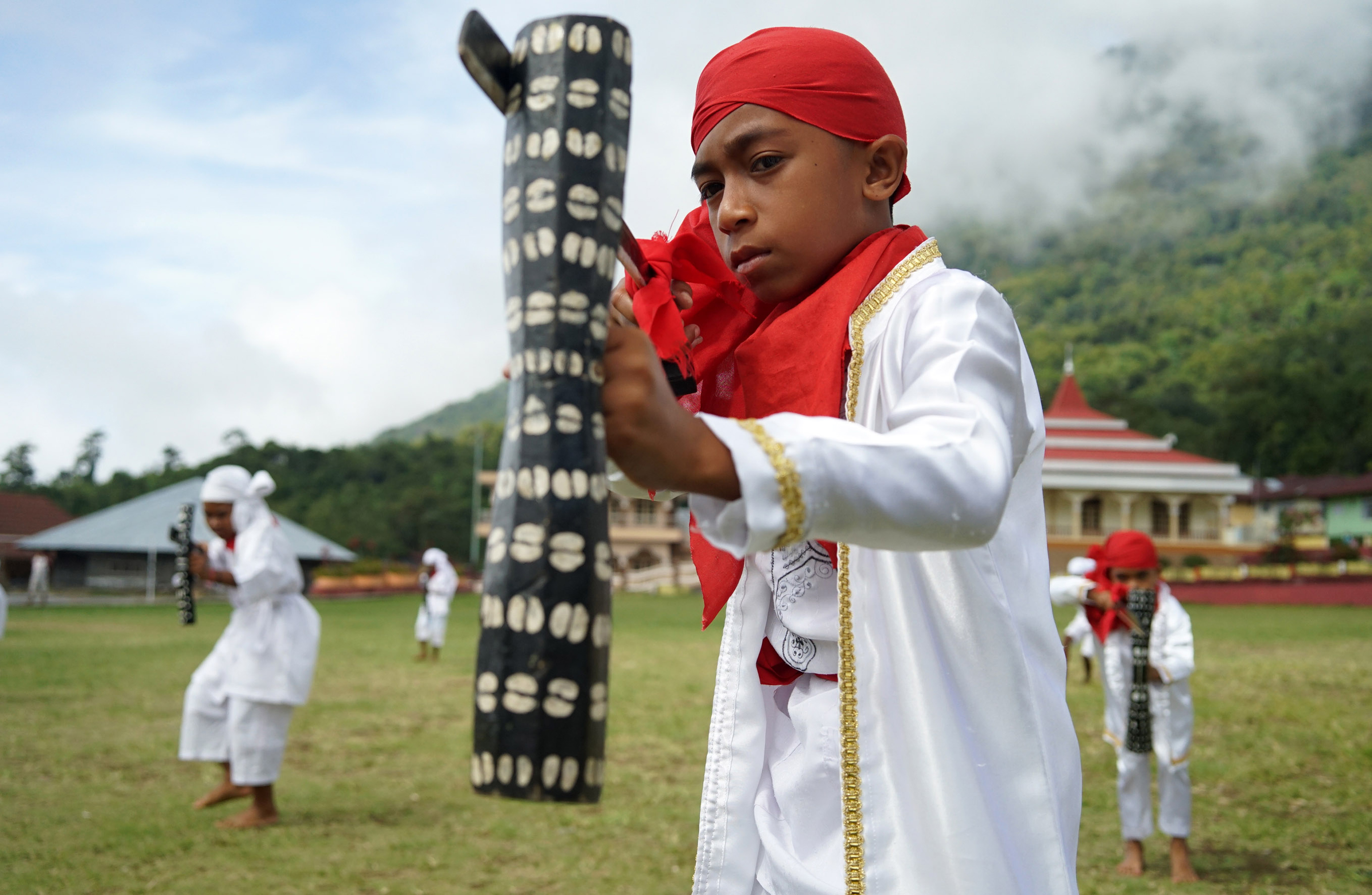
- Regent of Tidore (left) and Sultan Ahmad Fathuddin II (1867) Kapita dance

Total population
- 53,000

Regions with significant populations
- Indonesia (North Maluku)

Languages
- Tidore

Religion
- Islam

Related ethnic groups
- Ternate • Mare • Makian

The Tidore people are a major Moluccans ethnic group living in North Maluku province of Indonesia. They primarily live in Tidore island and also in some parts of Halmahera. They speak a Papuan language called Tidore. The Tidore people are predominantly Sunni Muslim and famous as the founders of the Tidore Sultanate, a major Moluccan Muslim state.
