= Kie Matubu =

Indonesian volcano

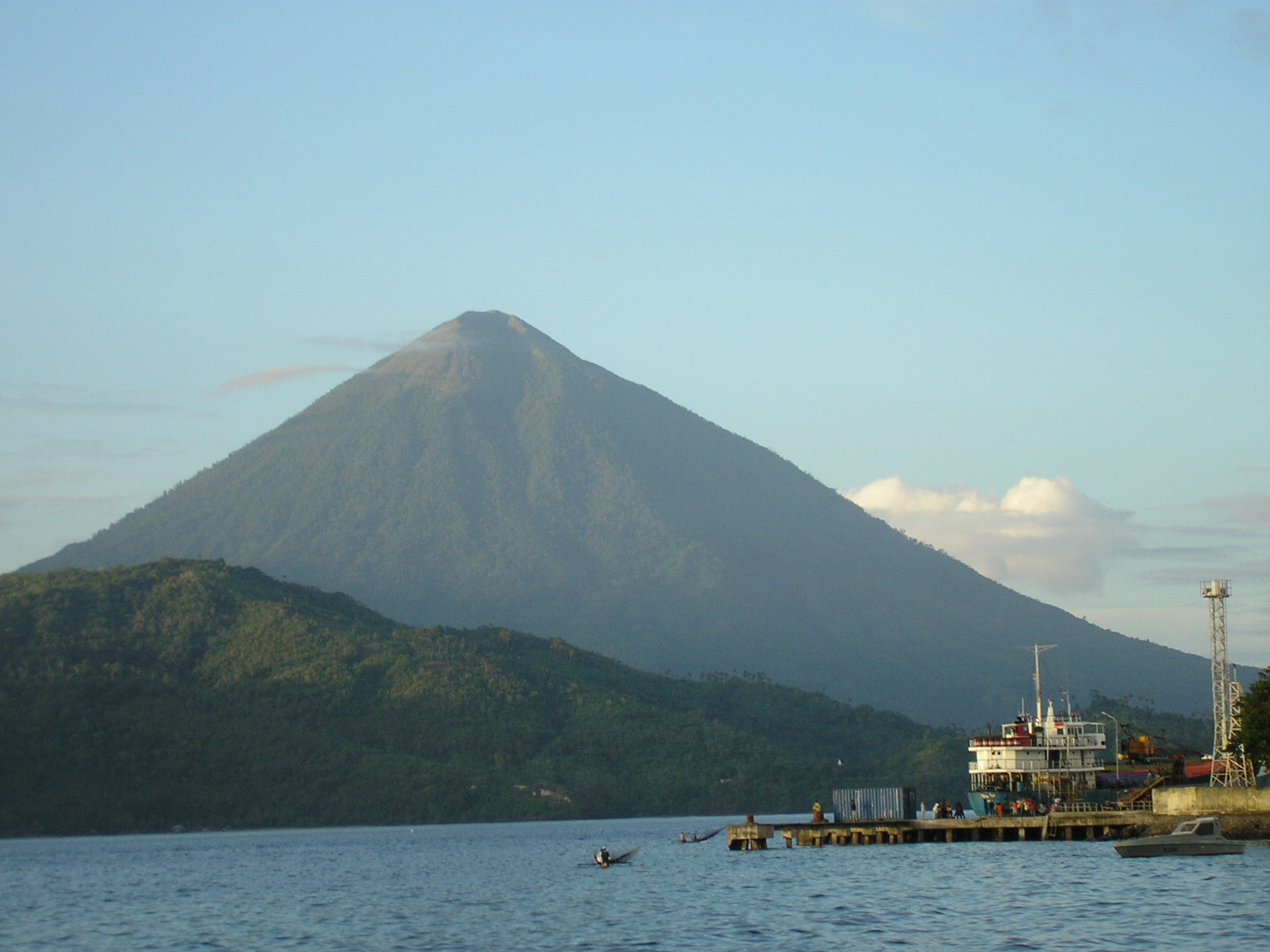

Highest point
- Elevation: 1,730 m (5,680 ft)
- Coordinates: 0.6623°S 127.4029°E

Geography
- Location: Tidore Island, Indonesia

Geology
- Mountain type: Stratovolcano
- Last eruption: 1210

Kie Matubu is a volcano on Tidore Island, Indonesia. While no eruptions have been recorded since the island was first inhabited during the 16th century, two eruption deposits were dated to around 2,500 and 740 years BP.
