= Mount Tigalalu =

Mountain in Indonesia

Highest point
- Elevation: 422 m (1,385 ft)
- Coordinates: 0.07°N 127.42°E

Geography
- Location: Halmahera, Indonesia

Geology
- Mountain type: Stratovolcano
- Last eruption: Unknown

Mount Tigalalu is an Indonesian stratovolcano located to the west of Halmahera island, at the northwestern end of Kayoa Island. Part of the volcano is flanked by coral limestones.

== See also ==
- List of volcanoes in Indonesia
