= West Makian language =

Papuan language spoken in Indonesia

West Makian
- Jitine, Moi
- Native to: Indonesia
- Region: Western part of Makian island and much of Kayoa.
- Ethnicity: Makian people (Jitine)
- Native speakers: (12,000 cited 1977)
- Language family: West Papuan?: North Halmahera; West Makian

Language codes
- ISO 639-3: mqs
- Glottolog: west2600
- ELP: Moi (Maluku, Indonesia)
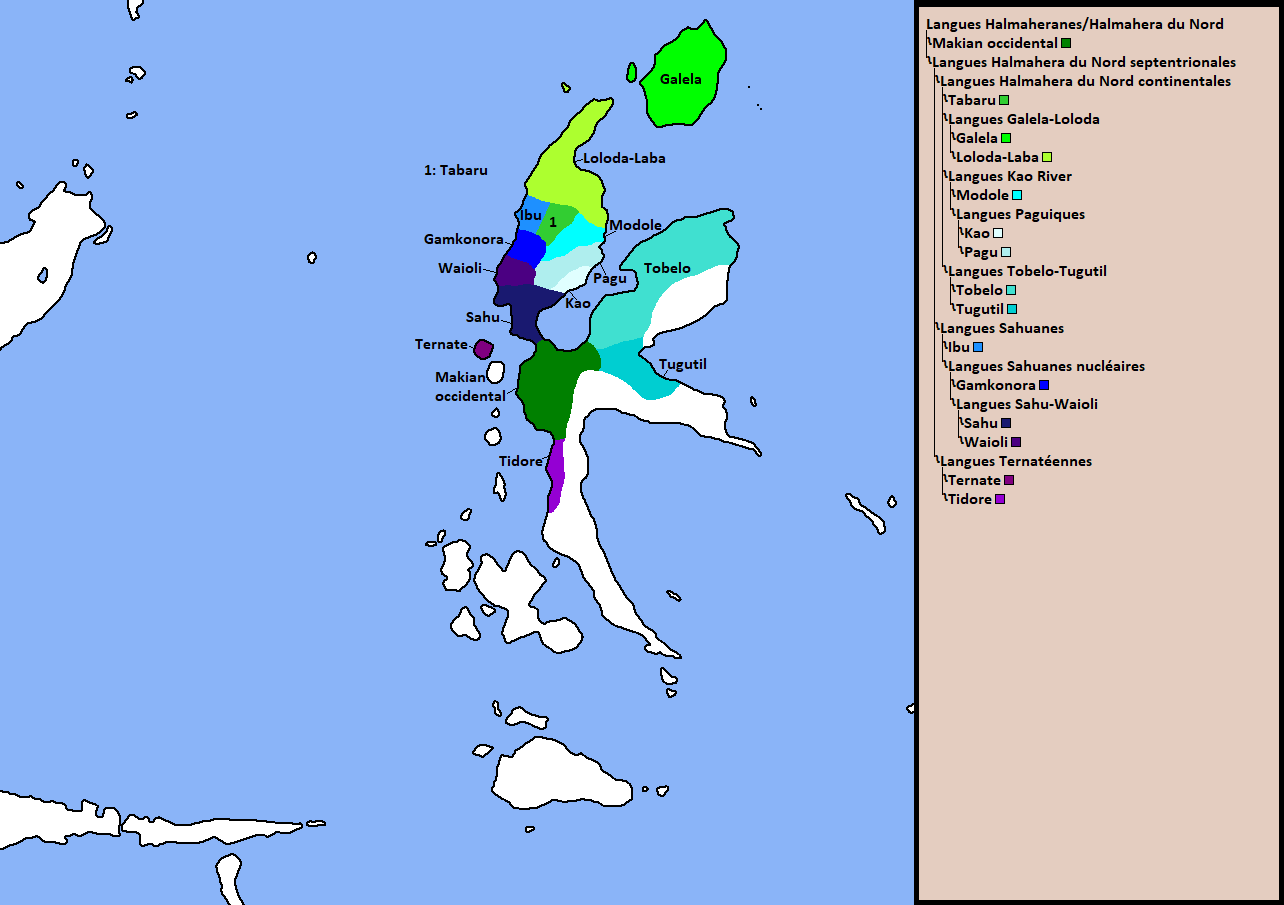
- Map of the North Halmahera languages (including West Makian)

West Makian (also known by the endonym Jitine or Moi) is a divergent North Halmahera language of Indonesia. It is spoken on the coast near Makian Island, and on the western half of that island.

West Makian has been strongly influenced by a neighboring Austronesian language or languages to the extent that it was once classified as Austronesian, as East Makian (Taba) still is. As a family-level isolate, it is not closely related to any other language. A brief description of the language can be found in Voorhoeve (1982). Much influence comes from Taba, as well as Malay, Ternate, Dutch, and potentially Portuguese.

== Phonology ==
=== Vowels ===
West Makian has 5 or 6 vowels: /a, e, ə, i, o/, and /u/, with /ə/ not recorded by Watuseke. Voorhoeve states that /ə/ is only found in Indonesian loans.

	Front	Central	Back
Close	i		u
Mid	e	ə	o
Open		a	

=== Consonants ===
		Bilabial	Dental	Palatal	Velar	Glottal
Nasal		m	n̪	(ɲ)	ŋ	
Plosive	voiceless	p	t̪	c	k	
Plosive	voiced	b	d̪	ɟ	g	
Fricative		ɸ				h
Approximant			l̪			
Trill			r̪			

/ɲ/ is found almost exclusively in Indonesian loanwords. The only original Moi word with /ɲ/ is /miɲe/ - 'one.'

Consonant clusters are found almost entirely in the middle of words, with a few occurring word-initially during continuous speech. The majority of words have stress on the penultimate syllable, with a few having it on the syllable before or the last syllable. Stress is primarily phonemic.

There are two types of sentence intonation so far observed. One involves the tone rising sharply then sometimes falling again, a pattern used in emphatic imperatives and sometimes in questions. The other pattern is a sharp drop at the end of the sentence, used for declarative sentences and non-emphatic imperatives.

=== Vowel harmony ===
West Makian makes use of regressive vowel harmony, which affects the vowels of several prefixes, the possessive marker, and a preposition. Specifically, they affect the prefixes fa-, ma-, and fala-; the verbal subject prefixes ta-, na-, ma-, fa-, and da-; the possessive marker da, and the lative, ablative, and locative preposition ta.

In general, for an element CV (consonant-vowel) the pattern is as follows:

West Makian vowel harmony
the form	precedes initial	example
Ca-	(C)a	fV- + abo = faabo fV- + dadi = fadadi
Ce-	(C)e	tV- + bebe = tebebe
Ce-	Ci	dV + pigir = de pigir
Ci-	i	tV- + i = tii
Co-	(C)o, (C)u	dV- + co = doco

However, there are many exceptions. The stative verb gei ("to be dead") takes prefixes fa- (fagei, "to kill") and ma- (magei, "to die") instead of the expected fe- and me-. The directional verbs (naso "to go to", no "to come", etc.) and the verb am ("to eat") take only verbal prefixes of the form Ci (tiam "I eat", minaso "we go to", etc.). Stative verbs are identical to directionals in terms of verbal prefixes, with the exception of the 3rd person singular, which is i- for inanimates and ma- (no vowel harmony) for animates. Additionally, in the imperative, the 2nd singular (nV-) and 2nd plural (fV-) prefixes simply assimilate to the next vowel: the verb uba ("carry") produces nuuba ("you carry it!"), fuuba ("you all carry it!").

== Bibliography ==
- Gary Holton, Marian Klamer (2018), "The Papuan languages of East Nusantara and the Bird's Head", in Bill Palmer (ed.), The Languages and Linguistics of the New Guinea Area: A Comprehensive Guide, The World of Linguistics, vol. 4, Berlin: De Gruyter Mouton, pp. 569–640, ISBN 978-3-11-028642-7
- Gary F. Simons, Charles D. Fennig (2018). "Makian, West" (21 ed.). Dallas, Texas: SIL International. Ethnologue. Archived from the original on 2018-06-23.
