= K. Alexander Adelaar =

Dutch linguist

K. Alexander Adelaar FAHA
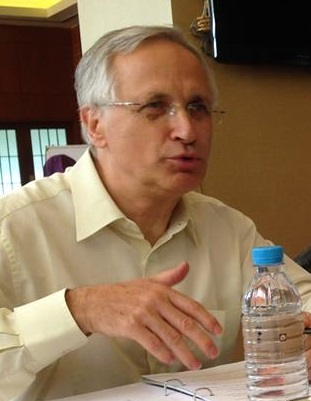
- Adelaar at Kuala Lumpur (2011)
- Born: Karl Alexander Adelaar; 1953 (age 72–73); The Hague, Netherlands
- Occupation: Linguist

Academic background
- Education: Leiden University
- Doctoral advisor: Robert Blust

Academic work
- Institutions: University of Melbourne
- Main interests: Austronesian linguistics

Karl Alexander "Sander" Adelaar FAHA (born 1953 in The Hague) is a linguist primarily interested in the Austronesian languages of Borneo, Madagascar, and Taiwan, as well as the Malayic languages. He also does research on the oral and literary traditions of Indonesia.

Adelaar is currently attached to Palacky University (Olomouc, Czech Republic) and affiliated with the University of Melbourne. He is the current managing editor of Pacific Linguistics and managing editor of Oceanic Linguistics. He has been a Fellow of the Australian Academy of the Humanities since 2008.

== Education ==
Adelaar is a graduate of Indonesian Studies at Leiden University. In 1977, he defended his MA thesis, and in 1985 he obtained a doctorate in Austronesian linguistics.
