= James T. Collins =

American linguist

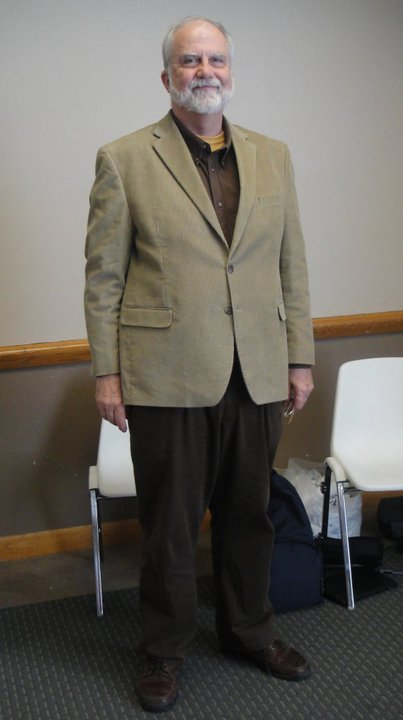
- Born: 1946 (age 79–80); Chicago, Illinois
- Occupation: Linguist

Academic background
- Education: University of Chicago

Academic work
- Institutions: Northern Illinois University
- Main interests: Austronesian languages

James T. Collins (born 1946 in Chicago) is an American linguist who works on comparative linguistics, lexicography, and sociolinguistics. Collins specializes primarily in Austronesian languages.

== Education ==
Collins received his B.A. at the University of Saint Mary of the Lake, Illinois in 1968, MA in linguistics at the University of Chicago in 1975, a Ph.D at the University of Chicago in 1980. In 1984, he was a senior researcher at Cornell University. He also taught Indonesian at the University of Texas at El Paso, Leiden University, Goethe University Frankfurt, International Institute of Asian Studies (Netherlands), and National University of Malaysia. He later became Professor of Malay-Polynesian Linguistics in 1995. He is also Professor Emeritus in Foreign Languages and Literatures at the College of Liberal Arts and Sciences, Northern Illinois University.

== Research ==
Collins did extensive research on the languages of Indonesia, especially in the regions of Maluku and Kalimantan; and that of Malaysia in the Malay Peninsula and Sarawak. Some of Collins' works include publications on the languages of Borneo (1990), Java, Bali, Sri Lanka (1995), Sumatra, and Eastern Indonesia (1996).

== Publications ==
Books

- Collins, James T (2007). Penghayatan ilmu linguistik melalui pemetaan dialek Melayu seAlam Melayu. Selangor: Penerbit Universiti Kebangsaan Malaysia. ISBN 9789679428315. OCLC 276282347.
- Collins, J.T. 2007. Asilulu-English dictionary. NUSA Volumes 51–52. Jakarta: Badan Penyelenggara Seri NUSA, Universitas Katolik Indonesia Atma Jaya
- Collins, J.T. 2007. Sejarah bahasa Melayu: Sulawesi Tengah, 1793–1795. Makassar: Badan Penerbit UNM Makassar.
- Collins, J.T. 2005. Bahasa Melayu, bahasa Dunia: Sejarah Singkat. Jakarta: KITLV-Jakarta dan Yayasan Obor Indonesia.
- Collins, J.T. 2003. Mukadimah ilmu etimologi. [An introduction to etymology.] Second edition. Kuala Lumpur: Dewan Bahasa dan Pustaka.
- Collins, J.T. 2002. Wibawa bahasa: Kepelbagaian dan kepiawaian. [Language authority: Diversity and standardization.] (First edition, second printing.) Kuala Lumpur: Dewan Bahasa dan Pustaka.
- Collins, J.T. 2001. Mukadimah ilmu etimologi. [An introduction to etymology.] Kuala Lumpur: Dewan Bahasa dan Pustaka.
- Collins, J.T. 2001. Six Bidayuhic variants of the Sekadau River. (With Chong, Shin.) Borneo Homeland Data Paper No. 3. Bangi: Institut Alam dan Tamadun Melayu Universiti Kebangsaan Malaysia.
- Collins, J.T. 2000. Malay, world language: A short history. (Second printing, second edition). Kuala Lumpur: Dewan Bahasa dan Pustaka.

Book chapters

- Collins, James T (2008). Creese, Angela; Martin, Peter W (eds.). The Ecology of Language. Encyclopedia of language and education. Vol. 9. Springer. OCLC 232957312.
- Encyclopedia of Language and Education, pp. 159–168. General Editor Nancy Hornbeger. Dordrecht: Springer Academic Publishers.
- Collins, J.T. 2006. Homelands and the homeland of Malay, In Borneo and the homeland of the Malays: Four essays, edited by James T. Collins and Awang Sariyan, pp. 1–44. Kuala Lumpur: Dewan Bahasa dan Pustaka. ISBN 9836287256
- Collins, J.T. 2004. Contesting Straits-Malayness: The fact of Borneo. In Contesting Malayness: Malay identity across boundaries, edited by Timothy P. Barnard, pp. 168–180. Singapore: Singapore University Press.
- Collins, J.T. 2002. The study of Sarawak Malay in context. In Between worlds: Linguistic papers in memory of David John Prentice, edited by K.A. Adelaar and R. Blust, pp. 65–75. Canberra: Pacific Linguistics. Research School of Pacific and Asian Studies. The Australian National University.
- Collins, J.T. 2000. Negeri dan bahasa: Sempadan politik, sempadan linguistik. In Di sekitar konsep negeri, edited by Daniel Perret, pp. 75–97. Kuala Lumpur: Kementerian Kebudayaan, Kesenian dan Pelancongan Malaysia, École française d’ Extrême-Orient, Institut Alam dan Tamadun Melayu, Universiti Kebangsaan Malaysia.

Journal articles

- Collins, James T (2006). "Linguistik sejarawi dan Alam Melayu". Jurnal Melayu. 2: 55–73.
- Collins, J.T. 2004. Ibanic languages in Kalimantan Barat, Indonesia: Exploring nomenclature, distribution and characteristics. Borneo Research Bulletin 35:17-47.
- Collins, J.T. 2004. Language communities in the Sekadau River basin, Kalimantan Barat: Three viewpoints. Suomen Antropologi 29:2-21.
- Collins, J.T. 2004. Language use and language change in Manjau, Kalimantan Barat: Exploring the Tola’ Dayak language and society. (With Sujarni Alloy.) Bijdragen tot de Taal-, Land- en Volkenkunde 160:227-284.
- Collins, J.T. 2004. A book and a chapter in the history of Malay: Brouwerius’ Genesis (1697) and Ambonese Malay. Archipel 67:77-128.
- Collins, J.T. 2003. Language death in Maluku: The impact of the VOC. Bijdragen tot de Taal-, Land- en Volkenkunde 159:247-289.
- Collins, J.T. 2001. Contesting Straits-Malayness: The fact of Borneo. Journal of Southeast Asian Studies 32(3):385-395.
