= Tidore =

City in North Maluku , Indonesia

- City
- City of Tidore Islands; Kota Tidore Kepulauan
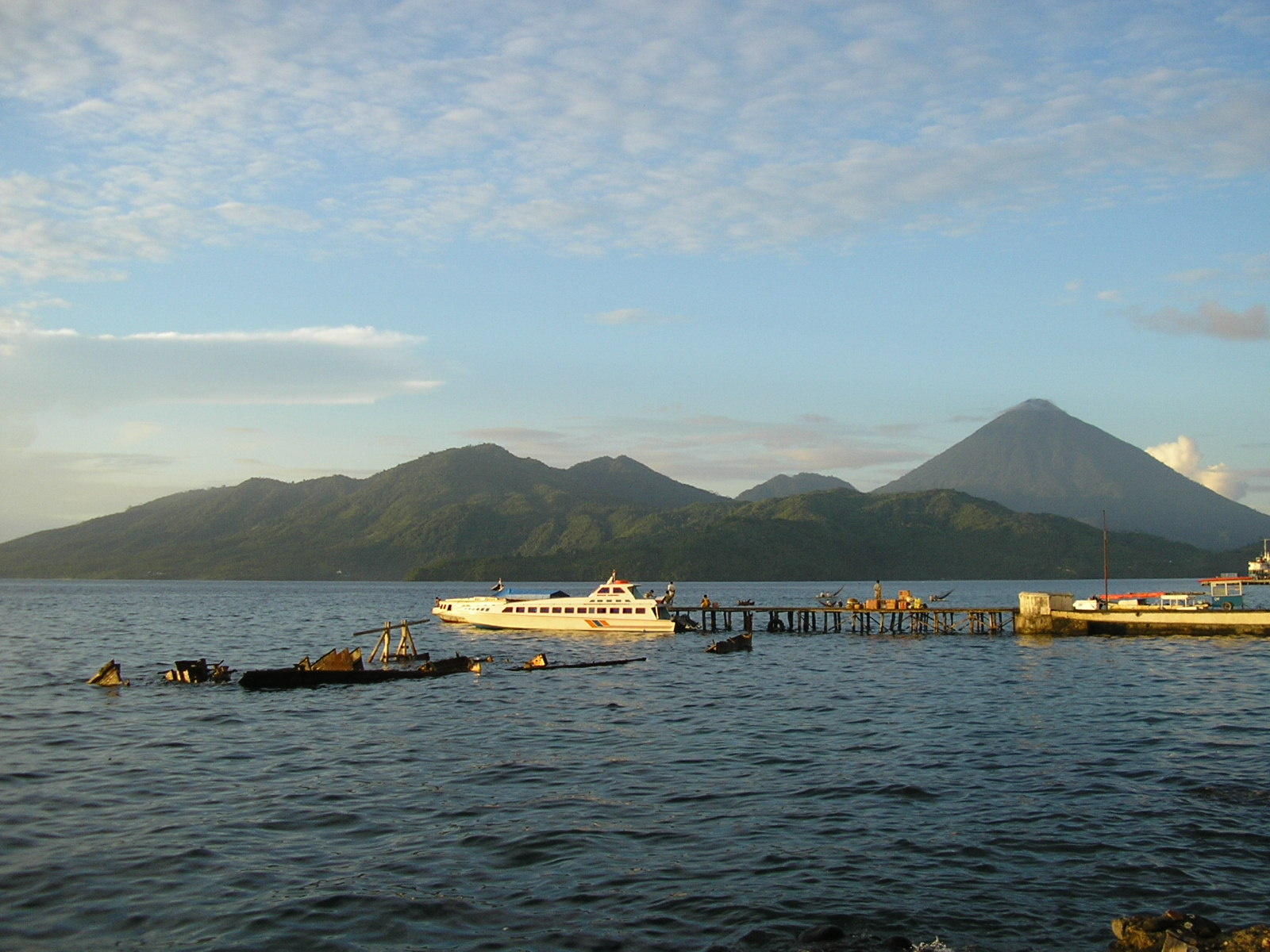
- Tidore Island, as seen from Ternate Island.

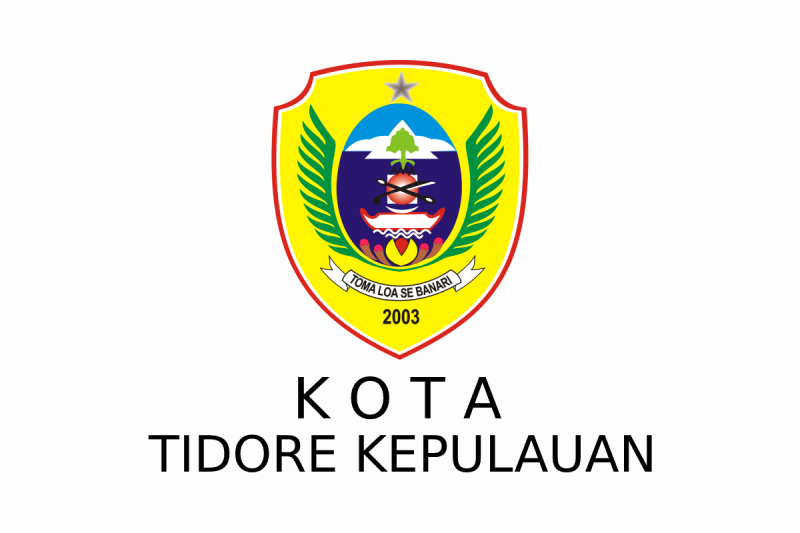
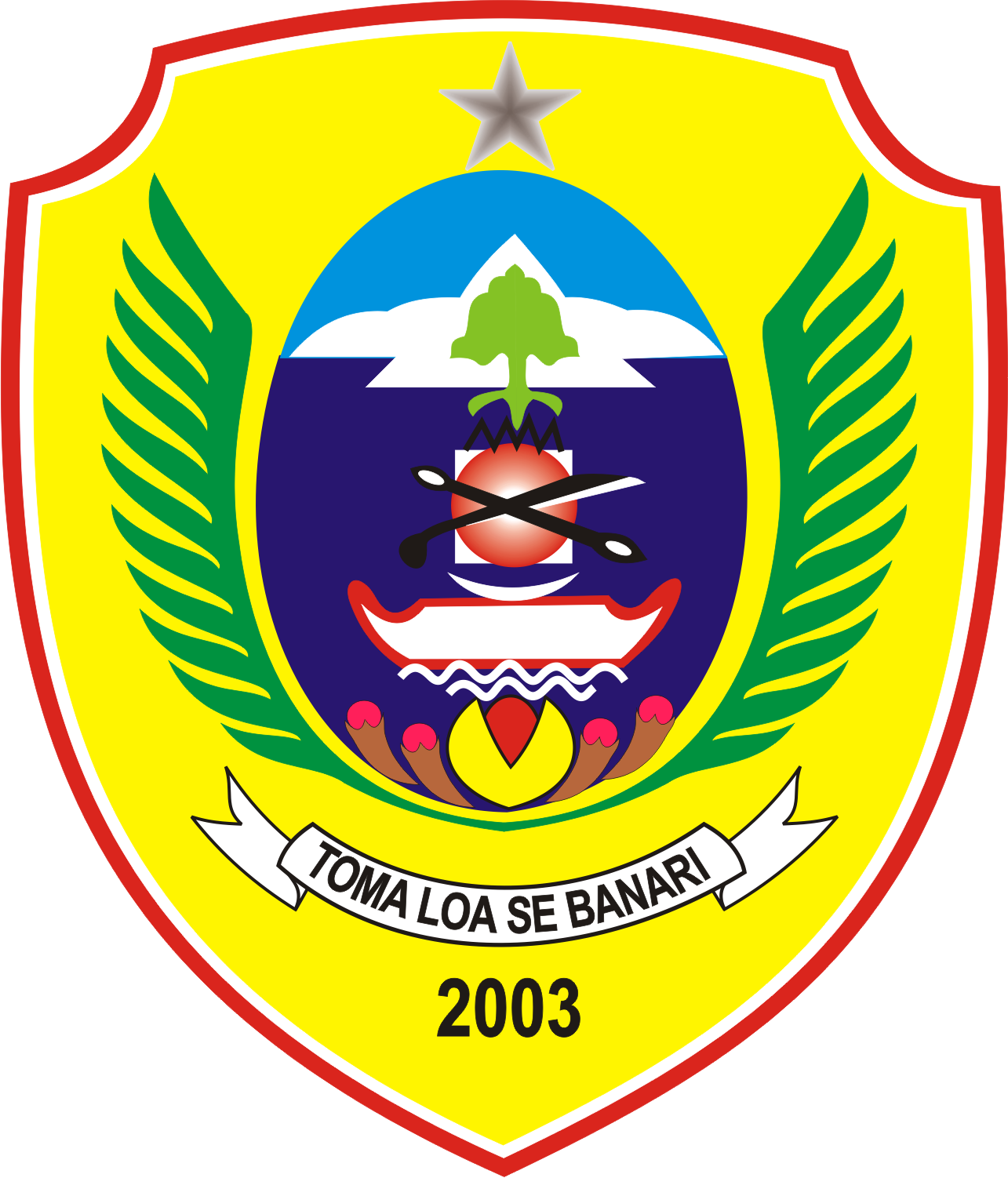
- Flag Coat of arms
- Motto: Toma Loa Se Banari (Ternate) "The Conscience of the People"
- Location within Maluku Islands
- Interactive map of Tidore
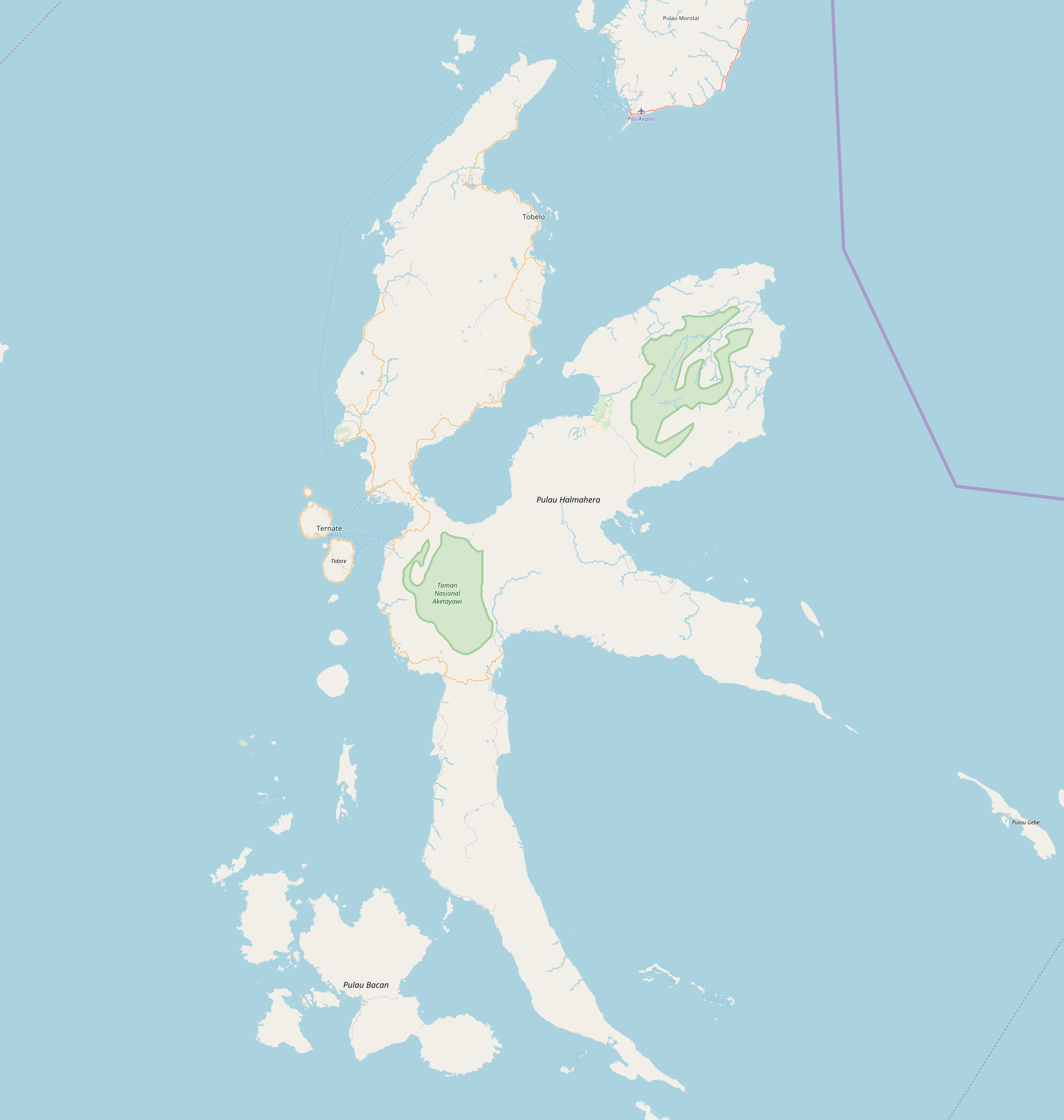
- Location in Halmahera and Indonesia Tidore (Indonesia)
- Coordinates: 0°41′N 127°24′E
- Country: Indonesia
- Province: North Maluku

Government
  - Mayor: Muhammad Senin
  - Vice Mayor: Ahmad Laiman

Area
  - City: 1,703.32 km^{2} (657.66 sq mi)
  - Urban: 126.18 km^{2} (48.72 sq mi)

Population (mid 2024 estimate)
  - City: 121,952
  - Density: 71.5966/km^{2} (185.434/sq mi)
  - Urban: 66,885
  - Urban density: 530.08/km^{2} (1,372.9/sq mi)
- Time zone: UTC+9 (Indonesia Eastern Time)
- Postcodes: 978xx
- Area code: (+62) 921
- Vehicle registration: DG
- Website: tidorekota.go.id

Tidore (Indonesian: Kota Tidore Kepulauan, lit. 'City of Tidore Islands') is a city, island, and archipelago in the Maluku Islands of eastern Indonesia, west of the larger island of Halmahera. Part of North Maluku Province, the city includes the island of Tidore (with three smaller outlying islands - Mare, Maitara and Filonga) together with a large part of Halmahera Island to its east. In the pre-colonial era, the Sultanate of Tidore was a major regional political and economic power, and a fierce rival of nearby Ternate, just to the north. Included within the city is the provincial capital, Sofifi, which is situated on the mainland of Halmahera (in North Oba District).

== Geography ==
Tidore Island consists of a large stratovolcano which rises from the seafloor to an elevation of 1,730 m (5,676 ft) above sea level at the conical Kie Matubu on the south end of the island. The northern side of the island contains a caldera, Sabale, with two smaller volcanic cones within it.

Immediately to the south of Tidore Island lies a string of three smaller islands, each being the summit of a separate stratovolcano. From north to south these islands are Mare (part of Tidore Islands City), Moti (administratively a district of Ternate city) and Makian (administratively forming two districts within South Halmahera Regency).

Soasio is Tidore's capital. It has its own port, Goto, and it lies on the eastern edge of the island. It has a mini bus terminal and a market. The sultan's palace was rebuilt with completion in 2010.

== History ==
Tidore was the center of a spice-funded sultanate that arose in the 15th century. It spent much of its history in the shadow of Ternate, another sultanate with which it had a dualistic relationship.

Islam spread to Tidore around the late 15th century but Islamic influence in the area can be traced further back to the late 14th century.

The sultans of Tidore ruled most of southern Halmahera, and, at times, controlled Buru, East Ceram and many of the islands off the coast of New Guinea. Tidore established an alliance with the Spanish in the sixteenth century, and Spain had several forts on the island. There was mutual distrust between the Tidorese and the Spanish but for the Tidorese the Spanish presence was helpful in resisting the incursions of the Ternateans and their ally the Dutch, who had a fort on Ternate. For the Spanish, backing the Tidore state helped check the expansion of Dutch power that threatened their nearby Asia-Pacific interests, provided a useful base right next to the centre of Dutch power in the region and was a source of spices for trade.

Although nominally part of the Spanish East Indies in the later sixteenth century and well into the seventeenth century, the Tidore sultanate established itself as one of the strongest and most independent states in the region. After the Spanish left in 1663, it continued to resist direct control by the Dutch East India Company (the VOC). Particularly under Sultan Saifuddin (r. 1657–1687), the Tidore court was skilled at using Dutch payment for spices for gifts to strengthen traditional ties with Tidore's traditional peripheral territories. As a result, he was widely respected by many local populations, and had little need to call on foreign military help for governing the kingdom, unlike Ternate which frequently relied upon Dutch military assistance.

Tidore long remained an independent state, albeit with growing Dutch interference, until the late eighteenth century. Like Ternate, Tidore allowed the Dutch spice eradication program (extirpatie) to proceed in its territories. This program, intended to strengthen the Dutch spice monopoly by limiting production to a few places, impoverished Tidore and weakened its control over its periphery.

In 1780 Tidore was forced to sign a treaty that reduced it to a Dutch vassal. The discontented Prince Nuku left Tidore and declared himself Sultan of the Papuan Islands. This was the beginning of a guerilla war which lasted for many years. The Papuans, south-east Halmaherans and east Ceramese sided with the rebellious Prince Nuku. The British sponsored Nuku as part of their campaign against the Dutch in the Moluccas. Captain Thomas Forrest was intimately connected with Nuku and represented the British as ambassador. Nuku could finally take Tidore in 1797 and helped the British to conquer Ternate in 1801. However, his successor Zainal Abidin was expelled by Dutch forces in 1806 and Tidore was firmly brought under colonial rule.

The sultanate was abolished in the Sukarno era and re-established in 1999 with the 36th sultan. Tidore was largely spared from the sectarian conflict of 1999 across the Maluku Islands.

== Administration ==
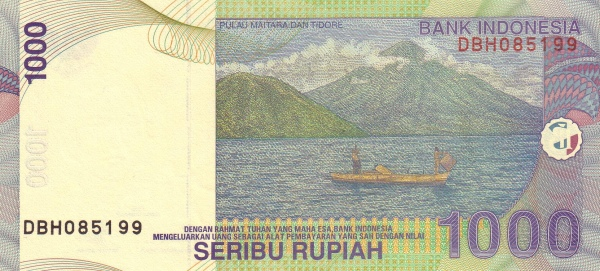
Tidore Island featured on the Indonesian 1,000-rupiah banknote

The island, together with three smaller islands (Mare, Maitara and Filonga) and an adjacent much larger section (called "Oba") of Halmahera Island, constitutes a municipality (kotamadya) within the province of North Maluku. It is officially called the "Tidore Islands City" because it includes four islands (the main island of Tidore, plus the three nearby smaller islands of Mare, Maitara and Filonga) as well as the Oba area on mainland Halmahera (also including minor offshore islands). The whole municipality covers an area of 1,703.32 square kilometres (657.66 sq mi) and had a 2010 Census population of 90,530; the 2020 Census produced a total of 115,305 and the official estimate as at mid 2024 was 121,952 (comprising 62,631 males and 59,321 females).

It is divided into eight districts (kecamatan), of which four constitute the island of Tidore (including the three small islands) and the other four constitute the Oba area on the 'mainland' of Halmahera. These are tabulated below with their areas (in sq km) and their populations at the 2010 Census and the 2020 Census, together with the official estimates as at mid 2024. The table also includes the locations of the district administrative centres, the number of administrative villages in each district (totaling 49 rural desa and 40 urban kelurahan), and its post code.

Kode Wilayah	Name of District (kecamatan)	English name	Area in km^{2}	Pop'n Census 2010	Pop'n Census 2020	Pop'n Estimate mid 2024	Admin centre	No. of kelurahan	No. of desa	Post code
82.72.04	Tidore Selatan ^{(a)}	South Tidore	26.76	13,129	14,958	15,420	Gurabati	6	2 ^{(b)}	97821
82.72.05	Tidore Utara ^{(c)}	North Tidore	46.27	14,573	17,495	18,298	Rum	10	4 ^{(d)}	97823
82.72.01	Tidore ^{(e)}	(Tidore town, or Soasio)	23.20	18,477	23,010	23,086	Tomagoba	13	-	97811 -97813
82.72.08	Tidore Timur	East Tidore	29.95	7,657	9,603	10,081	Tosa	7	-	97822
	(totals on Tidore Island)		126.18	53,836	65,066	66,885		36	6	
82.72.03	Oba	Oba	374.36	10,337	13,970	14,899	Payahe	1 ^{(f)}	12	97824
82.72.07	Oba Selatan	South Oba	225.25	4,892	6,937	6,939	Lifofa	-	7	97825
82.72.02	Oba Utara ^{(g)}	North Oba	325.31	13,331	19,193	22,368	Sofifi	2 ^{(h)}	11	97827
82.72.06	Oba Tengah	Central Oba	652.22	7,659	10,139	10,861	Akelamo	1 ^{(i)}	13	97826
	(totals on Halmahera Island)		1,577.14	36,219	50,239	55,067		4	43	

Notes: (a) including Mare Island (with an area of 6.09 km^{2} and a population of 968 in mid 2023), which is another stratovolcano island to the south of Tidore. (b) the two villages of Mare Island (Mare Gam and Mare Kofo).
(c) including Maitara island, to the northwest of Tidore (and between Tidore and Ternate), with an area of 2.74 km^{2} and 2,272 inhabitants in mid 2023.
(d) the four villages on Maitara Island (Maitara, Maitara Selatan, Maitara Tengah and Maitara Utara). (e) including Filonga Island to the northeast of Tidore Island.
(f) Payahe kelurahan. (g) including the town of Sofifi, which since 2010 has been the provincial capital of North Maluku. (h) Sofifi and Guraping kelurahan. (i) Akelamo kelurahan.
