= Makian =

Island in North Maluku, Indonesia

Coordinates: 00°20′N 127°22′E

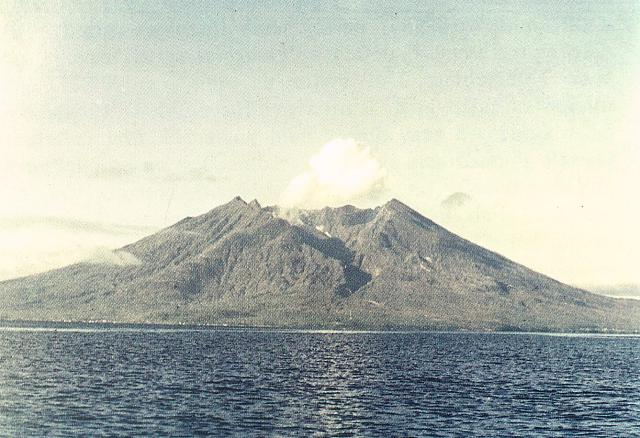

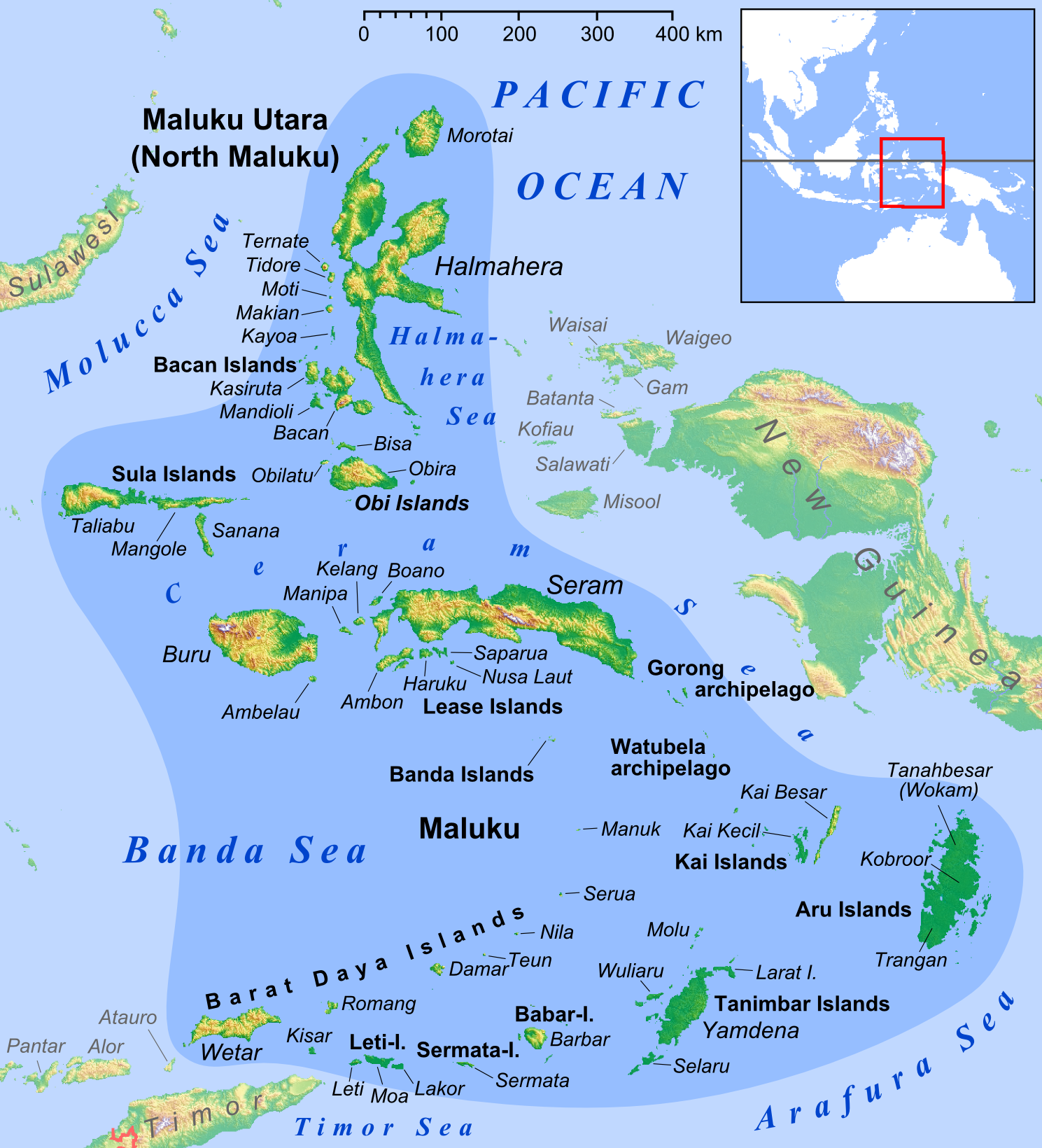

Geography
- Location: Southeast Asia
- Archipelago: Maluku Islands
- Area: 91.04 km^{2} (35.15 sq mi)
- Highest elevation: 1,357 m (4452 ft)

Administration
- Indonesia
- Province: North Maluku

Demographics
- Population: 12,404 (mid 2024 estimate)
- Pop. density: 136.2/km^{2} (352.8/sq mi)
- Ethnic groups: Makian

Additional information
- Time zone: EIT (UTC+09:00)

Makian (also Machian or Makeang), known to local people as Mount Kie Besi, is a volcanic island, one of the Maluku Islands within the province of North Maluku in Indonesia. It lies near the southern end of a chain of volcanic islands off the western coast of the province's major island, Halmahera, and lies between the islands of Moti and Tidore to the north and Kayoa and the Bacan Group to the south. The island, which forms two districts (Pulau Makian and Makian Barat) within South Halmahera Regency of North Maluku Province, covers an area of 91.04 sq.km, and had a population of 12,394 at the 2010 Census, which rose to 14,000 at the 2020 Census. The official estimate as at mid 2024 was 12,404.

The roughly circular island is 10 kilometres (6 miles) wide, and rises to a 1,357-metre (4,452-foot) high summit which consists of a large 1.5 kilometres (1 mile) wide crater, with a small lake on its Northeast side. There are four parasitic cones on the western slopes of Makian. Makian volcano is also known as Mount Kiebesi (or Kie Besi).

== Administrative Divisions ==
Makian Island District (Kecamatan Pulau Makian) occupies the eastern 61% of the island and consists of 15 villages (desa), while West Makian District (Kecamatan Makian Barat) covers 7 villages.

Kode Wilayah	Name of Village (desa)	Area in km^{2}	Pop'n Estimate mid 2024
82.04.01.2001	Rabutdaio	3.9	700
82.04.01.2002	Kota (Waykion)	2.5	326
82.04.01.2003	Gorup	1.5	306
82.04.01.2004	Walo	1.4	242
82.04.01.2005	Dalam	1.3	394
82.04.01.2006	Gitang	1.9	509
82.04.01.2007	Kyowor	2.1	521
82.04.01.2008	Matentengin	3.2	649
82.04.01.2009	Sangapati	6.4	997
82.04.01.2010	Samsuma	5.4	993
82.04.01.2011	Ploili	2.1	601
82.04.01.2012	Dauri	5.8	767
82.04.01.2013	Gurua	5.5	704
82.04.01.2014	Wailoa	4.7	412
82.04.01.2022	Waigitang	7.8	657
Sub-totals	Pulau Makian; District	55.5	8,778
82.04.10.2001	Malapat	7.2	685
82.04.10.2002	Bobawae	6.6	557
82.04.10.2003	Ombawa	3.2	183
82.04.10.2004	Tegono	2.4	260
82.04.10.2005	Mateketen	3.8	525
82.04.10.2006	Talapao	7.2	613
82.04.10.2007	Sebelei	5.1	803
Sub-totals	Makian Barat; District	35.5	3,626
Totals	Makian island	91.0	12,404

== Volcanic history ==
Makian volcano has had infrequent, but violent eruptions that destroyed villages on the island.

Its first recorded eruption was in the 1550s. The eruptions of July 19, 1646, September 22, 1760 and December 28, 1861 are rated 4 on the Volcanic Explosivity Index. Since the first known eruption in the 1550s, it has erupted seven times, four of which caused fatalities.

The 1760 eruption of the volcano killed about three thousand inhabitants. It erupted in 1890, and was then dormant until July 1988, when a series of eruptions forced the temporary evacuation of the island's entire population, then about fifteen thousand people.

== Languages ==
There are two quite unrelated languages spoken in this island, Taba in the east and West Makian in the west. Taba or East Makian belongs to the Austronesian language family, while West Makian belongs to the West Papuan language family. Both are spoken by an ethnic group called the Makian people, whose speakers are divided into two sub-groups, Tabayana (East Makian) and Jitine (West Makian).

== See also ==
- List of volcanoes in Indonesia
