= Ternate language =

Language in North Maluku

Ternate
- ترناتي
- Native to: Indonesia
- Region: Ternate (North Maluku)
- Ethnicity: Ternate
- Native speakers: (42,000 cited 1981); 20,000 L2 speakers (1981)
- Language family: West Papuan?: North Halmahera; Ternate–Tidore; Ternate
- Writing system: Latin script (Rumi); Historically Arabic script (Jawi)

Language codes
- ISO 639-3: tft
- Glottolog: tern1247
- ELP: Ternate
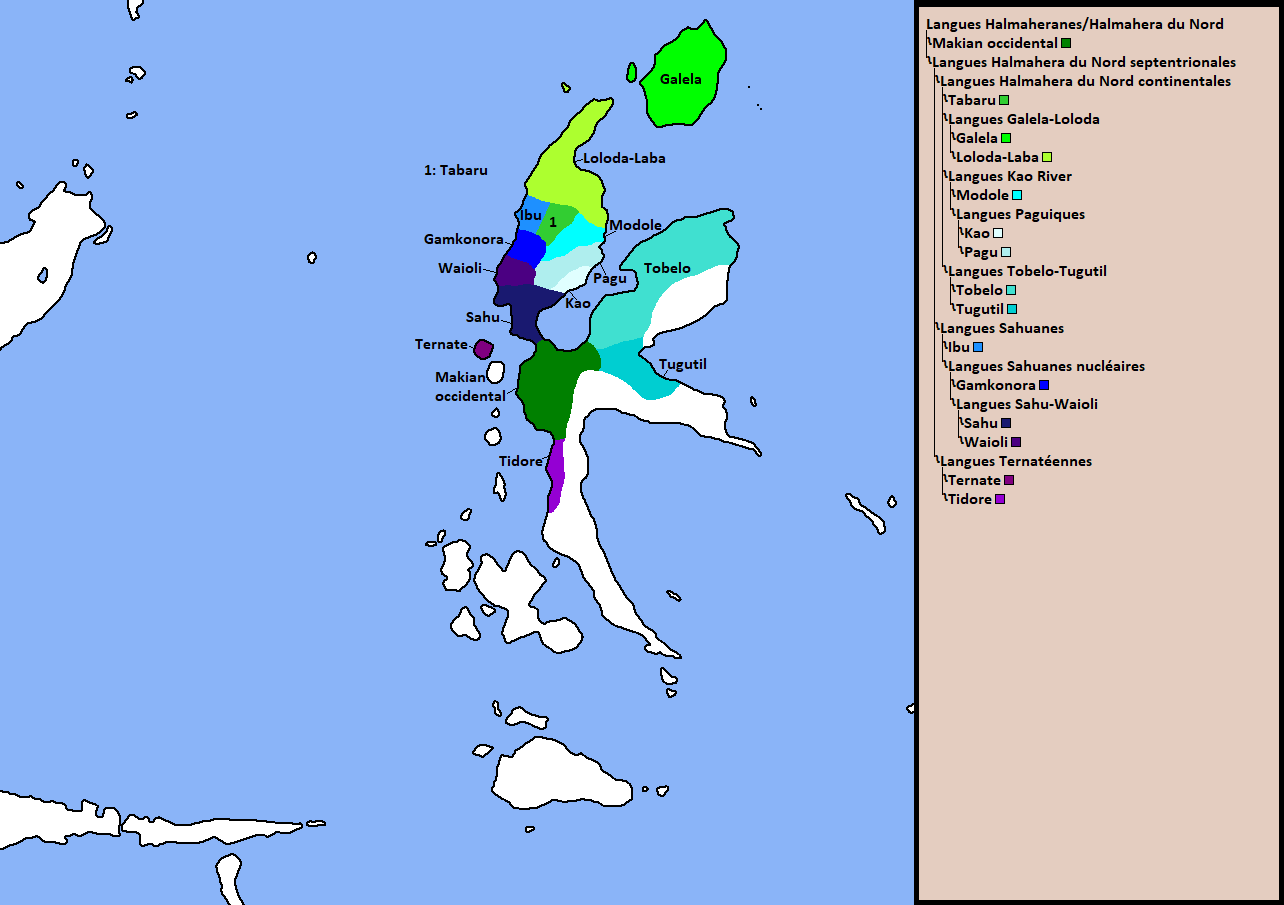
- Map of the North Halmahera languages (including Ternate)

- Location in Southeast Asia
- Coordinates: 0°1′N 127°44′E

Ternate is a language of northern Maluku, eastern Indonesia. It is spoken by the Ternate people, who inhabit the island of Ternate, as well as many other areas of the archipelago. It is the dominant indigenous language of North Maluku, historically important as a regional lingua franca. A North Halmahera language, it is unlike most languages of Indonesia which belong to the Austronesian language family.

Due to the historical role of the Ternate Sultanate, Ternate influence is present in many languages of eastern Indonesia. Borrowings from Ternate extend beyond the Maluku Islands, reaching the regions of central and northern Sulawesi. Languages such as Taba and West Makian have borrowed much of their polite lexicons from Ternate, while the languages of northern Sulawesi have incorporated many Ternate vocabulary items related to kingship and administration. The language has been a source of lexical and grammatical borrowing for North Moluccan Malay, the local variant of Malay, which has given rise to other eastern Indonesian offshoots of Malay, such as Manado Malay.

Ternate has loanwords from Malay, Portuguese, Dutch, English, and Javanese.

== Location and use ==
It is geographically widespread. It is spoken on the island of Ternate as well as elsewhere in the North Maluku province, with Ternate communities inhabiting the western coast of Halmahera, Hiri, Obi, Kayoa, and the Bacan Islands. Historically, Ternate served as the primary language of the Sultanate of Ternate, famous for its role in the spice trade. It has established itself as a lingua franca of the North Maluku region.

This language should be distinguished from Ternate Malay (North Moluccan Malay), a local Malay-based creole which it has heavily influenced. Ternate serves as the first language of ethnic Ternateans, mainly in the rural areas, while Ternate Malay is nowadays used as a means of interethnic and trade communication, particularly in the urban part of the island. More recently, there has been a language shift from Ternate towards Malay. It can be assumed that the role of Ternate as a lingua franca has greatly waned. While the Ternate people are scattered all over eastern Indonesia, it is not known how many expatriate Ternateans still speak the language.

In Indonesian, it is generally known as bahasa Ternate; however, the term bahasa Ternate asli is sometimes used to distinguish it from Ternate Malay.

== Written records ==
The Ternate language has been recorded with the Arabic script since the 15th century, while the Latin alphabet is used in modern writing. Ternate and Tidore are notable for being the only indigenous non-Austronesian languages of the region to have established literary traditions prior to first European contact. Other languages of the North Halmahera region, which were not written down until the arrival of Christian missionaries, have received significant lexical influence from Ternate.

== Classification ==
Gates with Ternate language

Ternate is a member of the North Halmahera language family, which is classified by some as part of a larger West Papuan family, a proposed linking of the North Halmahera languages with the Papuan languages of the Bird's Head Peninsula. It is most closely related to the Tidore language, which is native to the southern neighboring island. The distinction between Ternate and Tidore appears more rooted in sociopolitical rather than linguistic differences. While many authors have described these varieties as separate languages, some classifications identify them as dialects of a single language, collectively termed as either "Ternate" or "Ternate-Tidore".

== Phonology ==
Ternate, like other North Halmahera languages, is not a tonal language.

=== Consonants ===
Ternate consonant phonemes
		Labial	Alveolar	Palatal	Velar	Glottal
Nasal		m	n	ɲ	ŋ	
Plosive/Affricate	voiceless	p	t	tʃ	k	
Plosive/Affricate	voiced	b	d	dʒ	ɡ	
Fricative	voiceless	f	s			h
Approximant	median	w		j		
Approximant	lateral		l			
Flap			ɾ			

=== Vowels ===
Ternate vowel phonemes
	Front	Central	Back
High	i		u
Mid	e		o
Low		a	
