= Kayoa =

Island in Maluku, Indonesia

Native name: Pulau Urimatiti
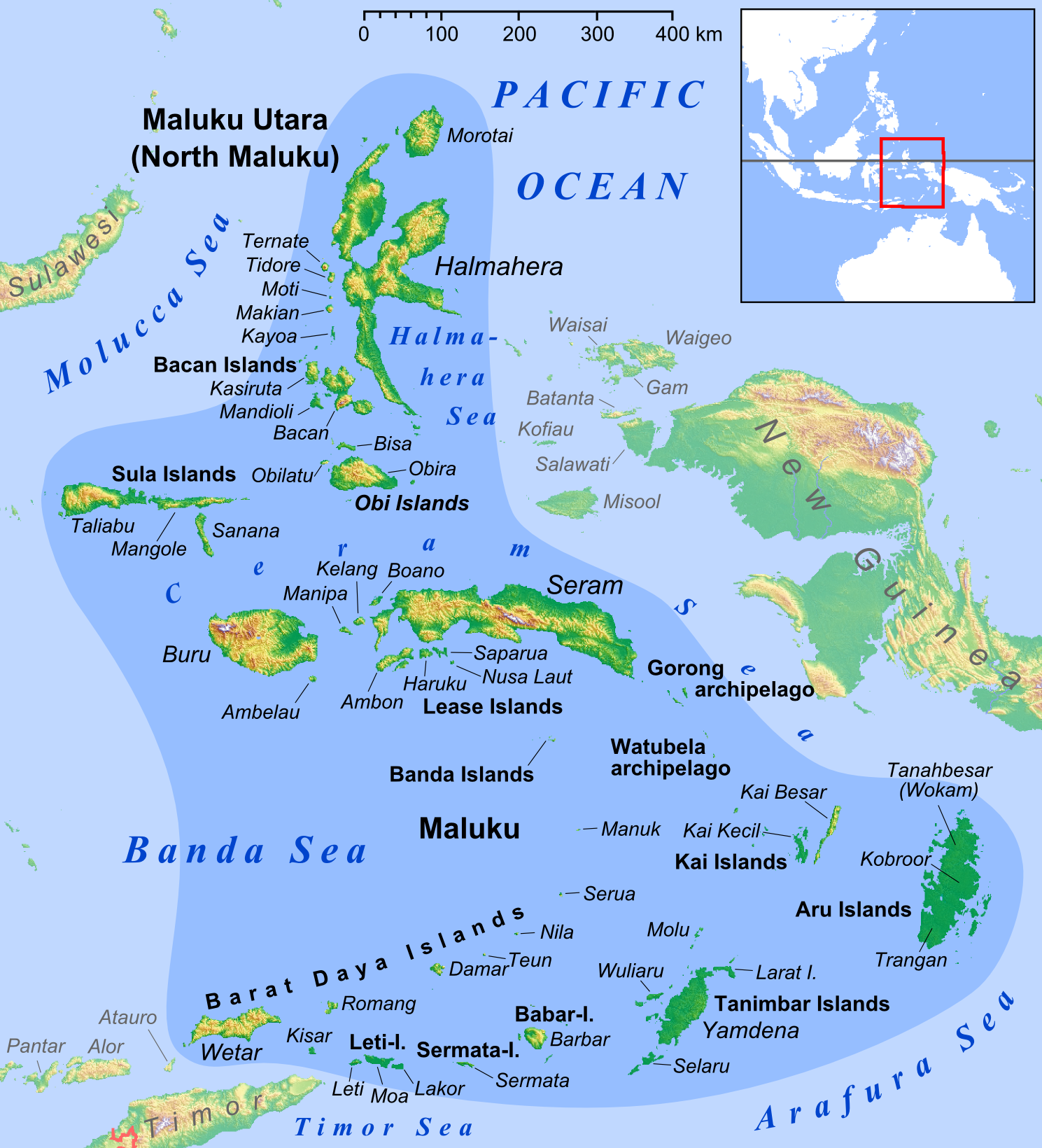

Geography
- Coordinates: 00°4′N 127°25′E
- Archipelago: Maluku Islands
- Total islands: 66
- Area: 179.97 km^{2} (69.49 sq mi)
- Highest elevation: 422 m (1385 ft)
- Highest point: Mount Tigalalu

Administration
- Indonesia
- Province: North Maluku

Demographics
- Population: 22,232 (mid 2024)
- Pop. density: 123.5/km^{2} (319.9/sq mi)

Kayoa (also Kaioa), or in the native language Pulau Urimatiti, is a group of 66 islands, part of the Maluku Islands. It is located in South Halmahera Regency, part of North Maluku Province of Indonesia.

== Geography ==
The Kayoa Islands are near the southern end of a chain of volcanic islands off the western coast of Halmaherato (Halmahera region), to the south of Makian and to the north of Bacan. The 66 islands cover a land area of 179.97 km^{2}. The main island is about 10 miles (16 km) long, about 9 miles (14.5 km) south of Makian with a line of hills along most of its length. The group forms four districts within South Halmahera Regency, and it had a total population of 20,176 at the 2010 Census and 23,111 at the 2020 Census. The official estimate for mid 2024 was 22,232.

The islands were for centuries the only place in the world where cloves were produced. Kayoa lies on the equator and is subject to regular heavy rain in the two monsoon seasons, which are December to March and June to July.

The stratovolcano Mount Tigalalu lies at the western end of Kayoa, partly flanked by coral limestones. However, Kayoa Island differs from its neighbours in being composed mainly of sedimentary rather than volcanic rock. Its western side consists of terraces of raised coral limestone with pumice and beach sand.

Name of District	English name	Area in km^{2}	Pop'n Census 2010	Pop'n Census 2020	Pop'n Estimate mid 2024	Admin centre	No. of villages	Post code
Kayoa		87.62	8,180	9,057	8,664	Guruapin	14	97780
Kayoa Barat	West Kayoa	27.07	3,469	4,336	4,121	Busua	4	97781
Kayoa Selatan	South Kayoa	26.06	5,856	6,822	6,658	Laluin	6	97780
Kayoa Utara	North Kayoa	39.22	2,671	2,896	2,789	Laromabati	6	97781

Kayoa Barat District - comprising Mauri Island (Pulau Mauri) and 4 smaller islands - is actually closer to the Bacan Islands than to Kayoa Island. The rest of the archipelago comprises a number of groups and individual islands - the largest being Pulau Kayoa and Pulau Waidoba in the east, and Pulau Taneti in the southwest, with a number of smaller islands northwards from Taneti Island - including the Gora Ici Islands, Gunange, Laigoma, Siko and Gafi.

== Villages ==
The four districts are sub-divided into thirty administrative villages (desa) as tabulated below:

Name of District	Name of Island	Kode Wilayah	Name of desa	Area in km^{2}	Pop'n Estimate mid 2024	Post code
Kayoa	Siko	82.04.02.2004	Siko	4.50	398	97780
Kayoa	Gafi	82.04.02.2005	Gafi	1.30	308	97780
Kayoa	Laigoma	82.04.02.2006	Laigoma	1.70	280	97780
Kayoa	Taneti	82.04.02.2016	Ligua	13.00	135	97780
Kayoa	Taneti	82.04.02.2017	Kida	8.20	183	97780
Kayoa	Taneti	82.04.02.2018	Buli	14.10	375	97780
Kayoa	Gora Ici Islands	82.04.02.2019	Talimau	1.70	808	97780
Kayoa	Gunange	82.04.02.2020	Gunange	1.90	498	97780
Kayoa	Gora Ici Islands	82.04.02.2021	Lelei	1.80	614	97780
Kayoa	Kayoa	82.04.02.2022	Bajo	3.10	1,753	97780
Kayoa	Kayoa	82.04.02.2023	Guruapin	26.40	2,269	97780
Kayoa	Kayoa	82.04.02.2024	Karamat	4.20	375	97780
Kayoa	Tawabi	82.04.02.2029	Tawabi	3.40	459	97780
Kayoa	Gora Ici Islands	82.04.02.2030	Dorolamo	2.30	209	97780
Kayoa Selatan	Kayoa	82.04.12.2001	Ngute-Ngute	6.60	403	97780
Kayoa Selatan	Waidoba	82.04.12.2002	Laluin	2.50	2,630	97780
Kayoa Selatan	Kayoa	82.04.12.2003	Posi-Posi	5.20	1,135	97780
Kayoa Selatan	Waidoba	82.04.12.2004	Sagawele	5.70	947	97780
Kayoa Selatan	Waidoba	82.04.12.2005	Orimakurunga	2.10	1,195	97780
Kayoa Selatan	Waidoba	82.04.12.2006	Pasir Putih	3.80	348	97780
Kayoa Utara	Kayoa	82.04.13.2001	Modayama	3.50	677	97781
Kayoa Utara	Kayoa	82.04.13.2002	Laromabati	14.00	721	97781
Kayoa Utara	Kayoa	82.04.13.2003	Gayap	10.20	475	97781
Kayoa Utara	Kayoa	82.04.13.2004	Ake Jailolo	6.40	258	97781
Kayoa Utara	Kayoa	82.04.13.2005	Wayasipang	2.50	269	97781
Kayoa Utara	Kayoa	82.04.13.2006	Ngokonalako	2.60	389	97781
Kayoa Barat	Mauri	82.04.11.2001	Bokimiake	10.40	806	97781
Kayoa Barat	Mauri	82.04.11.2002	Hatejawa	6.10	538	97781
Kayoa Barat	Mauri	82.04.11.2003	Busua	6.10	2,419	97781
Kayoa Barat	Mauri	82.04.11.2004	Fofao	4.50	358	97781

== Languages and archaeology ==
There are two native languages on Kayoa island, as well as Indonesian. The language named West Makian, spoken by about 12,000 people in Kayoa and its outlying islands, is one of the North Halmahera languages, which appear to fall within the West Papuan family. The language named Taba or East Makian is one of the Austronesian languages.

Archaeological evidence shows a foraging culture on Kayoa before around 3,500 years ago, changing at that time to an agricultural way of life with animals including pigs and dogs, red-slipped pottery, shell bracelets and beads, and polished stone tools such as adzes. This change shows the arrival on Kayoa of a new culture by 1500 BC. From 2,000 years ago the islands started to trade spices to India and beyond. Chinese copper money is found in jar burials of between 2,000 and 1,000 years ago in the Uattamdi cave shelter on Kayoa, implying that trade in cloves began early on the island. With the jars are glass beads, pieces of bronze and iron, and large shells from the coral reef. One of the burial vessels has rectangular and triangular patterns like those found at Leang Buidane but not on nearby islands.

== Natural history ==
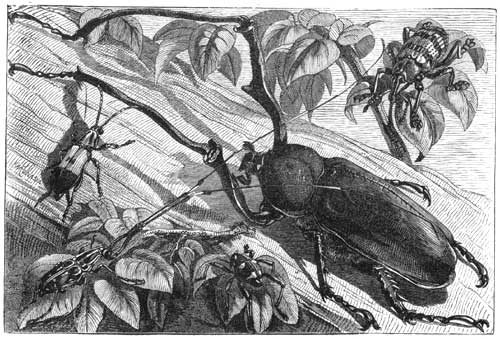
"Moluccan Beetles"

Naturalist Alfred Russel Wallace visited Kayoa, as described in his 1869 book The Malay Archipelago. He records that

The next day (October 16th [1858]) I went beyond the swamp, and found a place where a new clearing was being made in the virgin forest... I have never in my life seen beetles so abundant as they were on this spot. Some dozen species of good-sized golden Buprestidae, green rose-chafers (Lomaptera), and long-horned weevils (Anthribidae) were so abundant that they rose up in swarms as I walked along, filling the air with a loud buzzing hum. Along with these, several fine Longicorns were almost equally common, forming such an assemblage as for once to realize that idea of tropical luxuriance which one obtains by looking over the drawers of a well-filled cabinet... It was a glorious spot, and one which will always live in my memory as exhibiting the insect-life of the tropics in unexampled luxuriance.

— Wallace

== Bibliography ==
- Wallace, Alfred Russel (1869). The Malay Archipelago: The land of the orang-utan, and the bird of paradise. A narrative of travel, with sketches of man and nature (1 ed.). Macmillan.
