= Taba language =

Austronesian language spoken in North Maluku, Indonesia

Taba
- East Makian, Makian Dalam
- Native to: Indonesia
- Region: North Maluku province
- Ethnicity: Makian people (Tabayana)
- Native speakers: (20,000+ cited 1983)
- Language family: Austronesian: Malayo-Polynesian; Central–Eastern Malayo-Polynesian; Eastern Malayo-Polynesian; South Halmahera–West New Guinea; Raja Ampat–South Halmahera; South Halmahera; Southern; Taba

Language codes
- ISO 639-3: mky
- Glottolog: east2440
- ELP: Taba

Taba (also known as East Makian or Makian Dalam) is a Malayo-Polynesian language of the South Halmahera–West New Guinea group. It is spoken mostly on the islands of Makian, Kayoa and southern Halmahera in North Maluku province of Indonesia by about 20,000 people.

== Dialects ==
There are minor differences in dialect between all of the villages on Makian island in which Taba is spoken. Most differences affect only a few words. One of the most widespread reflexes is the use of /o/ in Waikyon and Waigitang, where in other villages /a/ is retained from Proto-South Halmaheran.

== Geographic distribution ==
As of 2005, Ethnologue lists Taba as having a speaking population of approximately 20,000; however, it has been argued by linguists that this number could in reality be anywhere between 20,000 and 50,000. The language is predominantly spoken on the eastern part of Makian Island, although it is also found on the southern island of Mori, Kayoa, Bacan, and Obi, and along the west coast of south Halmahera. There has also been continued migration of speakers to other areas of North Maluku due to frequent volcanic eruptions on Makian Island. The island itself is home to two languages: Taba, which is spoken on the eastern side of the island, and a Papuan language spoken on the western side, known alternatively as West Makian or Makian Luar (Outer Makian); in Taba, this language is known as Taba Lik ('Outer Taba'), while its native speakers know it as Moi.

== Speech levels ==
Taba is divided into three different levels of speech: alus, biasa, and kasar.

The alus, or 'refined' Taba, is used in situations in which the speaker is addressing someone older or of greater status than the speaker themselves.

The biasa, or 'ordinary' Taba, is used in most general situations.

The kasar, or 'coarse' form of Taba, is used only rarely and generally in anger.

== Phonology ==
Taba has fifteen indigenous consonant phonemes, and four loan phonemes: /ʔ dʒ tʃ f/. These are shown below:

Consonants
		Bilabial	Apico- alveolar	Lamino- palatal	Dorso- velar	Glottal
Nasal		m	n		ŋ	
Plosive/ Affricate	voiceless	p	t	(tʃ)	k	(ʔ)
Plosive/ Affricate	voiced	b	d	(dʒ)	ɡ	
Fricative		(f)	s			
Trill			r			
Approximant		w	l	j		h

Syllables may only have complex onsets at the beginning of morphemic units. The minimal Taba syllable consists of just a vowel, while the maximal indigenous syllable structure is CCVC (there are some examples of CCCVC from Dutch). The structure CCVC, however, is only found in syllables which occur at the beginning of morphemes; non-initial syllables have a maximal structure of CVC. The vast majority of words are mono- or disyllabic.

All consonants except /j/, /w/, /r/, and /dʒ/ can be geminated. Geminates can occur word-initially, e.g., tala /tala/ 'to meet' vs. ttala /tːala/ 'we (inclusive) meet'. Some speakers degeminate /hː/ to [h]. Initial fricative clusters can be metathesized or assimilated (e.g., /ˈhsɔpan/ can become [ˈshɔpan] or [ˈsːɔpan]).

The vowel phonemes of Taba on a vowel chart

Taba has five vowels, illustrated on the table below. The front and central vowels are unrounded; the back vowels are rounded.

Vowels
	Front	Central	Back
Close	i iː		u uː
Mid	ɛ ɛː		ɔ ɔː
Open		a aː	

== Grammar ==
=== Word order ===
Taba is, predominantly, a head-marking language which adheres to a basic AVO word order. However, there is a reasonable degree of flexibility.

yak k=ha-lekat pakakas ne
1SG 1SG=CAUS-broken tool PROX
'I broke this tool.'

Taba has both prepositions and postpositions.

=== Pronouns ===
Independent Pronouns
		Singular	Plural
1st person	exclusive	yak	am
1st person	inclusive	yak	tit
2nd person		au	meu
3rd person		i	si

In Taba, pronouns constitute an independent, closed set. Syntactically, Taba pronouns can be used in any context where a full noun phrase is applicable. However, independent pronouns are only used in reference to animate entities, unless pronominal reference to inanimate patients is required in reflexive clauses.

As mentioned, independent pronouns are generally used for animate reference. However, there are two exceptions to this generalisation. In some circumstances an inanimate is considered a 'higher inanimate' which accords syntactic status similar to animates. This is represented as in English where inanimates such as cars or ships, for example, can be ascribed a gender. This is illustrated below in a response to the question 'Why did the Taba Jaya (name of a boat) stop coming to Makian?':

Ttumo i te ndara
t=tum-o i te ndara
1PL.INCL=follow-APPL 3SG NEG too.much
'We didn't catch it enough.'

The Taba Jaya, a boat significant enough to be given a name, is accorded pronoun status similar to animates. The other exception occurs in reflexive clauses where a pronominal copy of a reflexive patient is required, as shown below:

Bonci ncayak i tadia
bonci n-say-ak i ta-dia
peanut 3SG-spread-APPL 3SG SIM-REM
'Peanut (leaves) spread out on itself like that.'

Non-human animates and inanimates are always grammatically singular, regardless of how many referents are involved. In Taba, pronouns and noun phrases are marked by person and number.

=== Person ===
Taba distinguishes three persons in the pronominal and cross-referencing systems. Person is marked on both pronouns and on cross-referencing proclitics attached to verb phrases. The actor cross-referencing proclitics are outlined in the following table. In the first-person plural, a clusivity distinction is made, 'inclusive' (including the addressee) and 'exclusive' (excluding the addressee), as is common to most Austronesian languages.

Cross-referencing proclitics
		Singular	Plural
1st person	exclusive	k=	a=
1st person	inclusive	k=	t=
2nd person		m=	h=
3rd person		n=	l=

The following are examples (4–10) of simple actor intransitive clauses showing each of the proclitic prefixes.

Intransitive Clauses
		Singular	Plural
1st person	exclusive	yak kwom yak k=wom 1SG 1SG=come 'I've come'	Am awom am a=wom 1PL.EXCL 1PL.EXCL=come 'We've come. (myself and one or more other people but not you)'
1st person	inclusive	yak kwom yak k=wom 1SG 1SG=come 'I've come'	Tit twom tit t=wom 1PL.INCL 1PL.INCL=come 'We've come. (You and I)'
2nd person		Au mwom au m=wom 2SG 2SG=come 'You've come. (you singular)'	Meu hwom meu h=wom 2PL 2PL=come 'You've come. (you plural)'
3rd person		I nwom i n=wom 3SG 3SG=come 'S/he's come.'	Si lwom si l=wom 3PL 3PL=come 'They've come.'

The alternation between proclitic markers indicates number, where in (4) k= denotes the arrival of a singular actor, while in (7) a= indicates the arrival of first-person plural actors, exclusionary of the addressee, and is replicated in the change of prefix in the additional examples.

=== Number ===
Number is marked on noun phrases and pronouns. Taba distinguishes grammatically between singular and plural categories, as shown in (3) to (9) above. Plural marking is obligatory for humans and is used for all noun phrases which refer to multiple individuals. Plurality is also used to indicate respect in the second and third Person when addressing or speaking of an individual who is older than the speaker. The rules for marking number on noun phrases are summarised in the table below:

Marking Number
	singular	plural
human	Used for one person when person is same age or younger than speaker.	Used for one person when person is older than speaker. Used for more than one person in all contexts.
non-human animate	Used no matter how many referents	Not used
inanimate	Used no matter how many referents	Not used

The enclitic =si marks number in noun phrases. =si below (10), indicates that there is more than one child playing on the beach and, in (11), the enclitic indicates that the noun phase mama lo baba, translated as 'mother and father,' is plural.

Wangsi lalawa lawe solo li
wang=si l=ha=lawa la-we solo li
child=PL 3pl=CAUS-play sea-ESS beach LOC
'The children are playing on the beach.'

Nim mama li babasi laoblak
nim mama lo baba=si l-ha=obal-k
2SG.POSS mother and father=PL 3PL=CAUS-call-APPL
'Your mother and father are calling you.'

Plural number is used as a marker of respect not only for second-person addressees, but for third-person referents as seen in (12). In Taba, it has been observed that many adults use deictic shifts towards the perspective of addressee children regarding the use of plural markers. Example (13) is typical of an utterance of an older person than those they are referring to, indicative of respect that should be accorded to the referent by the addressee.

Ksung Om Nur nidi um li
k=sung Om Nur nidi um li
1SG=enter Uncle Nur 3PL.POSS house LOC
'I went into Om Nur's house.'

Nim babasi e lo li e?
nim baba=si e lo li e
2SG.POSS father=PL FOC where LOC FOC
'Where is your father?'

==== Pronominal affixes ====
All Taba verbs having actor arguments carry affixes which cross-reference the number and person of the actor, examples of proclitics are shown above. In Taba, there are valence-changing affixes which deal with patterns of cross-referencing with three distinct patterns. The dominant pattern is used with all verbs having an actor argument. The other two patterns are confined to a small number of verbs: one for the possessive verb, the other for a few verbs of excretion. This is discussed further in Possession below.

=== Possession ===
Taba does not, as such, have possessive pronouns. Rather, the possessor noun and the possessed entity are linked by a possessive ligature. The Taba ligatures are shown below:

Possessive Particles
		Singular	Plural
1st person	exclusive	nik	am
1st person	inclusive	nik	nit
2nd person		nim	meu
3rd person		ni	nidi/di

==== Adnominal possession ====
Adnominal possession involves the introduction of an inflected possessive particle between the possessor and the possessed entity; this inflected possessive, formally categorised as a 'ligature', is cross-referenced with the number and person of the possessor. This ligature indicates a possessive relationship between a modifier noun and its head-noun. In Taba, adnominal possession is distinguished by reverse genitive ordering, in which the possessor noun precedes the noun referring to the possessed entity.

In many contexts the possessor will not be overtly referenced.

Example of reverse genitive ordering in Taba:

ni mtu
3SG.POSS child
'His/her child.'

==== Obligatory possessive marking ====
In Taba, alienable and inalienable possession is not obligatorily marked by the use of different forms, though this is common in many related languages. However, there are a number of seemingly inalienable entities which cannot be referred to without referencing a possessor.

For example:

meja ni wwe
table 3SG.POSS leg
'The leg (of the table).'

==== Verbal possession ====
Verbal possession in Taba is generally indicated through the attaching of the causative prefix ha- to the adnominal possessive forms. The possessor then becomes actor of the clause, and the possessed entity becomes the undergoer. This method of forming a possessive verb is very unusual, typologically, and is found in almost no other languages.

kabin da yak k=ha-nik
goat DIST 1SG 1SG=CAUS-1SG.POSS
'That goat, I own it.'

=== Negation ===
Like other Central-Eastern Malayo-Polynesian languages spoken in the Maluku Islands, Taba uses different particles to negate declarative and imperative clauses; declaratives are negated using te, while imperatives are negated using oik. In both cases the negative particles are clause-final, a placement which is posited to be the result of contact with non-Austronesian Papuan languages.

==== Negation of declaratives using te ====
Declarative clauses are negated using the particle te, which follows all other elements of the clause except for modal and aspectual particles (these are discussed below). Examples (15a) and (15b) show negation of an actor intransitive clause, while (16a) and (16b) give negation of a non-actor bivalent clause (i.e. a clause with two undergoer arguments); te has the same clause-final placement regardless of the clause structure.

Nhan akla
n=han ak-la
3sg=go ALL-sea
'She's going seawards.'

Nhan akla te
n=han ak-la te
3sg=go ALL-sea NEG
'She's not going seawards.'

Nik calana kudak asfal
nik ak-lacalana kuda-k asfal
1sg.POSS trousers be.black-APPL bitumen
'My trousers are blackened with bitumen.'

Nik calana kudak asfal te
nik ak-lacalana kuda-k asfal te
1sg.POSS trousers be.black-APPL bitumen NEG
'My trousers are not blackened with bitumen.'

Negation of complex sentences can be ambiguous — see example (17), where te can operate on either just the complement clause khan 'I'm going' or to the whole clause complex kalusa khan 'I said I'm going':

Kalusa khan te
k=ha-lusa k=han te
1sg=CAUS-say 1sg=go NEG
'I said I'm not going.' / 'I didn't say I'm going.'

Negative existential clauses

Te can serve as the predicator of a negative existential clause, with no verb required. It can occur immediately following the noun phrase that refers to whatever is being asserted as non-existent, as in (18):

Nik dalawat te
nik dalawat te
1sg.POSS girlfriend NEG
'I don't have a girlfriend.'

However, a discourse marker is generally interposed between the noun phrase and te. This marker expresses something about how the non-existence of the noun phrase's referent relates to the discourse context, or alternatively indicates the speaker's attitude towards the proposition. In (19), the discourse marker mai (glossed as 'but') is used to indicate that the non-existence of tea, sugar and coffee in the household described by the speaker is counter to one's expectations that a normal household would have these items:

Te mai te; gula mai te; kofi mai te
tea but NEG sugar but NEG coffee but NEG
'There's no tea; there's no sugar; there's no coffee.'

Complex negative modal / aspectual particles

Taba has three complex negative particles which, in addition to negation, express mood or aspect; these are formed by the modal and aspectual particles attaching onto te as clitics. The three particles are tedo (realis negative), tehu (continuative negative), and tesu (potential negative).

tedo (realis negative)

Tedo is a compound of te and the realis mood marker do, and expresses a more emphatic negation than plain te. In (20), it is used to emphasize the absolute nature of the prohibition against making alcohol in the Muslim community of the speaker:

Mai ane lpeik saguer tedo.
mai a-ne l=pe-ik saguer te-do
but DEM-PROX 3pl=make-APPL palm.wine NEG-REAL
'But here they don't make palm wine with it anymore.'

tehu (continuative negative)

Tehu is a compound of te and the continuous aspect marker hu, and can be roughly translated as 'not up to the relevant point in time': this may be either the time of utterance (i.e. 'not yet', 'still not'), or some other time relevant to the context of the utterance, as in (21). Unlike the potential negative tesu, tehu does not express any expectations about the likelihood of the negated event or state occurring in the future.

Manganco ne dukon tehu
manganco ne dukon te-hu
long.time PROX eruption NEG-CONT
'For a long time there hadn't been an eruption.'

Tehu also often appears at the end of the first clause in a sequence of clauses, indicating whatever is referred to by the first clause has not still occurred by the time of the event(s) or state(s) referred to by the following clauses.

Karna taplod tehu, manusia loas do.
karna ta-plod te-hu manusia l=oas do
because DETR-erupt NEG-CONT people 3pl=flee REAL
'Because the mountain had still not erupted when everyone fled.'

tesu (potential negative)

Tesu is formed by suffixing -su, expressing the potential mood, to te. Although tesu is similar to tehu in that it encodes the meaning 'not up to the relevant point in time', it also expresses an expectation that the event referred to will occur in the future: this expectation is made explicit in the free translation of (23).

Sedi ne dumik tesu
sedi ne dumik te-su
garden.shelter PROX be.complete NEG-POT
'This garden shelter is not yet finished.' [but I expect it to be finished later]

Tesu shares with tehu the ability to be used at the end of the first clause in a sequence of clauses, and also carries a similar meaning of incompletion; in addition, it encodes the expectation that the event referred to by the first clause should have happened by the event(s) of the following clauses. This expectation does not need to have actually been fulfilled; the breakfast that was expected to be cooked in the first clause of (24) was, in reality, never cooked due to the ensuing eruption.

Hadala mosa tesu, taplod haso nak.
hadala mosa te-su ta-plod ha=so nak
breakfast be.cooked NEG-POT DETR-erupt CL=one also
'Breakfast was still not cooked (although I had every expectation that it would be) when it erupted again.'

Unlike the modal and aspectual markers which are used to form the other complex negative particles, su is not attested as a free morpheme elsewhere; however, it is likely related to the optional final -s of the modal verb -ahate(s) 'to be unable', which appears to be derived historically from te having fused onto the verb -ahan 'to be able'. When used with a final -s, as in (25b) compared with (25a), this modal verb encodes the same meanings expressed by tesu:

Irianti nasodas nahate
Irianti n=ha-sodas n=ahate
Irianti 3sg=CAUS-suck[smoke] 3sg=be.unable
'Irianti is not allowed to smoke.'

Iswan nasodas nahates
Iswan n=ha-sodas n=ahate-s
Iswan 3sg=CAUS-suck[smoke] 3sg=be.unable-POT
'Iswan is not allowed to smoke (now. But he will be allowed to in the future).'

==== Negation of imperatives using oik ====
Imperative clauses are negated using the admonitive particle oik. This particle appears to be derived from a verb oik 'to leave something behind'; however, this verb requires actor cross-referencing, whereas the particle is never cross-referenced. Bowden (2001) posits that the imperative use of oik has developed from the use of the independent verb in serial verb constructions, with the morphological elements being lost in the process of grammaticalization. The particle is shown in (26), while the verbal use (with cross-referencing) is shown in (27):

Hmomas meu komo mai hmomsak meu calana oik
h=momas meu komo mai h=momas=ak meu calana oik
2PL=wipe 2PL.POSS hand but 2PL=wipe=APPL 2PL.POSS trousers ADMON
'Wipe your hands, but don't wipe them with your trousers.'

Nim suka moik nim sagala ane?
nim suka m=oik nim sagala a-ne
2SG.POSS desire 2SG=leave.behind 2SG.POSS stuff LOC-PROX
'Do you want to leave your stuff behind here?'

==== Using negative particles as question tags ====
Yes–no (polar) questions can be posed with either positive or negative polarity; positive polarity questions operate in much the same way as in English, while negative polarity questions, which are formed using forms of the negative marker te as question tags, work in a different manner. An example of a positive polarity question is given below in (28a), while (28b) shows a negative polarity question:

Masodas pa ne?
m=ha-sodas pa ne
2sg=CAUS-suck or PROX
'Do you smoke?'

Masodas pa te?
m=ha-sodas pa te
2sg=CAUS-suck or NEG
'Do you smoke or not?'

The answers to the positive polarity may be either Jou/Ole ('Yes, I do smoke') or Te ('No, I don't smoke'); when responding to the negative polarity question, the answers are either Jou/Ole ('Yes, I do not smoke'), Te ('No, I do smoke').

== Demonstratives and directionals ==
Taba has two systems which are both involved in marking deixis: the demonstrative and the directional systems. Although compared to other Austronesian languages Taba is typologically unusual in that its grammar involves little morphology, this is not the case when it comes to demonstratives and directionals. Both of these systems involve root morphemes which can occur either on their own or with affixes, creating a large variety of meanings.

=== Demonstratives ===
There are two demonstrative roots in Taba: ne, which expresses proximity to the speaker, and dia (or shortened form da), which expresses distance from the speaker. Each of these roots can be combined with a variety of morphemes to produce different nouns and pronouns, as follows:

Demonstratives
		ne (≈ this)	dia/da (≈ that)
		Proximal	Distal
Root forms		ne	dia/da
Demonstrative pronouns	sg.	ine	idia
Demonstrative pronouns	pl.	sine	sidia
Locative nouns		ane	adia
Similative nouns	'biasa'	tane	tadia
Similative nouns	'alus'	tadine	taddia
Similative nouns		hatadine	hatadia
Similative nouns	'kasar'	dodine	dodia

Note: the three different categories of similative nouns refer to the three different registers of Taba, which have been ascribed the following meanings: biasa ('normal'), alus ('fine/respectful') and kasar ('coarse').

==== Root forms ====
Root forms ne and dia have a deictic function with respect to the speaker, and can express the speaker's physical, textural, temporal or even emotional and spiritual distance from something. These forms, when used on their own, occur immediately after the noun phrase to which they refer, much like the equivalent forms in many other Malayo-Polynesian languages. Examples of the root forms functioning as such can be seen below:

pakakas ne
tool PROX
'this tool'

kurusi da
chair DIST
'that chair'

Demonstrative root forms in Taba, like in most other languages, can also be used to refer to concepts previously mentioned in a conversation, as per the following example:

Ndadi dukon ne taun halim do.
ndadi dukon ne taun ha=lim do
so eruption PROX year CL=five REAL
'So the eruption was five years ago.'

Although the demonstrative roots are a closed class and most clearly mark deixis, they also belong to a slightly larger class of deictics, including the directional root ya ('up'). When this directional root is used deictically, it implies that both the speaker and hearer hold some common knowledge about the referent.

Directionals will be discussed in further detail in the next section. See below an example of ya functioning deictically:

Malcoma yak ni foto ya
m=alcoma yak ni foto ya
2sg=send 1sg 3sg.POSS photograph REC
'Send me the photographs (that I have just referred to, and which we both know about'

==== Demonstrative pronouns ====
Taba has four demonstrative pronouns, each formed through the affixation of a pronoun to the demonstrative root. This process, as well as the rough English translation for each pronoun is outlined in the table below:

Demonstrative pronouns
	ne	da/dia
	Proximal	Distal
singular	ine i-ne SG-PROX 'this' (near speaker)	ida / idia i-da / i-dia SG-DIST / SG-DIST 'that' (away from speaker)
plural	sine si-ne PL-PROX 'these' (near speaker)	sida / sidia si-da / si-dia PL-DIST / PL-DIST 'those' (away from speaker)

Taba's demonstrative pronouns can also be used to refer to a concept previously mentioned in a conversation, or a series of previously described events, as shown in the next two examples:

Idia Minggu
i-dia Minggu
3SG-DIST Sunday
'That was Sunday'

Lai tam idia
lai t=am i-dia
just 1PL.INCL=see 3SG-DIST
'We had just seen all of this (for the first time)'

==== Locative nouns ====
Taba has two locative nouns, formed by the prefixation of a-. The formation of these nouns and their rough English translations can be found in the table below:

Locative nouns
ne	dai/dia
Proximal	Distal
ane a-ne LOC-PROX 'here'	adia a-dia LOC-DIST 'there'

Here are two examples showing the locative nouns in use, occurring after the noun to which they refer:

Si ane te
Si a-ne te
3PL LOC-PROX NEG
'He wasn't there'

Peda adia loka ni umpo lema
peda a-dia loka ni um-po le-ma
machete LOC-DIST banana 3SG.POSS NOM-down land-VEN
'The machete is there, landwards from the bottom of the banana tree'

==== Similative nouns ====
Taba has eight similative nouns, which differ between the language's three registers. Many other Austronesian languages have similative noun equivalents, but Taba is unique in that it has such a high number. The eight different forms can be found in the table below, where the labels ascribed to each register by Taba speakers are as such: biasa ('normal'), alus ('fine/respectful') and kasar ('coarse').

	ne	di/dia
	Proximal	Distal
biasa	tane	tadia
alus	tadine	taddia
	hatadine	hatadia
kasar	dodine	dodia

Below is an example of a similative noun occurring naturally in a conversation:

Napnap um ni llo ya mlongan tane
yapyap um ni llo ya mlongan ta-ne
ash house 3SG.POSS inside REC be.long SIM-PROX
'The ash inside the house was as deep as this'

Similative nouns in Taba can also occur as single-word utterances and as adverbs, as in the following examples:

Tadia!
ta-dia
SIM-DIST
'It's done like that!', 'I've done it!', 'Tadaa!' etc.

Tit tpe tane
tit t-pe ta-ne
1PL.INCL 1PL.INCL.do SIM-PROX
'We do it like this'

=== Directionals ===
As for the directional system, Taba has five basic semantic categories. These, along with their roughly translated English equivalents are: ya ('up'), po ('down'), la ('sea'), le ('land') and no ('there'). Like demonstratives, directionals in Taba can be affixed to express more complex meanings, namely motion towards or from a direction, position in a direction, and parts of something that are oriented in a particular direction. This kind of morphology is unusual within Taba, but typologically common compared to many other Austronesian languages. It is worth noting that while the directional roots in Taba can have rough English translations, utterances containing them will often have senseless meanings if translated directly into English.

All Taba directionals formed by affixation can be found in the table below. The essive forms refer to static location in a particular direction and the allative forms refer to motion towards a particular direction. The venitive forms refer to motion away from a particular direction and the nominalised forms refer to parts of something that are oriented in a particular direction.

Directionals
Gloss	'up'	'down'	'sea'	'land'	'there'
Root	ya	po	la	le	no
Essive 'ESS'	yase	pope	lawe	lewe	noge
Allative 'ALL'	attia	appo	akl	akla	akno
Venitive 'VEN'	yama	poma	lame	lema	noma
Nominalised 'NOM'	tattubo	umpo	kla	kle	kno

==== Essive forms ====
Essive directionals in Taba, as stated above, signify static location in a particular direction. These forms can have a larger range of functions when compared with the other directionals. Namely, they can occur as verb adjuncts, both with a locative phrase and alone. They can occur either before or after a verb, or to modify a noun phrase. Shown below is an example of the essive forms being used in a sentence:

Sama lo John nalusa ni abu nwom lawe
Sama lo John n=ha-lusa ni abu n=wom la-we
same as John 3sg=CAUS-say 3sg.POSS ash 3sg=come sea-ESS
'Just like you (John) said the ash (from the eruption) fell in Australia'

==== Allative forms ====
Allative directional forms in Taba express movement towards a particular direction. These forms can occur on their own, after the verb as an adjunct, or at the head of a locative phrase. Examples of these two functions occurring in natural speech are shown below:

Ncopang akla
n=sopang ak-la
3SG=descend ALL-sea
'It descended to the sea'

Malai lhan appo
Malai l=han ap-po
then 3PL=go ALL-down
'Then they went downwards'

==== Venitive forms ====
Venitive directional forms in Taba express movement away from a particular direction. These forms are much freer in word order and can occur at many different places within a clause, serving to modify verbs, as seen in the next two examples:

Noma noma turus manusia lwom
no-ma no-ma turus manusia l=wom
there-VEN there-VEN direct people 3pl=come
'From here and there the people came'

Nyoa khan lama, polisisi ltahan yak
n=yoa k=han la-ma polisi=si l=tahan yak
{3sg=search (almost)} 1sg=go sea-VEN police-PL 3pl=find 1sg
'I'd almost come back from Moti when the police found me'

Venitive forms can also occur in utterances without any verbs, such as in the following example:

Motor Payahe lema yak
motor Payahe le-ma yak
boat Payahe land-VEN 1sg
'I came on the boat from Payahe'

The suffix -ma, used to form venitive directionals is likely derived from the word *maRi ('come'), that has been reconstructed for Proto-Austronesian.>

==== Nominalised forms ====
Nominalised directional forms in Taba signify parts of an object that are oriented towards a particular direction. These forms are always possessed by and occur after the noun relative to which the location is being expressed. This is illustrated in the following two examples:

Kapal ya pso nuso lawe Botan ni umpo lawe
Kapal ya p-so n=uso la-we Botan ni um-po la-we
ship REC CL-one 3sg=follow sea-ESS Halmahera 3sg.POSS NOM-down sea-ESS
'There was a ship following along underneath Halmahera'

I ntongo {'Happy Restaurant'} ni kle
i n=tongo {'Happy Restaurant'} ni k-le
3sg 3sg=stay {'Happy Restaurant'} 3sg.POSS NOM-land
'He's staying landwards from the 'Happy Restaurant''

== List of glossing abbreviations ==
This section contains only the glossing abbreviations that appear in this article. For a full list, see List of glossing abbreviations.

Gloss	Meaning
ADMON	admonitive mood
ALL	allative case
APPL	applicative voice
CAUS	causative
CL	classifier
CONT	continuous aspect
DEM	demonstrative
DETR	detransitivizer
DIST	distal demonstrative
ESS	essive case
FOC	focus
LOC	locative case
NEG	negation
NOM	nominative case
PL	plural
POSS	possessive marker
POT	potential mood
PROX	proximal demonstrative
REAL	realis mood
REC	reciprocal voice
REM	remote past tense
SG	singular
SIM	simultaneous aspect
VEN	venitive

== Name taboo (aroah) ==
As is common with many Melanesian people, Taba speakers practice ritual name taboo. As such, when a person dies in a Taba community, their name may not be used by any person with whom they had a close connection. This practice adheres to the Makianese belief that, if the names of the recently deceased are uttered, their spirits may be drastically disturbed. The deceased may be referred to simply as 'Deku's mother' or 'Dula's sister'. Others in the community with the same name as the deceased will be given maronga, or substitute names.
