= Battle of Tidore =

Battle of Tidore (1536)
- Part of Portuguese Battle in the East
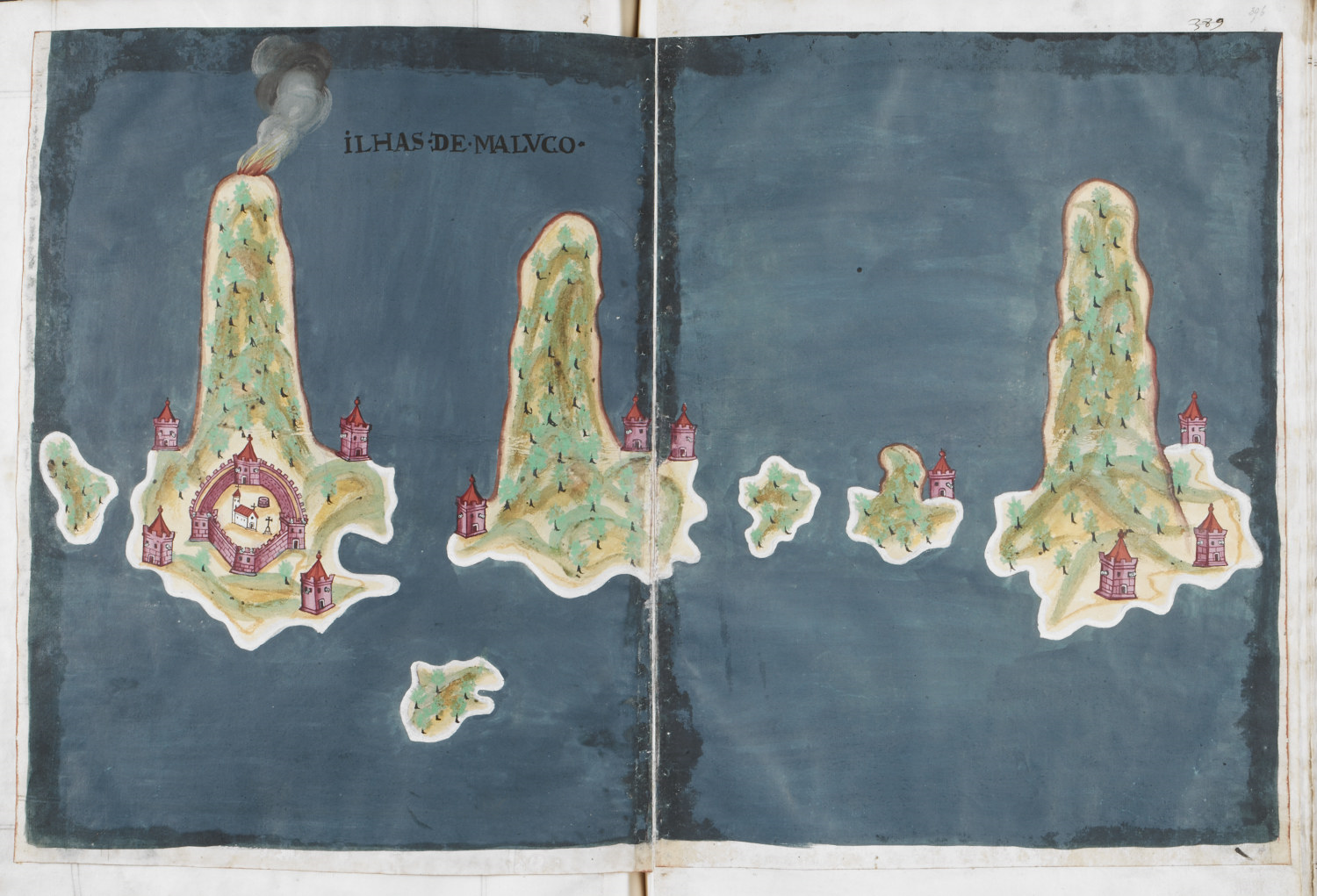
- Portuguese depiction of the Moluccas
| Date | 21 December 1536. |
| Location | Tidore, Moluccas |
| Result | Portuguese–Hairun victory |

Belligerents
| Portuguese Empire; Ternate loyal to Hairun | Ternate loyal to Dayal; Sultanate of Tidore; Sultanate of Bacan; Sultanate of Jailolo; Kingdom of Vaigama; Kingdom of Vaigue; Kingdom of Quibibi; Kingdom of Mincibo |

Commanders and leaders
| António Galvão; Sultan Hairun | Dayal of Ternate †; Mir of Tidore; Alauddin of Bacan; Katarabumi of Geilolo; 4 unnamed Papuan kings |

Strength
| 6 ships; 120 Portuguese soldiers; 80 musketeers | 30,000 men 500–600 firearms |

Casualties and losses
| Few | Heavy |

The Battle of Tidore in 1536 was a military engagement between the forces of the Portuguese Empire, and those of eight united rulers of the archipelago.

After conducting an amphibious attack on Tidore, the heavily outnumbered Portuguese led by António Galvão assaulted and razed the city of Tidore. The coalition fell apart shortly afterwards and the region submitted to Portuguese rule.

== Context ==
In 1535, the Portuguese captain of Ternate Tristão de Ataíde deposed Sultan Tabarija of Ternate under the accusation of persecuting Christians, plotting to assassinate him and to capture the fortress of Ternate. In his place, Ataíde installed Sultan Hairun on the throne. As a result, Ternate, Tidore, Geilolo and Bacan supported the claim of Sultan Dayal to the throne and united in a widespread revolt against the Portuguese. The Portuguese fort São João Baptista was sieged and the garrison was nearly driven to starvation.

On October 27, 1536, Ataídes successor António Galvão arrived with two ships and considerable aid in both supplies and reinforcements. Galvão offered the rulers peace, but as they refused and attacked the Portuguese during a truce, after lending succour to the beleaguered garrison he moved with a small flotilla against Tidore, where four Mollucan monarchs and four Papuan ones had gathered with their forces in the expectation of a final assault on the fortress.

== Battle ==
Galvão assembled a flotilla composed of 2 carracks, 1 brigantine, 1 kelulus and 2 prahus, with which he sailed in front of Tidore city, where the enemy forces were concentrated and which was bombarded. He landed with his forces undetected, under the cover of darkness a little after midnight, at some distance from the city. By sunrise they assaulted the city on the land-side and killed Dayal in a pitched battle in front of the city. Its walls were then scaled, and the city was torched, with the exception of the mosque, which Galvão kept as his campaign quarters. Galvão forbade his soldiers from harming women, children and elderly.

== Aftermath ==
Various attempts at dislodging the Portuguese and kill Galvão failed. Seeing no way to fight the Portuguese, the allied rulers began reembarking back to their islands. Sultan Mir therefore requested peace. Alauddin of Bacan and Katarabumi of Geilolo soon followed, until the entire region was pacified under Portuguese suzerainty.

Although he razed the city of Tidore, Galvão lent his assistance in rebuilding it in exchange for peace. Galvãos judicious behavior helped quell the revolt in Ternate against the Portuguese and Hairun. A Portuguese fleet later defeated a large fleet dispatched from Java, Banda, Macassar and Ambon to obtain cloves in the region by force.

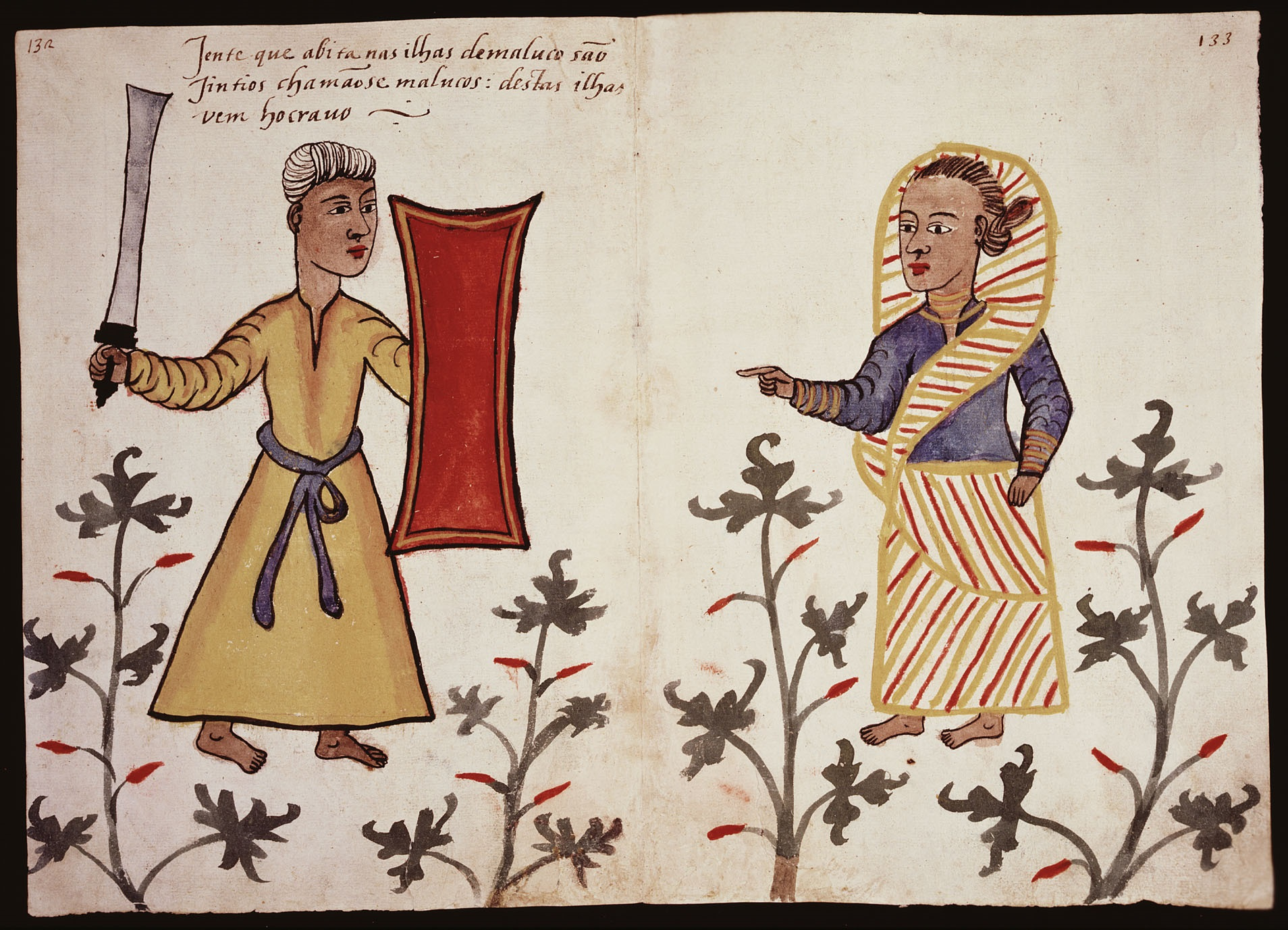
16th century Portuguese watercolour of Moluccans, featured in the Códice Casanatense.

== See also ==
- Siege of Bintan
- Portuguese Empire in the Indonesian Archipelago
