= Jorge de Menezes =

Portuguese explorer (c.1498–1537)

Jorge de Menezes (also spelt Meneses) (c. 1498 – 1537) was a Portuguese explorer. Due to a monsoon, he was forced to reside in Versya, posited by Pieter Anton Tiele as Waisai, between 1526 and 1527. Menezes called the region Ilhas dos Papuas, though the name of "Papua" was already known at the time. Yet he was still the first European to go ashore and thus credited with the European discovery of New Guinea.

== Biography ==
As a nobleman, he was possibly the "D. Jorge de Meneses" present at the His Most Faithful Majesty's Council of Manuel I of Portugal in 1518 and 1519. In 1526, Menezes traveled to Brunei, detailing the city as being fortified by a brick wall and having a moderate number of notable buildings. His visit opened a new route to the Moluccas, becoming the favored course to Ternate. Successor to Antonio de Brito, Menezes was the Portuguese Governor of the Moluccas from 1527 until 1530, residing in Ternate. On 22 August 1526, he left Portuguese Malacca with 100 men to take his post but was sidetracked by a monsoon, leading to his discovery of New Guinea; he arrived in Ternate on 31 May 1527.

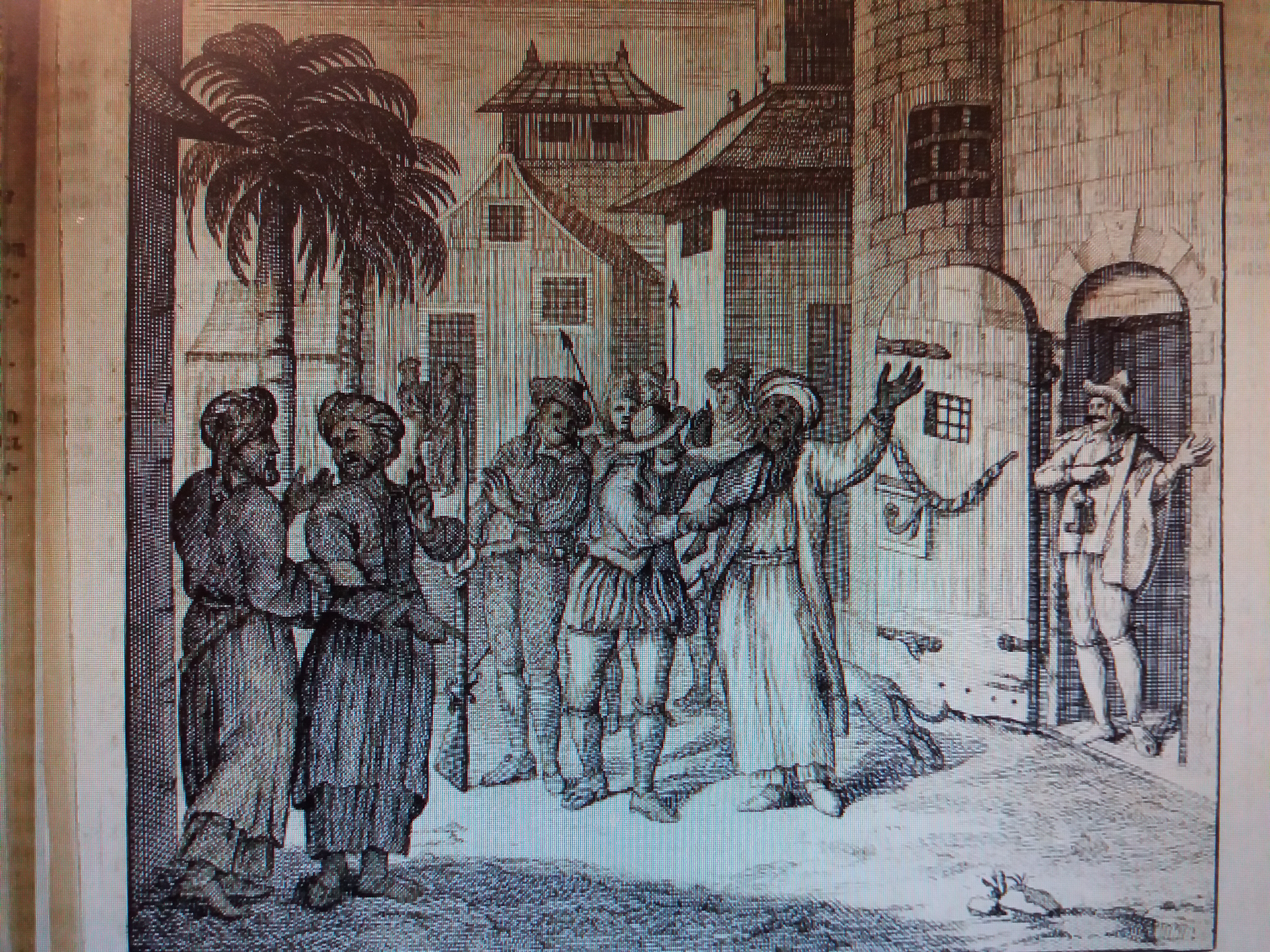
Meneses's men insulting qadhi Vaidua, uncle of the sultan, by rubbing pork in his face; from François Valentyn's Oud en Nieuw Oost-Indien (1724).

In 1528, he captured and plundered a lightly defended Spanish fort commanded by Hernando de la Torre, during the competition between the empires over the Moluccas that ended with the Treaty of Zaragoza as well as a personal treaty with the Spanish and Menezes in 1529. He further involved the Portuguese in the affairs of the sultanate and held Boheyat and Dayal prisoner in Fort Kastela. Officials suspected of conspiring against him were executed. Beyond his political interferences, he committed atrocities against the population. Under orders of Dayal's mother, the fort was besieged. Subsequently, Menezes was arrested and sent to Old Goa, Portuguese India by his successor, Gonçalo Pereira. After his return to Portugal, he was banished to the Colony of Brazil. During a trip to Lisbon, Vasco Fernandes Coutinho left Menezes in charge of the Captaincy of Espírito Santo. He captured indigenous people and enslaved them on his sesmaria, provoking an attack that temporarily destroyed the captaincy and eradicated the colonists in 1537. Menezes died in combat during the assault.

== See also ==
- Portuguese Empire in the Indonesian Archipelago

== Bibliography ==
- Abdurachman, Paramita R. (1988). "'Niachile Pokaraga' A Sad Story of a Moluccan Queen". Modern Asian Studies. 22 (3): 571–592. doi:10.1017/S0026749X00009690. ISSN 0026-749X. JSTOR 312598. S2CID 145134513.
- Augeron, Mickaël; Vidal, Laurent (2007). Constructing Early Modern empires: proprietary ventures in the Atlantic world, 1500-1750. Leiden: Brill. ISBN 9789047419037.
- Bassett, D. K. (1963). "European Influence in South-East Asia, c.1500-1630". Journal of Southeast Asian History. 4 (2): 134–165. doi:10.1017/S0217781100002866. ISSN 0217-7811. JSTOR 20067447.
- Gerlich, Bianca (2013). "Finding the Island Mompracem. The Problem of Mapping the Northwest Coast of Borneo from 16th to 20th Century". Oriente Moderno. 93 (1): 32–78. doi:10.1163/22138617-12340001. ISSN 0030-5472. JSTOR 24710894.
- Kelly, Celsus (1948). "The Terra Australis-A Franciscan Quest". The Americas. 4 (4): 429–448. doi:10.2307/977829. ISSN 0003-1615. JSTOR 977829. S2CID 144576904.
- Humble Ferreira, Susannah C. (January 2004). "Development of the Portuguese royal council in the reign of Manuel I (1495-1521)". Portuguese Studies Review. 12 (1): 1–17.
- Kelsey, Harry (28 June 2016). The first circumnavigators: unsung heroes of the age of discovery. New Haven: Yale University Press. ISBN 9780300220865.
- Mostert, Tristan (2018). "Scramble for the spices: Makassar's role in European and Asian Competition in the Eastern Archipelago up to 1616". The Dutch and English East India Companies. Amsterdam University Press. pp. 25–54. doi:10.2307/j.ctv9hvqf2.6. ISBN 978-94-6298-329-8. JSTOR j.ctv9hvqf2.6. S2CID 239879513.
- Nowell, Charles E. (1936). "The Loaisa Expedition and the Ownership of the Moluccas". Pacific Historical Review. 5 (4): 325–336. doi:10.2307/3632888. ISSN 0030-8684. JSTOR 3632888.
- Pouwer, Jan (1999). "The Colonisation, Decolonisation and Recolonisation of West New Guinea". The Journal of Pacific History. 34 (2): 157–179. doi:10.1080/00223349908572900. ISSN 0022-3344. JSTOR 25161076.
- Riesenfeld, Alphonse (1951). "Tobacco in New Guinea and the Other Areas of Melanesia". The Journal of the Royal Anthropological Institute of Great Britain and Ireland. 81 (1/2): 69–102. doi:10.2307/2844017. ISSN 0307-3114. JSTOR 2844017.
- Russell-Wood, A. J. R. (1998). The Portuguese empire, 1415-1808 : a world on the move. Baltimore, MD: Johns Hopkins University Press. ISBN 0-8018-5955-7.
- Teriierooiterai, Jean-Claude (2018). "Contextualising the Bounty in Pacific Maritime Culture". The Bounty from the Beach. ANU Press. pp. 21–66. ISBN 978-1-76046-244-4. JSTOR j.ctv8bt270.6.
- Widjojo, Muridan S. (2009). The revolt of Prince Nuku: cross-cultural alliance-making in Maluku, c.1780-1810. Leiden: Brill. ISBN 9789047425335.
- Wright, Leigh (1977). "Brunei: An Historical Relic". Journal of the Hong Kong Branch of the Royal Asiatic Society. 17: 12–29. ISSN 0085-5774. JSTOR 23889576.
- Zanella, Fernando; Westley, Christopher (2015). "Degredados, Their Human Agency, and Micro Institutions in Colonial Brazil: An Institutionalist Reinterpretation". Journal of Economic Issues. 49 (1): 143–156. doi:10.1080/00213624.2015.1013884. ISSN 0021-3624. JSTOR 26605896. S2CID 153666053.
