= Nyaicili Boki Raja =

Dona Isabel Nyaicili Boki Raja

Regent of Ternate
- Reign: 1545–1546
- Predecessor: Hairun
- Successor: Hairun
- Died: post 1556
- Father: Al-Mansur of Tidore
- Religion: Islam, Christianity

Nyaicili Boki Raja (died after 1556) was a Queen of Ternate in Maluku Islands who served as regent of the kingdom in 1545-1546. She was later baptized by the Catholic missionary Francis Xavier and took the name Dona Isabel. Being the daughter, wife, sister and mother of kings, she had a potentially bridge-building function between the competing Malukan spice Sultanates Ternate and Tidore, but was repeatedly sidelined by the brutal policy of early European colonialism in Maluku.

== Dynastic position ==
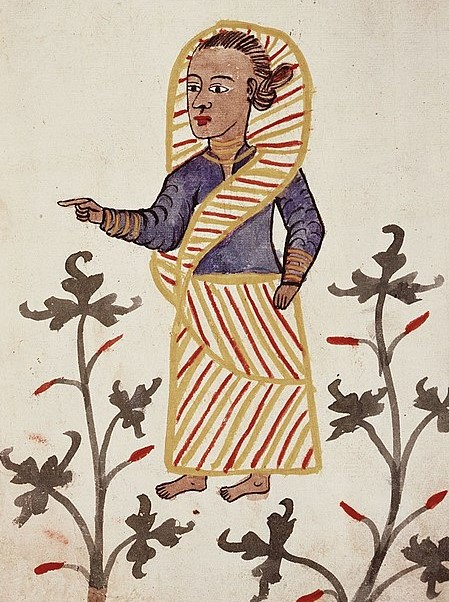
A high-status woman from North Maluku, from Codice Casanatense, c. 1540.

Her original name is not known, since Nyaicili Boki Raja (Naychile Puka Raga) is a title meaning "Junior Lady Royal Princess". She was a daughter of Sultan al-Mansur of Tidore (d. 1526) and married Sultan Bayan Sirrullah of Ternate some time prior to 1518. Ideas about her position in the Ternate dynasty differ among historians. Paramita R. Abdurrachman believes that she was the mother of three sons who became Sultans of Ternate in turn: Boheyat (r. 1521-1529), Dayal (r. 1529-1533) and Tabariji (r. 1533-1535). On the other hand, Christiaan van Fraassen posits that Bayan Sirrullah married two daughters of al-Mansur, of which the second gave birth to Tabariji. What is known from European sources is that Bayan Sirrullah died in 1521 by poison, leaving only minor sons by his main consort(s). Their elder half-brother Darwis acted as regent for the young Boheyat while the Queen Mother was his tutor. With her father in Tidore in her back, she was a most influential person. In fact, Al-Mansur entertained ideas to bring both Tidore and Ternate under Spanish protection which would reserve a dominant role for himself. However, Ternate had a strong alliance with the Portuguese from Melaka, who cooperated with Darwis and built a fort on the island in 1522-1523. Relations between the Queen Mother and Darwis were consequently rocky, and the Portuguese captain in Ternate took her sons into custody, causing her to flee to her father in Tidore for a while. Her influence moreover diminished when her father was poisoned to death in 1526. Boheyat died in 1529 without ever actually rule, and the Portuguese installed Dayal as king. By now the Portuguese officers and soldiers had evoked general resentment. In the middle of a political crisis in 1533, Dayal fled to his maternal uncle Mir of Tidore, leaving the throne vacant.

== Tabariji and Nyaycili ==
A boy of 14–15 years, Tabariji, was now enthroned with his mother Nyaicili Boki Raja as guardian. She had previously remarried with the nobleman and jogugu (first minister) Pati Serangi and is described as a shrewd woman who cultivated a deep knowledge of the Muslim religion. The arrogant behaviour of the Portuguese officers in Ternate did not improve. Captain Tristão d'Ataide, perhaps sensing that Nyaicili was too powerful and prestigious, arrested her in 1535 on allegations of treason. Together with her husband, son and a number of ministers with their retinues, she was brought aboard a ship and exiled to Goa in 1535. The group stayed in Portuguese India under meager conditions during the next years. Tabariji befriended a Portuguese official Jordão de Freitas and turned a Christian under his influence, receiving the name Dom Manuel. He dressed in Portuguese fashion, spoke good Portuguese and received many sympathies. When Freitas became captain of the Ternate fort in 1544 he saw it that Tabariji was recalled from his Indian exile, while the current Sultan Hairun was arrested and dethroned on dubious grounds. However, when the party stopped over in Melaka, Tabariji suddenly died in June 1545, and Nyaicili suspected that he had been poisoned. In his testament he named the King of Portugal as the heir to the Ternate kingdom. The next day the exiled Sultan Hairun arrived to Melaka as well. Though his rival was now out of the picture, he preferred to proceed to Goa to be officially exonerated by the Viceroy.

== Regent and Christian convert ==
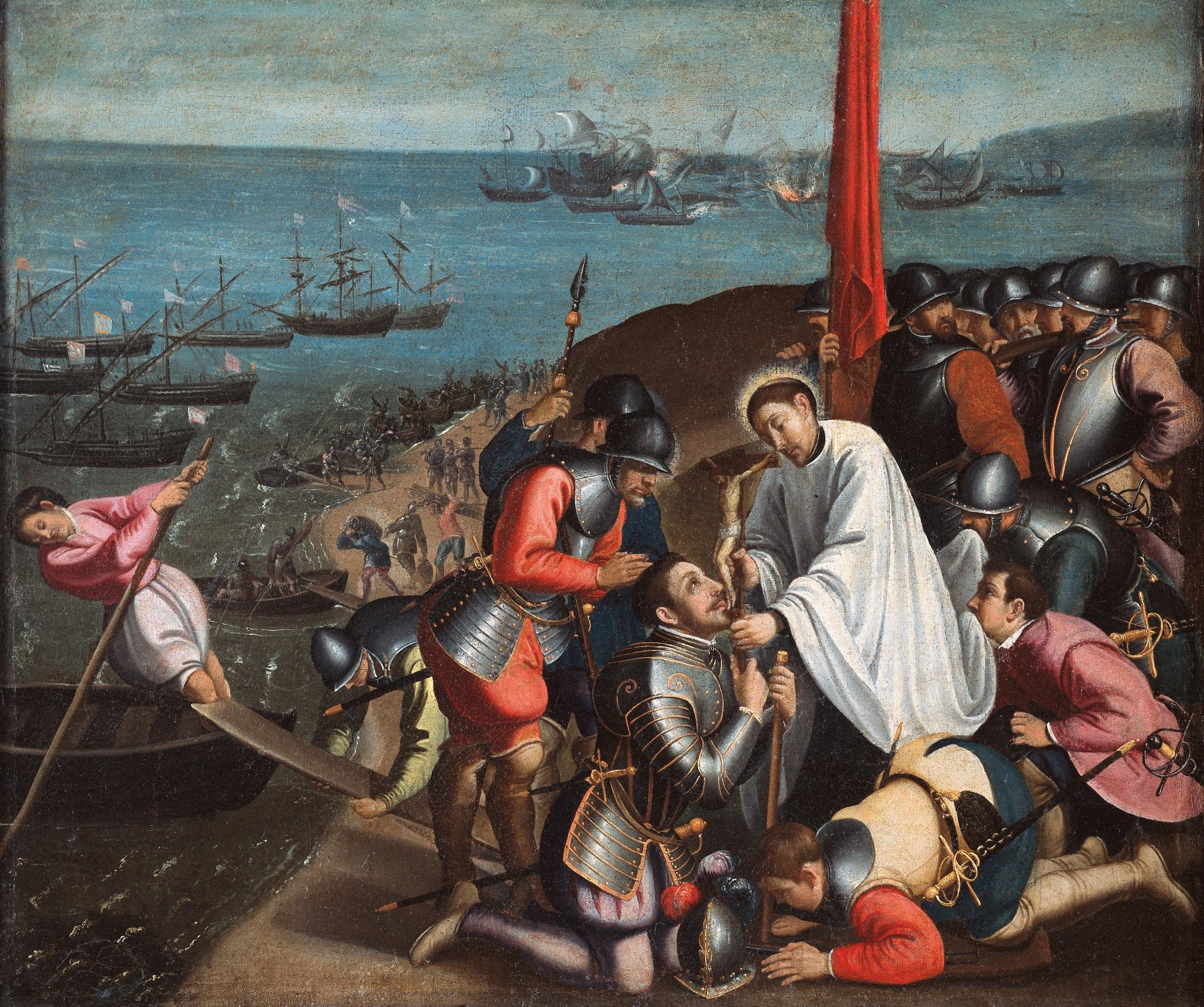
Francis Xavier inspiring Portuguese soldiers in the East Indies.

Nyaicili Boki Raja returned to the kingless Ternate in 1545 together with her husband Pati Sarangi. Captain Jordão de Freitas summoned the ministers of the court and read out Tabariji's testament. He proclaimed himself governor in the name of King John III while Nyaicili functioned as ruler for the time being. In the next year already, Freitas took over ruling powers from her, and she and her spouse stayed in the house of Baltasar Veloso who had married a Ternate princess. Though she was reputed to be a greater expert on the Qur'an than anyone else in Maluku, her years in Goa had made her susceptible to Christianity. During the stay of the renowned missionary Francis Xavier in Ternate in 1546, she took baptism and adopted the new name Dona Isabel - in fact the only personal name under which she is known. This caused quite a sensation among the population, and it was hoped by missionaries that her example would cause mass conversion to Catholicism. However, this turned out to be vain hope, and the returning Sultan Hairun remained a Muslim, although initially moderate. At arrival, Hairun immediately reconciled with Nyaicili. Little is known about Nyaicili after her conversion. She did not receive any appanage, and Francis Xavier wrote to the Portuguese authorities on her behalf to secure an allowance for her. She is last mentioned in a letter from 1556 where her virtuous practices are praised. In conclusion, according to Paramita Abdurrachman, "Meant to be the bridge between two ambitious powers, Tidore and Ternate, personified for her personality by her father and husband, this dream could not be materialized... Thus, she could only have disappeared in history, not remembered by anyone, not even in the local lore, and only sporadically mentioned in Portuguese documents".

== See also ==
- List of rulers of Maluku
- Sultanate of Ternate
- Tidore Sultanate

Nyaicili Boki Raja
Preceded by Hairun	Regent of Ternate; 1545–1546	Succeeded by Hairun
