= Munggu Antan inscription =

887 CE Sanskrit-language stone stele inscription

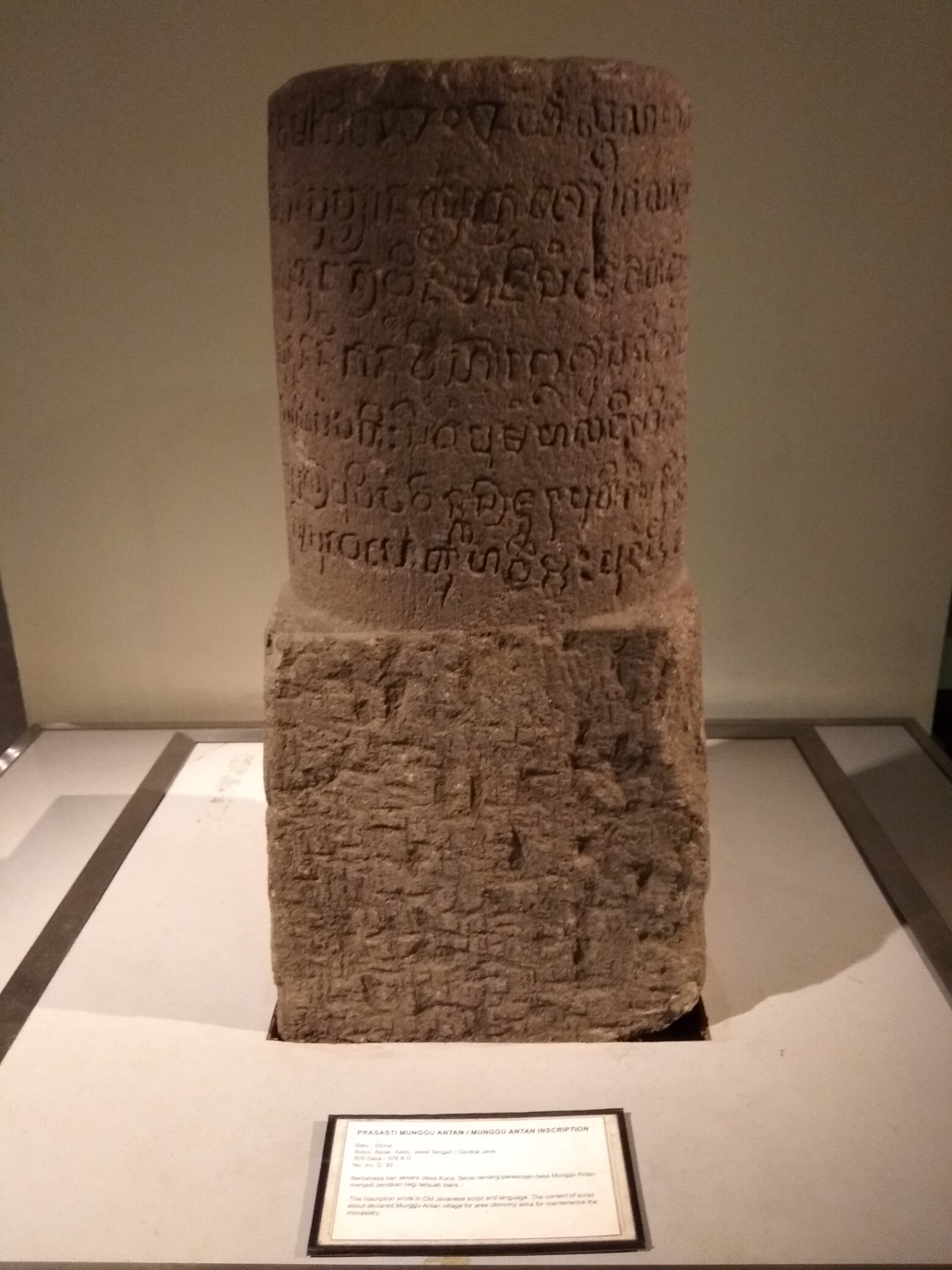
Munggu Antan inscription. Collection of National Museum of Indonesia.

Munggu Antan is an inscription in the Old Javanese language in the form of a stone stele found in the village of Bulus, Purworejo Regency, which was once included in the Kedu Residency (now in Central Java, Indonesia). This inscription contains the designation of the village Munggu Antan as a sima (a revenue-diverted area), becoming the domain of a Buddhist monastery (vihāra) in Gusali. This inscription was issued on 9 February 887 by the official (sang pamegat) of Munggu and his younger sister Sang Hadyan Palutungan, who was also the wife of the 'deity who rests at Pastika' (a deceased king), at the behest of the reigning king Bhadra, lord of Gurunwangi. Only four days after this inscription was issued, King Bhadra is said to have fled the palace, ushering in a period of contested leadership that lasted until 894.

Currently the inscription is stored at the National Museum of Indonesia, with an inventory collection number D. 93.

== Transliteration ==
The first published transliteration of this inscription was by J.L.A. Brandes (1913). The improved reading by Titi Surti Nastiti (2018) is given here:

1. swasti śakawarṣatita 808 phalguṇamāsa trayodaśi śuklapakṣa wūrukuŋ kaliwu°an
2. br̥haspati wāra puṣyā nakṣatra śobhaṇa yoga tatkāla saŋ pamgat muṅgu mu°aŋ °arinira saŋ
3. hadyan palutuṅan binihaji saŋ dewata °iŋ pastika. sumusuk °ikeŋ wanu°a °i muṅgu °antan
4. śīmā punpunnana nikanaŋ wihāra °i gusali tapa haji puṅul saṅka ri śrī mahārāja rake guru
5. nwaṅi tatra śākṣī saŋ patiḥ siṅgaŋ pu maŋhalaŋi patih walahiṅan pu sḍaŋ. luwaŋ pu °amwarī. ma[ŋ]ḍaṅkapi pu senā
6. wahuta tumapal pu pidaŋ winkas juru pu tirī. gusti °i muṅgu °antan pu kiṇḍoŋ. kalaŋ pu śrīṣṭi huler
7. pu °ugrā winkas pu wepo tuha wĕrĕḥ pu °ugrī //

== Translation ==
R. Soekmono offered a partial translation, while Titi Surti Nastiti published the full translation given here:

1. Hail, the Śaka year expired, 808 years, the month of Phalguṇa, thirteenth day of the bright half of the month, on Thursday Wurukuŋ Kaliwuan,
2. Star: Puṣyā, yoga: Śobhana. At that time, Saŋ Pamgat Muṅgu and his younger sister [named] Saŋ
3. Hadyan Palutuṅan, spouse of the king who was buried in Pastika, marked out the boundaries of a land in Muṅgu Antan
4. a sīma owned by the monastery in Gusali [the] tapahaji [in the area of] Puṅgul bestowed by Śrī Mahārāja Rake Gurun-
5. waṅi. Witnesses thereof (are) saŋ patih from the (village) of Siṅgaŋ Pu Maŋhalaŋi, patih from the village of Walahiṅan Pu Sḍaŋ, (patih from the village) of Luwaŋ Pu Amwarī represented by Pu Senā,
6. wahuta from the (village) of Tumapal Pu Pidaŋ, winkas juru Pu Tirī, gusti from Muṅgu Antan Pu Kiṇḍoŋ, kalaŋ Pu Śrīṣṭi, huler
7. Pu Ugrā, winkas Pu Wepo, tuha wĕrĕh Pu Ugrī //

== See also ==
- Mataram kingdom
