= Al-Mansur of Tidore =

Al-Mansur

Sultan of Tidore
- Reign: before 1512-1526
- Predecessor: Ciri Leliatu
- Successor: Mir
- Died: 1526
- Father: Ciri Leliatu
- Religion: Islam

Sultan Al-Mansur (Jawi: سلطان المنصور;c. 1475 - 1526) was the second Sultan of Tidore in Maluku Islands, who reigned from at least 1512 until 1526. Certain legends associate him with the beginnings of Tidore's rule over the Papuan Islands and western New Guinea. During his reign the first visits by Portuguese and Spanish seafarers took place, which led to grave political and economic consequences for the societies of eastern Indonesia. Trying to preserve his realm in the face of Western encroachment, he finally fell victim to Portuguese enmity.

== Early years ==
Al-Mansur was, according to later historical tradition, the son of the first Muslim ruler of Tidore, Ciri Leliatu. He was named after Syekh Mansur, an Arab who persuaded his father to convert to Islam. As he later told Spanish visitors, his father had been killed during a journey to Buru Island, which was normally a dependency of the rivalling Sultanate of Ternate. An early impression of his kingdom, before the onset of European influence, is given by Tomé Pires's geographical work Suma Oriental (c. 1515). At this time al-Mansur had 2,000 men under his direct rule, of whom no more than 200 were Muslims. While the base for his power was the small Tidore Island, he was also the overlord of parts of the nearby islands Moti and Makian. Makian in particular was important as a port of call for merchants who came from other parts of maritime Asia to buy cloves. Tidore produced about 1,400 Bahar of cloves (1,400 x 180 kilo) annually. The Portuguese capture of the leading Southeast Asian trading center Melaka in 1511 led to a decrease in trade, and al-Mansur was anxious to establish trade with the Portuguese. According to Pires he was a man of good judgment.

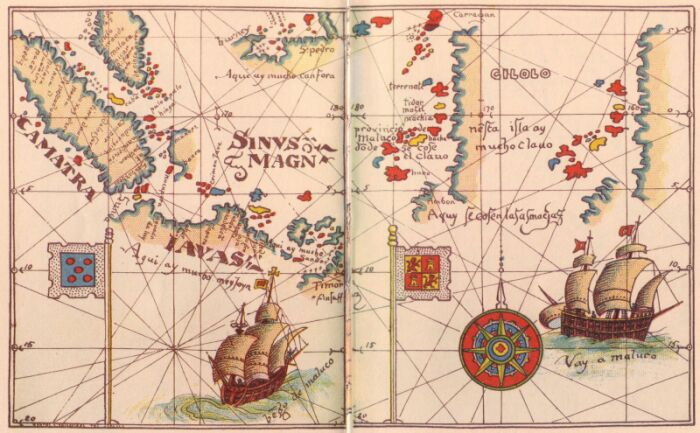
Map showing the claim that Maluku lay within the Spanish rather than Portuguese sphere of power, ostensibly justifying the actual Spanish arrival to Tidore in 1521.

== Arrival of Europeans ==
The potential profits of the trade in spices made the Portuguese equip an expedition to reach the Spice Islands soon after their conquest of Malacca. It arrived in Banda in 1512 and took in cargoes of spices. On the return trip, however, one of the boats was lost and the survivors made it to Ambon. The Sultans of Tidore and Ternate both sensed that they might profit on an alliance with the warlike strangers, and sent fleets to invite them. The Ternate squadron came first and escorted the Portuguese group to their ruler Bayan Sirrullah. This was the beginning of a Ternate-Portuguese strategic alliance that lasted with many twists and ruptures until 1570. Al-Mansur, in turn, received the Spanish Magellan expedition with open arms when it appeared in late 1521. Magellan had been killed in the Philippines some months earlier and the expedition was headed by João Lopes de Carvalho and Juan Sebastián Elcano. Al-Mansur regarded the Spanish as a potential counterweight against Ternate-Portugal, and assured them that they were expected since he had dreamt of the arrival of foreign ships. In his eagerness to bond the strangers he proclaimed that Tidore was to be renamed Castile and assured his devotion to the Spanish Crown. The travelogue of Antonio Pigafetta described the Sultan as a handsome man of about 45 years and a great astrologer. His dress consisted of a white shirt with gold-embroidered sleeves, a sarong reaching almost to the ground, and a silk headdress with a garland of flowers. He tied the various clans to him by means of taking one or two from each as co-wives. Al-Mansur's residence was a large house outside the main settlement where he stayed with a few hundred women.

The Spanish vessels took in cargoes of cloves and departed in December 1521. However, one of the ships foundered offshore, and its crew stayed on Tidore for some time. The remaining vessel Victoria made it back to Spain where the Tidorese spices yielded a profit that more than covered the costs for the expedition. However, no Spanish reinforcements arrived to Tidore in al-Mansur's lifetime, and the Tidorese were subjected to Portuguese political pressure. When the Portuguese Captain António de Brito arrived to Maluku in May 1522, he brusquely asked al-Mansur why he had bonded the Spanish although the region had been 'discovered' by the Portuguese. Al-Mansur now made various excuses, alleging that he had just received them as merchants and "for fear rather than willingly". The visit of the Spaniards was nevertheless the embryo for a Tidorese-Spanish cooperation that lasted with interruptions until 1663.

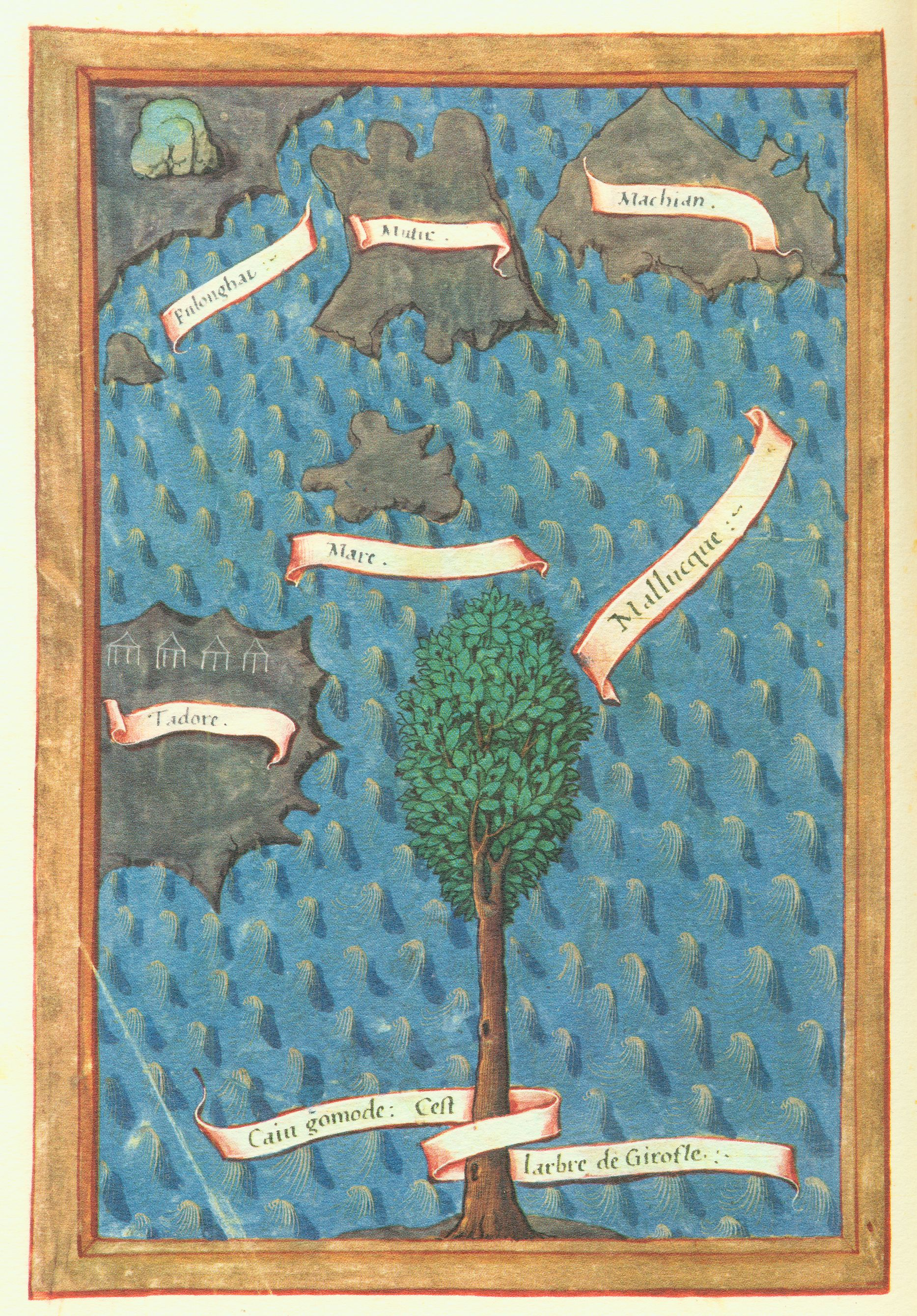
Antonio Pigafetta's map of Tidore and some other Malukan islands in 1521. To the right (west) of Tidore is a clove tree, kayu gaumedi.

== Legend of Gurabesi and the Raja Ampat ==
His father Ciri Leliatu is sometimes associated with the first expansion of Tidore's power into the territories inhabited by Papuans. However, an alternative legend dates this to al-Mansur. According to this version, a vassal chief (Sangaji) in Halmahera encountered an outstanding war chief called Gurabesi in Waigeo, one of the Raja Ampat (Papuan Islands). Enjoined by the Sangaji, Gurabesi travelled with his men to Tidore where he was cordially greeted by the Sultan and performed outstanding feats in war against Ternate. He received a daughter of al-Mansur, Boki Taebah, in marriage and returned to Waigeo. Ten years later al-Mansur, who wondered what had become of his daughter and wished to expand his small realm, headed an expedition to the east. At Waigeo he reunited with Gurabesi and went with him to the mainland of New Guinea with a large host of men. As the expedition proceeded, local men of prominence were summoned to become officials under the Tidore Sultanate, with titles such as Sangaji and Kimelaha. On his return to Tidore, al-Mansur stopped in Waigeo and made his grandchildren rulers of the Raja Ampat ("Four Kings"): Waigeo, Salawati, Waigama and Misool. There are a few variants of this story. The actual suzerainty of Tidore over the Papuan lands may however belong to a later age. A chief Gurabesi, coming out of Papua and acting on behalf of Sultan Tidore is moreover documented in 1649, suggesting that historical persons and events might have been mixed up by the legend.

== Matrimonial and warlike relations with Ternate ==
Tidore was one of four kingdoms that arose in North Maluku some time before the coming of Islam in the 15th century, the others being Ternate, Bacan and Jailolo. Ternate was usually the strongest power, though Tidore held a ritual precedence since Tidorese princesses were regularly married to Ternatan rulers and princes. Two daughters of al-Mansur were consorts of Sultan Bayan Sirrullah of Ternate. When Bayan Sirrullah died in 1521, his successors Boheyat, Dayal and Tabariji were grandsons of al-Mansur, and their mothers had a political role at the Ternate court.

The 1520s were nevertheless marked by spates of warfare between Tidore and Ternate, backed up by the Portuguese garrison that was stationed at the last-mentioned island. The Portuguese soon began to act as kingmakers in Ternate. Captain António de Brito took Sultan Boheyat and his Tidorese mother in custody and then attacked Tidore in 1524. After a few abortive raids, the Portuguese force and its Ternatan allies managed to land on the west side of Tidore. The strong fortress Marieko was taken by storm and many defenders were killed. The expedition proceeded to the clove-producing Makian where the villages under Tidorese rule submitted. Another vassal of Tidore, Gane on Halmahera resisted the Europeans furiously with their harpoons but were no match for the firearms of the Portuguese. Two years later al-Mansur was able to conclude peace with Captain Garcia Henriques on the condition that artillery pieces that the Tidorese had captured should be returned. However, Portuguese suspicions were raised by al-Mansur's offer to give a daughter to the Ternatan regent Kaicili Darwis, which might be detrimental to the European positions. As the Sultan lay sick at the time, Garcia Henriques sent a physician to the Tidore court, whose medicine hastened the demise of the ruler. He was succeeded by his adolescent son Mir (Amiruddin Iskandar Dulkarna'in), but his death immediately triggered new trouble with the Portuguese.

== Family ==
Sultan al-Mansur had at least 8 sons and 18 daughters, including:

- A daughter, married Sultan Bayan Sirrullah of Ternate, mother of Sultans Boheyat and Dayal
- Nyaicili Boki Raja, married Sultan Bayan Sirrullah of Ternate, mother of Sultan Tabariji
- Musahib
- Kaicili Rade
- Mir, Sultan of Tidore
- Munawari

Al-Mansur's widow, whose name is not known, had a relationship with the late ruler's servant Derrota, who gained large influence but was resented by the local aristocracy. When the Spanish arrived to Tidore in 1527 they assisted in killing Derrota, though the widowed queen apparently survived.

== See also ==
- List of rulers of Maluku
- Spice trade
- Sultanate of Tidore
- Sultanate of Ternate
- Magellan's circumnavigation

Al-Mansur of Tidore
Preceded by Ciri Leliatu	Sultan of Tidore before 1512-1526	Succeeded by Mir
