= Ciri Leliatu =

Sultan of Tidore
- Reign: late 15th century/early 16th century
- Predecessor: Matagena
- Successor: Al-Mansur
- Died: before 1512
Regnal name
- Sultan Jamaluddin
- Father: Matagena
- Religion: Islam

Ciri Leliatu (Ciriliyati) (Jawi: چلياتي); or Sultan Jamaluddin (سلطان جمال الدين; fl. late 15th/early 16th century) was the first Sultan of Tidore in Maluku Islands, who reigned at a time when Islam made advances in this part of Indonesia because of contacts brought about by the increased trade in spices. He is also sometimes credited with the first Tidorese contacts with the Papuan Islands.

== The coming of Islam ==
Ciri Leliatu is only known from relatively late historical traditions. According to these, the four North Malukan kingdoms Ternate, Tidore (Duko), Bacan and Jailolo were founded by the four sons of the Arab Jafar Sadik. The son who inherited Tidore, Sahjati, was followed by seven rulers with the title Kolano. The last of them was Matagena who, according to the chronicle Hikayat Ternate, was a Malay lord who expelled his predecessor Kolano Sele and acquired kingship over the island. According to even later sources, he was descended from a line of Muslim qadis and thus started a new royal lineage, and eventually died in Gotowasi village in Halmahera. He is nevertheless counted among the pre-Islamic rulers. Matagena's son was Ciri Leliatu, also called Ciriliyati, who succeeded to the Kolano-ship in the late 15th century. An Arab called Syekh Mansur came to Tidore and converted him to Islam, whereby he received the Islamic name Sultan Jamaluddin. The eldest son of the king was named after the preacher, and later succeeded his father as Sultan al-Mansur.

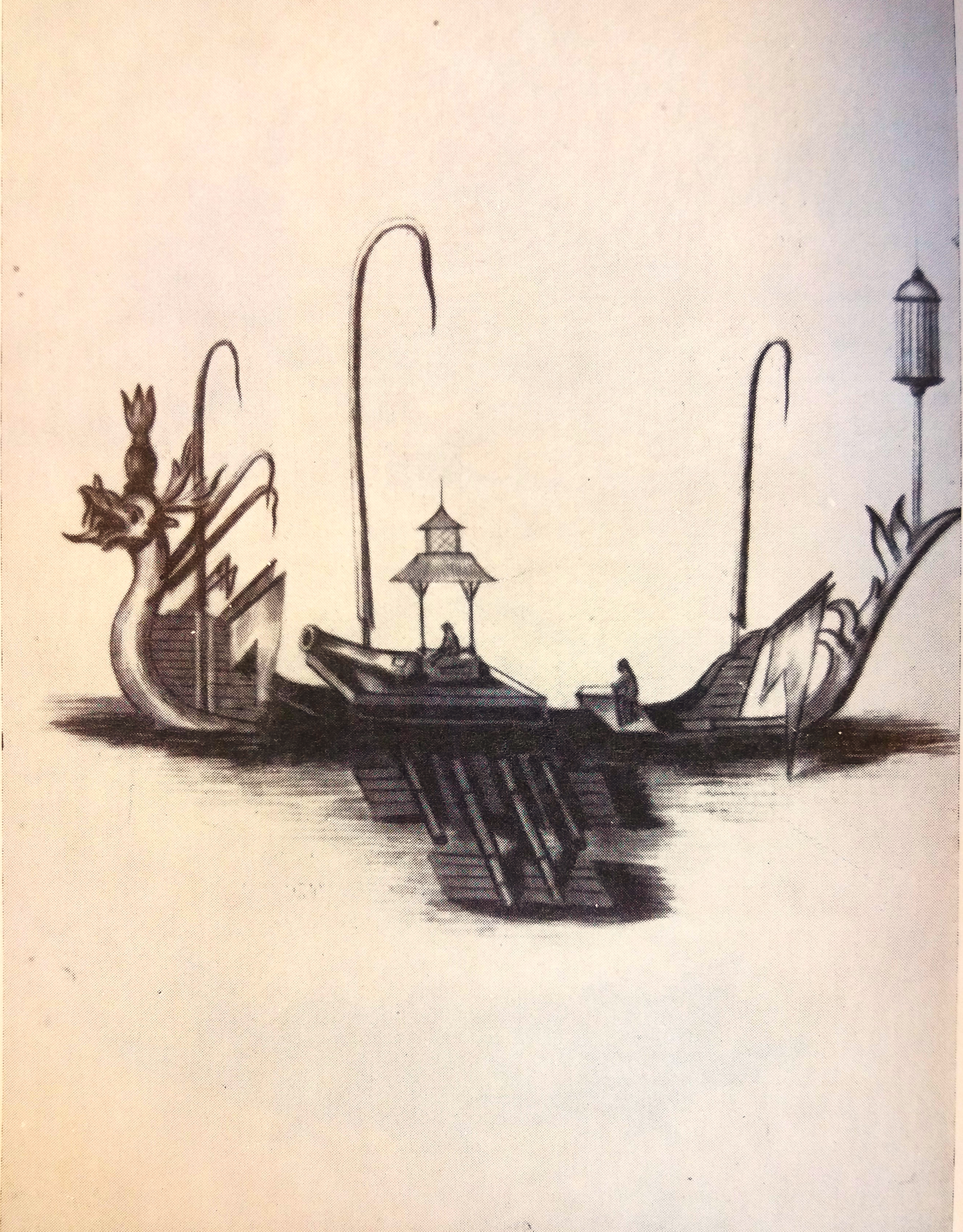
A Malukan kora kora (large outrigger for warfare) in a manuscript from the 16th century.

There are, however variants of the conversion story. The Ambonese chronicle Hikayat Tanah Hitu, written in the 17th century, says that the key figure was Mahadum, who was the son of a Sultan of Samudra Pasai. Mahadum performed missionary work in several places in Indonesia, successively travelling to the east. From the Banda Islands he proceeded to Jailolo on Halmahera whose king he converted and gave the name Yusuf. From there he went to the nearby Tidore Island and won its ruler for Islam. The converted king is here called Ismail, who showed great favours to Mahadum and gave him the princess Syamai as wife. From this marriage a son Syuku was born. Finally the Kolano of Ternate heard about Mahadum and invited him to his island, letting himself be converted under the name Zainal Abidin. Mahadum died in Ternate and his son Syuku was married to Zainal Abidin's daughter. European sources from the 16th century confirm that a wave of Islamic conversions took place in the North Malukan kingdoms in the second half of the 15th century, since many Muslim merchants from India, Java and the Malay world came there to trade in cloves which grew abundantly in Tidore.

== Contact with the Papuans ==
Tidorese traditions associate Ciri Leliatu with the first political expansion towards the Papuan Islands and the coast of New Guinea. The island of Gebe east of Halmahera was an important realm with authority over part of the Papuans. It was densely populated and could bode up 500 boats. Ciri Leliatu started a war against Gebe on the pretext that the Gebenese had raided in his territories. He was assisted by auxiliaries from the Halmaheran places Maba, Weda and Patani and was completely successful in defeating and subordinating Gebe. A treaty was made, whereby the Sultan of Tidore was acknowledged as overlord over Gebe and by extension the Papuan lands. Gebe, however, received a share in profits in forest products coming from Papua, and Tidorese decrees concerning Papua had to pass via the Gebe chiefs. Again there are variants of the story, since some versions date the beginnings of Tidore-Papua relations to the next ruler al-Mansur. From other materials it is evident that there were indeed early relations with Papua. Studies of pottery trade show that ceramic wares from Mare Island, adjacent to Tidore, were exported to Papuan lands since at least the 15th century and bartered for foodstuff that was needed in the resource-scarce North Maluku. However, historical sources from the 16th and early 17th century suggest that another Malukan sultanate, Bacan, was the first to have a political relation with Papua. The power of Tidore in these quarters is only documented in the 17th century.

== Death ==
Ciri Leliatu's rule is sometimes approximately dated in 1495–1512. He is not mentioned by name in any early European source. However, the remnants of the Magellan expedition met the next ruler al-Mansur in 1521–22. Al-Mansur told the Europeans that his father had been slain by the local population when he went to Buru Island, and that his body had been unceremoniously thrown into the sea. The Sultan therefore wanted European assistance to take revenge on the Burunese, which was a factor in the strategical alliance between the Spanish and Tidore that lasted until 1663. Buru was otherwise within Ternate's sphere of interest.

== See also ==
- List of rulers of Maluku
- Spice trade
- Tidore Sultanate
- Sultanate of Ternate

Ciri Leliatu
Preceded by Matagena	Sultan of Tidore late 15th/early 16th century	Succeeded by Al-Mansur
