= Paramita Abdurachman =

Indonesian historian and social worker

Paramita Rahayu Abdurachman (Indonesian pronunciation: [paraˌmit̪a raˌhaju abduˈraxman], 29 February 1920 – 24 March 1988), also known as Jo Abdurachman, was an Indonesian historian and social worker who served as the secretary-general of the Indonesian Red Cross Society for nearly a decade. After her retirement from the organization, she became a researcher at the Indonesian Institute of Sciences, studying the history of the Maluku Islands using Spanish and Portuguese colonial archives.

== Biography ==
Paramita Rahayu was born in Buitenzorg (Bogor), in the former Dutch East Indies (Indonesia), on 29 February 1920. Her father was Raden Adipati Ario Abdoerachman, who was appointed the bupati (regent) of the European colonial settlement of Meester Cornelis in 1925, and her mother was Siti Katidjah, who was born to a Javanese priyayi family. Paramita's family of bureaucrats held a higher position in society and had access to Western education, allowing her to attend an HBS secondary school typically reserved for the Indonesian elite. She was the niece of Achmad Soebardjo, Indonesia's first foreign minister, and the cousin of journalist Herawati Diah and archeologist Satyawati Suleiman.
