= Cornelis Tiele =

Dutch theologian and religious scholar (1830 – 1902)

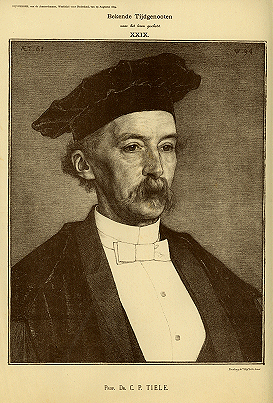

Cornelis Petrus Tiele (16 December 1830 – 11 January 1902) was a Dutch theologian and scholar of religions.

== Life ==
Tiele was born at Leiden. He was educated at Amsterdam, first studying at the Athenaeum Illustre, as the communal high school of the capital was then named, and afterwards at the seminary of the Remonstrant Brotherhood.

He was destined for the pastorate in his own brotherhood. After steadily declining for a considerable period, this had increased its influence in the second half of the 19th century by widening the tenets of the Dutch Methodists, which had caused many of the liberal clergy among the Lutherans and Calvinists to go over to the Remonstrants. Tiele had liberal religious views himself, which he early enunciated from the pulpit, as Remonstrant pastor of Moordrecht (1853) and at Rotterdam (1856).

Upon the removal of the seminary of the brotherhood from Amsterdam to Leiden in 1873, Tiele was appointed one of its leading professors. In 1877 followed his appointment at the University of Leiden as professor of the history of religions, a chair specially created for him.

With Abraham Kuenen and J. H. Scholten, amongst others, he founded the "Leiden school" of modern theology. From 1867 he assisted Kuenen, A. D. Loman and L. W. Rauwenhoff in editing the Theologisch Tijdschrift. In 1889 he became a member of the Teylers Eerste Genootschap. In 1901, he resigned his professorship at Leiden University, and died in January 1902.

Tiele is said to have had a strong work ethic and vast knowledge of ancient languages, peoples and religions, upon which, according to F. Max Müller, he shed a new and vivid light.

== Works ==
Of his many learned works, the Vergelijkende geschiedenis van de egyptische en mesopotamische Godsdiensten (1872), and the Geschiedenis van den Godsdienst (1876; new ed. 1891), have been translated into English, the former by James Ballingall (1878–1882), the latter by Joseph Estlin Carpenter (1877) under the title Outlines of the History of Religion (French translation, 1885; German translation, 1895). A French translation of the Comparative History was published in 1882.

Other works by Tiele are:

- De Godsdienst van Zarathustra, van het Ontstaan in Baktrie, tot den Val van het Oud-Perzische Rijk (1864) a work now embodied, but much enlarged and improved by the latest researches of the author, in the History of Religions (vol. ii, part ii, Amsterdam, 1901), a part which of appeared only a short time before the author's death
- De Vrucht der Assyriologie voor de vergelijkende geschiedenis der Godsdiensten (1877; German ed., 1878)
- Babylonisch-assyrische Geschichte (two parts, Leipzig, 1886–1888)
- Western Asia, according to the most Recent Discoveries (London, 1894).

He was also a contributor to the Encyclopaedia Biblica, and the writer of the article "Religions" in the 9th edition of the Encyclopædia Britannica (1875).

A volume of Tiele's sermons appeared in 1865, and a collection of his poems in 1863. He also edited (1868) the poems of Petrus Augustus de Genestet. In his time, Tiele was best known to English students by his Outlines and the Gifford Lectures On the Elements of the Science of Religion, delivered in 1896–1898 at Edinburgh University. They appeared simultaneously in Dutch at Amsterdam, in English in London and Edinburgh (1897–1899, 2 vols).

== Universal religions ==
Tiele was an early proponent of the Dutch school of "science of religion", and proposed that religion is a psychological phenomenon and one of the most profound needs of human beings. Tiele categorized and studied religions as Nature and Ethical religions, a concept that George Galloway contested in 1920 because in practice such a distinction is difficult to draw.

Tiele has also been credited as the founder of the Dutch school of the comparative studies of religions, his influence suggested to be as significant as Max Muller. He was the first professor in The Netherlands to hold a chair in such studies after the Dutch government established this position in 1876. Tiele proposed that religions develop in phases, from being nature religions, to becoming mythological religions, then doctrinal religions, and ultimately as world or universal religions. The last stage holds "holy awe", "looking up to God as the Most High" and "belonging to the adored one forever, in life and in death". In these categories, Tiele in 1877 placed Buddhism, Christianity, and Islam as universal religions. Later studies and a better understanding of Buddhism has discredited some of the premises of Tiele's theory. Buddhism, like a few other Indian religions, is essentially a non-theistic religion and it does not suggest its followers to belong to a God in Buddhism or to "look up to God as the Most High".

== Honours ==
Tiele was elected an International Member of the American Philosophical Society in 1898. Edinburgh University in 1900 conferred upon Tiele the degree of D.D. honoris causa, an honor bestowed upon him previously by the universities of Dublin and Bologna. He was also a fellow of at least fifteen learned societies in the Netherlands, Belgium, France, Germany, Italy, Great Britain, and the United States.

== Family ==
Pieter Anton Tiele was his brother.

== Selected bibliography ==
- (in English) C.P. Tiele: Comparative history of the Egyptian and Mesopotamian religions. History of the Egyptian religion. London, Routledge, 2000. ISBN 0-415-24461-7 (Repr. of the ed. Trübner & Co., 1882)
- (in English) C.P. Tiele: Elements of the science of religion. New York, AMS Press, 1979 (2 vols.). ISBN 0-404-60480-3 (Repr. of the 1897-1899 ed. published by W. Blackwood, Edinburgh)
- (in English) C.P. Tiele: The religion of the Iranian peoples. Bombay, 1912
- (in English) Religious systems of the world. A contribution to the study of comparative religion. A collection of addresses delivered at South Place Institute. [By C.P. Tiele ... et al.]. Various editions, between 1892 & 1911
- (in English) C.P. Tiele: Outlines of the history of religion to the spread of the universal religions. London, Trübner, 1877
