= Bayan Sirrullah =

Sultan of Ternate
- Reign: 1500?–1521
- Predecessor: Zainal Abidin
- Successor: Boheyat
- Died: 1521
Regnal name
- Abu Lais
- Father: Zainal Abidin
- Religion: Islam

Bayan Sirrullah (Jawi: بيان سرالله; died 1521) was the second Sultan of Ternate in Maluku. He is also known as Abu Lais (ابو ليث; in Portuguese sources, Boleife) or Kaicili Leliatu (کچيل للياتو). He ruled from perhaps 1500 to 1521 and is important as the first east Indonesian ruler who made contact with the encroaching Portuguese.

== Historical position ==
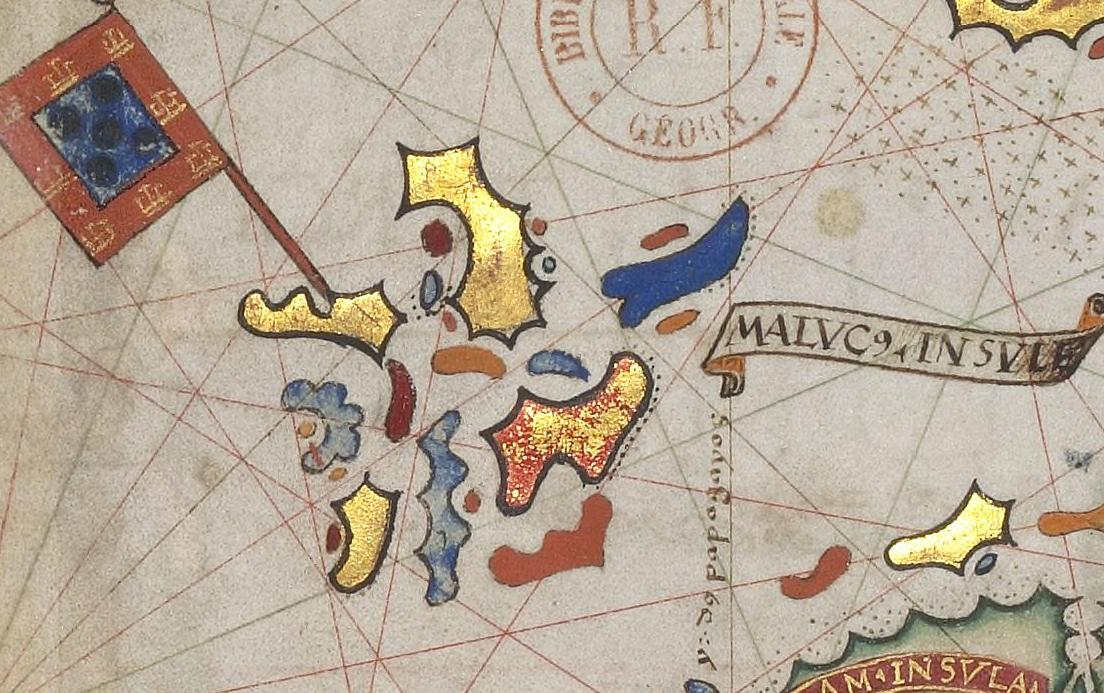
The islands of North Maluku on an early map from c. 1519, with the Portuguese banner planted on what is likely Ternate.

Bayan Sirrullah was the eldest son of the first Sultan of Ternate, Zainal Abidin, and a woman from soa Marsaoli. According to a later account, his reign started in the year 1500. Islam had been accepted by the local elites of North Maluku in the second half of the 15th century, as a consequence of the importance of Muslim traders in the archipelago. Ternate was an important center for the trade in cloves, and was transformed from a traditional domain under a Kolano (king) into a sultanate with selective Islamic features. Bayan Sirrullah is, in fact, the first ruler who is known from contemporary sources. According to the Portuguese writer Tomé Pires (c. 1515), Ternate was the most important power in Maluku at the time. The other three kingdoms in the region were Tidore, Bacan and Jailolo. The kings were all related to each other. Other sources show that the ruler of Tidore had a precedence position vis-à-vis Ternate, since his daughters were regularly married with Ternatan Sultans and princes; in spite if that, Tidore was usually the weaker of the two. Another contemporary writer, Duarte Barbosa (c. 1518), asserts that Bayan Sirrullah "was formerly king of all five [islands of Maluku], but now the four have risen against him and are independent".

Pires describes Bayan Sirrullah ("Bem Acorala") as a good man with a sound judgment who kept the subjects in obedience. He had a large number of co-wives, daughters of the various grandees of the kingdom, apparently as a way to bind the aristocracy to his person. Ternate, though not offering an excellent harbor, was an important center for trade. Pires relates that 150 bahar (150 x 180 kilo) were exported per year, and that some foreign merchants stayed on the island. Ternate was rich in foodstuff, though much foodstuff arrived from other parts of Maluku. A lot of trade goods passed via Ternate: iron utensils from Banggai, parrots from Morotai, white parrots from Ceram, gold from other islands. Textiles from India were in demand.

== First contact with the Portuguese ==
The Portuguese were established in the vital trading entrepot Melaka in 1511, and immediately made plans to reach the fabled Spice Islands in order to secure the sources of spice production. A first expedition arrived to Maluku in 1512 and bought a cargo of nutmeg and cloves in the Banda Islands. On the return trip one of the boats, under Francisco Serrão, capsized. After some adventures seven or eight survivors were brought to Ambon where their military outfit made an impression. The rival sultans of Ternate and Tidore heard about the castaways; both were interested in inviting the white strangers to help them expand their power in the region. Ternate came first as Bayan Sirrullah sent his brother Kaicili Vaidua to invite Serrão's party to Ternate. The Europeans were cordially received on arrival, and the Sultan promised to deliver the cloves to the Portuguese, provided that they would build a fortress on Ternate. At this stage it was considered a mutually advantageous alliance: Portugal backed the strongest power in the region to control the spice trade, while their superior military equipment and large vessels would deter Ternate's enemies. Bayan Sirrullah was considered a great oracle, who had predicted that men of iron would one day come and extend his realm.

With all this in mind, Bayan Sirrullah dictated two official letters in 1514, one to King Manuel I of Portugal and the other to the captain of Melaka. In these, he offered formal vassalage under Manuel. The great role of Melaka as a trading entrepot made the market in spices dependent on shipping to and from this place, which made it desirable to have a stable diplomatic relation with the Estado da India, the Portuguese colonial organization in Asian waters. But he also put forward the idea that one ruler would be sufficient for the Malukan area, rather than the traditional quadripartition into four kingdoms. In other words, he expected the Portuguese to back his power ambitions and upset the precolonial order. To this end he dispatched his son Kaicili Latu as envoy to Melaka in the same year. Latu stayed in Melaka for six months and apparently visited other places afterwards, returning to Ternate only after the death of his father.

Francisco Serrão stayed in Ternate for the remainder of his life, and was a close advisor to Bayan Sirrullah. His letters about the Spice islands to his kinsman and friend Ferdinand Magellan, forwarded via Melaka, helped inspire Magellan's plans for the first circumnavigation of the globe. Ironically, Magellan was killed in the Philippines around the same time as Serrão died in Ternate, allegedly poisoned. When the remnants of his expedition arrived to Maluku in late 1521, Bayan Sirrullah had died as well, supposedly poisoned by his own daughter whose husband, the Sultan of Bacan, had been ill-treated by his father-in-law. He was succeeded by his young son Boheyat, but the Portuguese grip over Ternate was soon to cause resentment and conflicts.

== Family ==
Bayan Sirrullah had numerous wives and co-wives, including:

- A daughter of Sultan al-Mansur of Tidore, mother of Boheyat and Dayal
- Nyaicili Boki Raja, daughter of Sultan al-Mansur of Tidore, mother of Tabariji
- A Javanese lady, mother of Hairun
- Another Javanese lady, mother of Darwis and Momole

The Sultan had the following known children:

- Boheyat, Sultan of Ternate 1521–1529
- Dayal, Sultan of Ternate 1529–1533
- Tabariji, Sultan of Ternate 1533–1535
- Hairun, Sultan of Ternate 1535–1570
- Latu
- Momole
- Gujarati
- Tidore Wonge
- Darwis, regent of Ternate 1521–1530
- Mansur
- Gapi Baguna
- Katara
- Paji
- Wayiku
- Ungumira
- Raja Jali
- Tiana
- Raja-ma-Bunga
- Bima
- Duko Lamo
- Sambuangan
- A daughter, married Sultan Alauddin I of Bacan
- Dona Catharina, married the Sangaji of Moti, and later with Baltasar Veloso

== See also ==
- Spice trade
- List of rulers of Maluku
- Sultanate of Tidore
- Sultanate of Jailolo

Bayan Sirrullah
Preceded by Zainal Abidin	Sultan of Ternate; 1500?–1521	Succeeded by Boheyat
