= Tabariji of Ternate =

Tabariji

Sultan of Ternate
- Reign: 1533–1535
- Predecessor: Dayal
- Successor: Hairun
- Born: c. 1518
- Died: 20 October 1545 (aged 27); Melaka
- Father: Bayan Sirrullah
- Mother: Nyaicili Boki Raja
- Religion: Catholicism prev. Sunni Islam

Tabariji or Tabarija (c. 1518–1545) was the Sultan of Ternate in Maluku, whose realm also included Makian and other east Indonesian islands. He reigned from 1533 to 1535, when he was deposed by the dominant Portuguese and exiled to India. He later became a convert to Catholicism under the name Dom Manuel.

== Reign ==
Tabariji was the son of Sultan Bayan Sirrullah (also known as Abu Lais) and his first and primary wife, Nyaicili Boki Raja. Nyaicili was the daughter of the King of Tidore; her brother Mir ruled that kingdom after the death of their father in 1526, which gave her increased political leverage. The Portuguese had previously arrived from Melaka in order to secure the spice trade and built a fort on Ternate in 1522-1523. They soon came to dominate the Ternatan court and manipulated the succession. All this led to great resentment among the Ternatan elite. The Portuguese captain Vincente de Fonseca and the Ternatan regent Pati Sarangi planned to assassinate the boy king Dayal who however managed to flee to Tidore. Now Dayal's half-brother Tabariji was placed on the throne by Fonseca. His step-father Pati Sarangi acted as regent since the Sultan was barely 15 years old. After two years an incident occurred where Ternatan forces, opposing the interests of the Portuguese, attacked a newly Christianized settlement on Halmahera. This motivated the new captain Tristão de Ataide to depose Tabariji in favor of another half-brother, Hairun in 1535. The ex-sultan was exiled to the center of Portuguese power in Asia, Goa.

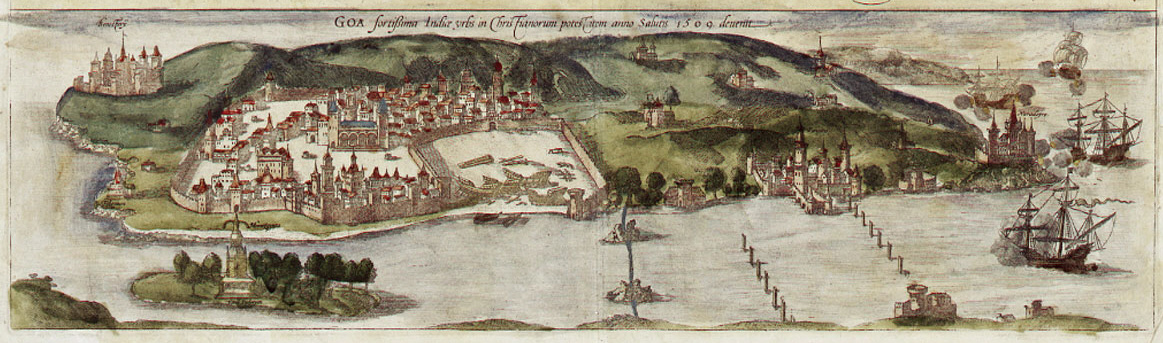
Portuguese Goa in the mid-16th century.

== Baptism and death ==
While in Goa he befriended the Portuguese official Jordão de Freitas who influenced him in his conversion to Catholic Christianity. His baptismal name was Dom Manuel which he henceforth used. In 1544 Freitas was appointed new captain in Ternate by the authorities in Goa. When he sailed for Southeast Asia to take up his new position, he brought Tabariji with him. The idea was to depose Sultan Hairun and reinstall Tabariji. With a Christian ruler over the leading Malukan kingdom, the conversion of Maluku would apparently be facilitated. Leaving Tabariji in Melaka, Freitas proceeded to Ternate where he imprisoned Hairun and the Kapita Laut (sea lord) Samarau and persuaded the notables of the kingdom to accept Tabariji back. Hairun was brought to Melaka, but just as he approached the city, Tabariji suddenly died on 20 October 1545. According to a rumour, Hairun had him poisoned. In his will he gave over his realm to the King of Portugal, including Ternate and the dependent islands and territories Moti, Makian, Kayoa and Moro. The will was later used by the Portuguese to argue that the Ternate rulers were their lawful vassals.

== Sources ==
- Moffett, Samuel Hugh (2014) A History of Christianity in Asia, Vol. 2. Orbis Press. ISBN 9781608331635.
- Taylor, Jean Gelman. Indonesia: peoples and histories. (New Haven: Yale University Press, 2004) p. 137.

Tabariji of Ternate
Preceded by Dayal	Sultan of Ternate; 1533–1535	Succeeded by Hairun
