= Dayal of Ternate =

Hidayatullah (Dayal)

Sultan of Ternate
- Reign: 1529–1533
- Predecessor: Boheyat
- Successor: Tabariji
- Born: c. 1515
- Died: December 1536 (aged 21); Tidore
- Father: Bayan Sirrullah
- Mother: Tidore princess
- Religion: Sunni Islam

Dayal also known as Hidayatullah (Jawi: هداية الله; c. 1515 – December 1536) was the fourth Sultan of Ternate in Maluku. He had a short and largely nominal reign between 1529 and 1533 before fleeing Ternate due to Portuguese pressure. He later tried to create an anti-Portuguese alliance among the kings in North Maluku, but was mortally wounded in battle against the Europeans.

== Hostage with the Portuguese ==
Dayal was the son of Sultan Bayan Sirrullah. His mother was a daughter of Sultan al-Mansur of Tidore. When his older full brother Boheyat died in 1529, Dayal was put on the throne. He was still adolescent, and his older half-brother Kaicili Darwis acted as regent. His time was characterized by increasing conflicts between the Ternatans and the Portuguese who kept a foot on the island and interfered indiscriminately in Ternatan politics. Like his brother before him, Dayal was kept as hostage in the fortress.

== Death of the regent ==
The Portuguese captain Jorge de Meneses was known to be a rude and arrogant figure who quickly antagonized the Ternatan elite. On one occasion his soldiers foraged in Tobona village without paying for what they took. The locals attacked the soldiers and killed some of them. Meneses, hearing this, ordered the Sangaji (local lord) of Tobona to be delivered to him. Kaicili Darwis complied and handed over the Sangaji and two village elders, but was shocked to see the Portuguese retaliation. The two elders had their hands cut off while Menese threw the Sangaji to his mastiffs. The delinquent rushed into the sea and was drowned, taking one of the dogs with him. This and similar events led to a conspiracy with the aim to expel the white foreigners, where the Sultan of Jailolo on Halmahera was involved. However, the plans leaked in the last minute through a Ternatan woman whose son had a Portuguese father. Meneses immediately arrested Kaicili Darwis and two other grandees. Although their guilt was in doubt, Darwis was executed in 1530.

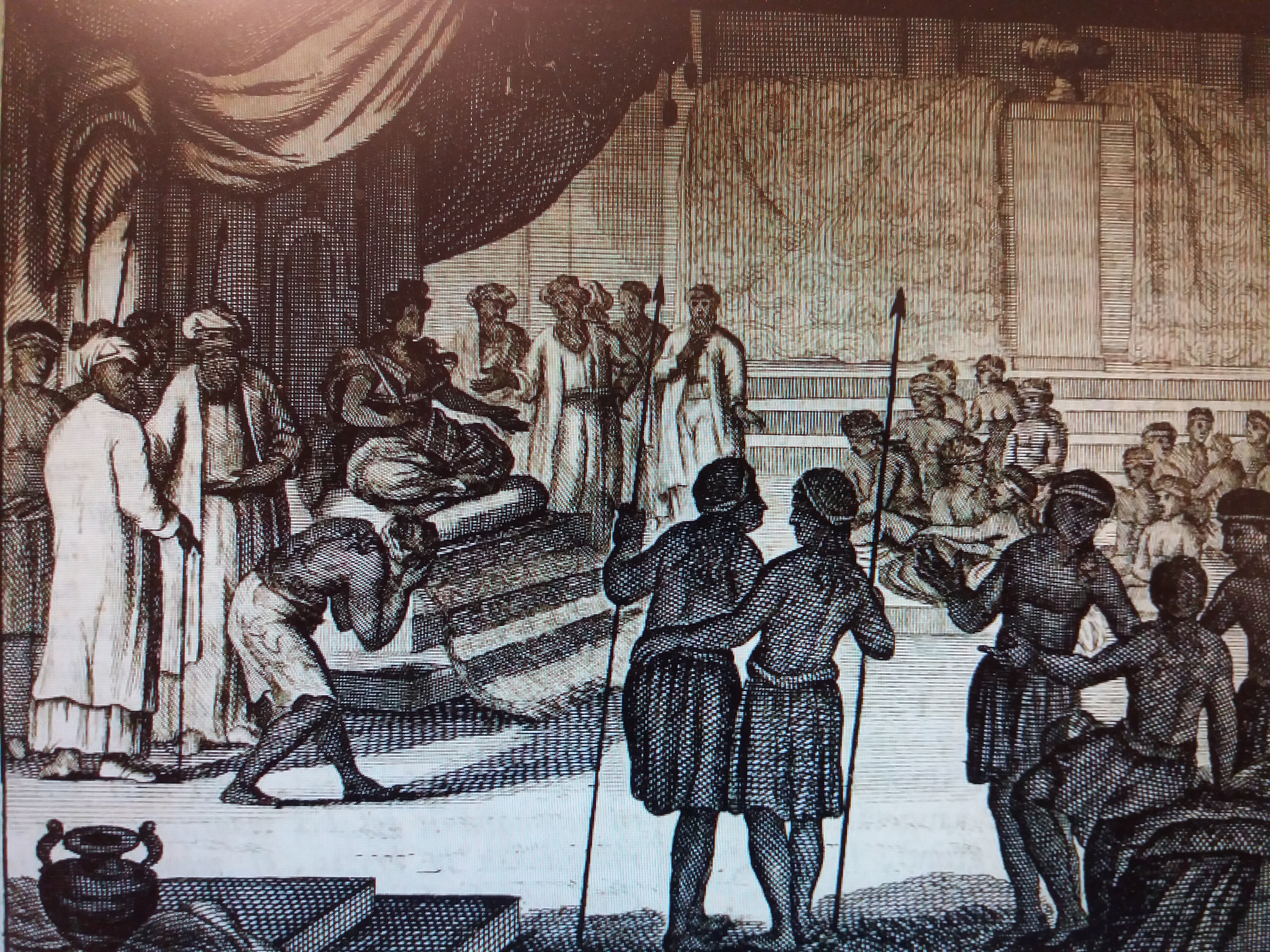
Dayal's mother speaks out about the Portuguese injustices, from François Valentijn, Oud en Nieuw Oost-Indien (1724).

== Revolt ==
However, the Queen Mother reacted by withdrawing to a fortified place on the island, and forbade the people to deliver foodstuff to the fortress. The siege ended when a new captain, Gonçalo Pereira arrived to Ternate, and a temporary reconciliation took place. Pereira did not behave much better than his predecessor, and a succession of new sieges of the Portuguese fort ensued. The Ternatans temporarily allied with Tidore, Bacan and the Papuan Islands to maintain the blockade. With no hope for relief, the Portuguese had to comply and agreed to release Sultan Dayal. Thus peace was restored, but the current captain Vicente de Fonseca began to plot with the Ternatan grandee Pati Sarangi to get rid of the young sultan. Apparently, Pati Sarangi hoped to gain the throne. The plans were discovered, however, and Dayal and his mother escaped to Tidore in 1533, where his uncle Sultan Mir ruled. He later proceeded to Jailolo at safe distance from the Portuguese.

== Death ==
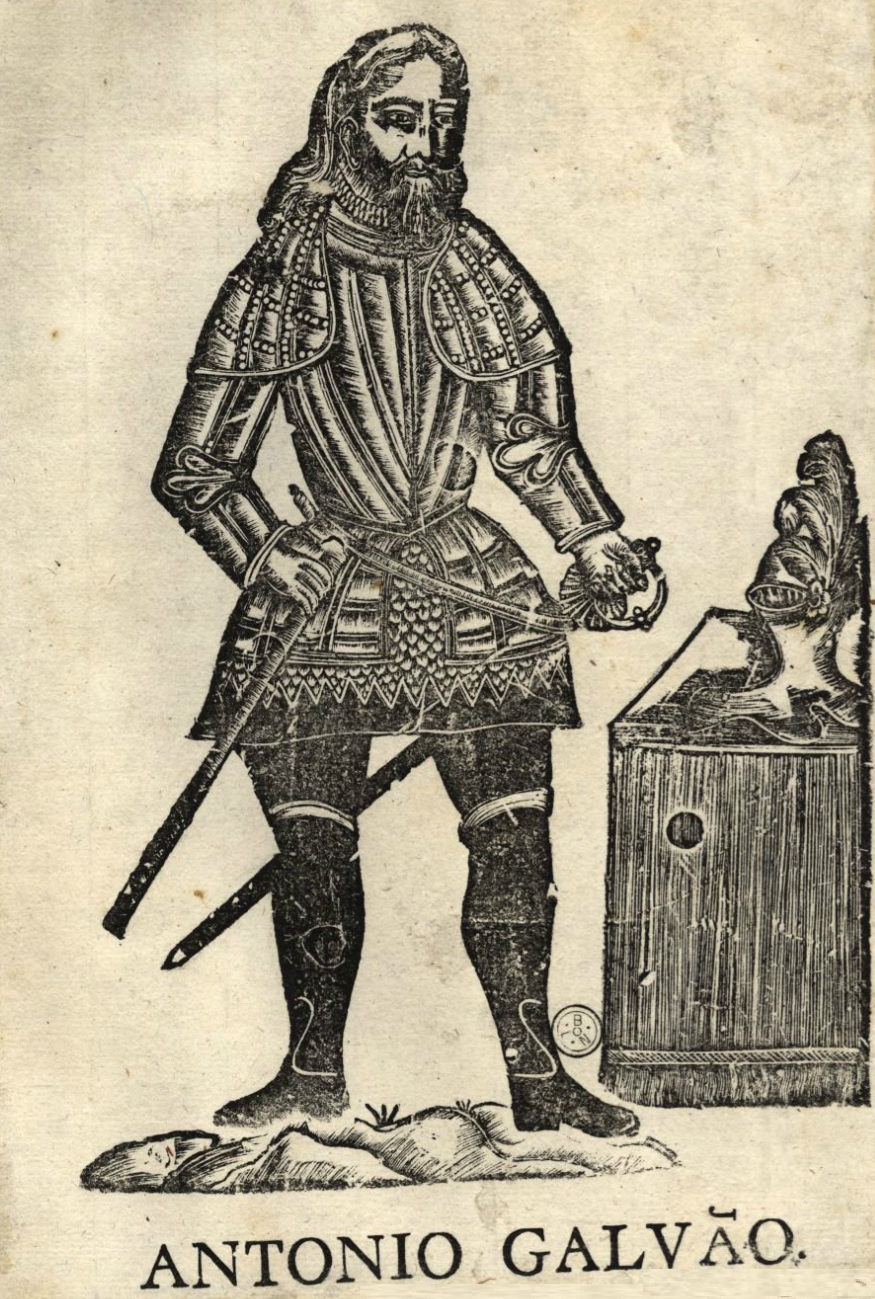
Captain António Galvão, whose invasion of Tidore cost the life of Dayal

Now Dayal's half-brother Tabariji was enthroned. His mother was another Tidore princess, the well-known Nyaicili Boki Raja. Pati Sarangi married her and became the new regent, though he was soon deposed due to treason. Meanwhile, Dayal was active in fomenting a new alliance with the rulers Mir of Tidore, Alauddin of Bacan and Katarabumi of Jailolo, in order to regain his throne. The new Ternatan regent Samarau also sympathized with the alliance. Things looked very somber for the Portuguese who were cornered in their fortress. At this moment, in October 1536, a relief armada appeared from Melaka with a new captain, António Galvão. The capable Galvão, accompanied by 170 Portuguese and 120 dependents led an attack on the fortification of the four allies in Tidore. The allies were well equipped with 5-600 firearms, cuirasses, coats of mail, helmets and swords which had been taken from the Portuguese or received from the Spaniards. In spite of this the invasion turned very successful, and the defenders were pushed back on 21 December. Dayal fought valiantly in shining armour and a headdress with bird-of-paradise feathers, but was severely wounded and died soon after. The allied kings had to agree on peace with the Portuguese. About Dayal's violent end, "they always kept this very secret since he was the first king of Maluku to die by the sword, and they consider this a great dishonour and disgrace because in these countries custom does not permit them to wound a king, and still less to kill him. They keep this as a law because they hold the king to be a holy and sacred thing; and those who survive must revenge his death".

== See also ==
- List of rulers of Maluku
- Sultanate of Ternate
- Tidore Sultanate
- Governor of Maluku
- Spice trade

Dayal of Ternate
Preceded by Boheyat	Sultan of Ternate; 1529–1533	Succeeded by Tabariji
