= Francisco Serrão =

Portuguese explorer (died 1521)

- Born: Unknown; Kingdom of Portugal
- Died: 1521; Sultanate of Ternate
- Occupations: Explorer, soldier
- Known for: First known European to sail east past Malacca through modern Indonesia and the East Indies and the first european to reach the western tip of the Pacific Ocean.

Francisco Serrão (died 1521) was a Portuguese explorer and a possible cousin of Ferdinand Magellan. His 1512 voyage was the first known European sailing east past Malacca through modern Indonesia and the East Indies. He became a confidant of Sultan Bayan Sirrullah, the ruler of Ternate, becoming his personal advisor. He remained in Ternate where he died around the same time Magellan died.

== Voyage to the Indies ==
Serrão served as captain of one of three vessels (and second in overall command under António de Abreu) sent from Malacca by Afonso de Albuquerque to find the Spice Islands of Banda in Maluku in 1511. Banda was the world's only source of nutmeg and mace, spices used as flavourings, medicines and preserving agents that were at the time highly valued in European markets. The Portuguese sought to dominate the source, rather than relying on Arab traders who sold it to the Venetians for exorbitant prices.

Malay pilots guided the expedition east via Java and along the Lesser Sundas before steering them north to Banda via Ambon. When Serrão's ship had berthed at Gresik on Java, he married a Javanese woman as his wife, who then accompanied him on the expedition's further journey. In 1512 his ship was shipwrecked but managed to reach Luco-Pino island (Hitu), north of Ambon. The expedition remained in Banda for about one month, purchasing and filling their ships with nutmeg and mace, as well as cloves in which Banda had a thriving entrepôt trade. Serrão left Banda in a Chinese junk purchased from a regional trader to replace his lost ship. D'Abreu sailed through Ambon while Serrão went ahead towards Maluku islands.

With nine Portuguese crew and nine Indonesians, the ship foundered in a squall and broke up on a reef off a small island. When the island's inhabitants, notorious shipwreck scavengers, surveyed the wreck from a boat, Serrão's crew posed as unarmed and helpless but wealthy castaways. As the scavengers drew near, the Portuguese attacked and commandeered both their craft and crew. Their inadvertent rescuers were then forced to take them to Ambon, where they disembarked in Hitu.

Serrão's armour, muskets and marksmanship impressed the powerful chiefs of Hitu who were warring against Luhu, the principal settlement on Seram's Hoamal Peninsula near Hitu. The Portuguese were also welcomed in the area as buyers of food and spices during a lull in the spice trade due to a temporary disruption to Javanese and Malay sailings to the area following the 1511 conflicts in Malacca. The visitors were recruited as military allies and their subsequent exploits were heard in the rival neighbours of Ternate and Tidore who both rushed emissaries to induce the visitors to assist.

Supporting the territory of the Sultanate of Ternate, the Portuguese strongest power, Serrão served as the head of a mercenary band of Portuguese warriors under the service of the island's Sultan Bayan Sirrullah, one of two feuding powerful sultans who controlled the spice trade. They became close friends and the Sultan appointed Serrão as his personal adviser for all matters, including military (Portuguese document purport) and family issues. Having been well received by the Sultan, Francisco Serrão decided to remain there, not making any efforts to return to Malacca.

== Final years ==
Francisco Serrão's letters to Ferdinand Magellan, carried to Portugal via Portuguese Malacca and describing the 'Spice Islands', helped Magellan persuade the King of Spain to finance his circumnavigation. Before they met each other, Serrão mysteriously died in Ternate in 1521, around the same time that Magellan died in the Philippines (in Mactan Island, Cebu). One theory suggests that Serrão may have been poisoned after falling victim to intrigues at the Sultan's court administered by the Sultan of Ternate himself. His family ties with João Serrão remain unclear in the historiography of Portuguese expeditions to Southeast Asia. The only written document is a list of captains' names in the fleet of Magellan's.

His legacy was the trade deal he negotiated on behalf of Portugal for a monopoly on Ternate's cloves and other spices, which endured for another century. He was the first European to reach the northern Moluccas.

== See also ==
- Exploration of Asia
- History of Indonesia
