= Soekmono =

Indonesian archaeologist and historian

Raden Soekmono (14 July 1922 – 9 July 1997) was an Indonesian archaeologist and historian. He served as head of Indonesia's Archaeological Service and directed the restoration of Borobudur from 1971 to 1983, a significant conservation initiative supported by the Indonesian government and UNESCO.

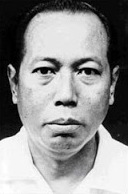

Alongside Satyawati Suleiman, Soekmono was part of the first generation of Indonesian archaeologists to earn a university degree in archaeology, graduating form the Fakultas Sastra Universitas Indonesia in 1953. He was widely known among colleagues, students, and subordinates as Pak Soek.

Following his graduation, Soekmono became the first Indonesia archaeologists to receive the academic title of doctorandus in archaeology. In the same year, he was appointed head of the Dinas Purbakala, a role previously reserved for Dutch officials. He held this position until 1973.

In 1954, Soekmono participated in an archaeological expedition to Sumatra with Satyawati Suleiman, R. P. Soejono, Boechari, Uka Tjandrasasmita, Basoeki, and several Dutch archaeologists. Based on the expedition's findings, he proposed that during the Srivijaya period, the eastern coastline of Sumatra lay further inland than it does today. His reconstruction indicated a large bay in the Jambi and Palembang positioned at the tip of a Peninsula, an interpretation he upheld throughout his career.

In 1970, the Indonesian government appointed Soekmono as Project Manager of the Borobudur Restoration Project. With financial and technical support from UNESCO, this project became one of the largest monument conservation programs in Southeast Asia in the twentieth century.

Despite his administrative and conservation responsibilities, Soekmono completed his doctoral dissertation, Candi, Fungsi, dan Pengertiannya (""Candi, Their Function, and Meaning"), at the Universitas Indonesia in 1974. His research examined the interpretation, function, and architectural characteristics of Indonesian temples (candi)

In addition to his work as an archaeologist and conservation specialist, Soekmono contributed significantly to higher education. From 1953 to 1978, he taught Indonesia cultural history as an adjunct lecturer at the Universitas Indonesia, Universitas Gadjah Mada, Universitas Udayana, dan Perguruan Tinggi Pendidikan Guru in Batusangkar. In 1978, he was appointed Professor of Archaeology at the Fakultas Sastra Universitas Indonesia. Between 1986 and 1987, he served as a Visiting Professor at Leiden University in the Netherlands.

Soekmono also held several national and international positions related to the conservation of archaeological and monumental heritage. His expertise in temple architecture and monument preservation was frequently sought in heritage conservation initiatives within Indonesia and internationally.

== Publications ==
- New light on some Borobudur problems (1969)
- Ancient Indonesian art of the central and eastern Javanese periods (1971)
- Pengantar sejarah kebudayaan Indonesia, Volume 1 (1973)
- Pengantar sejarah kebudayaan Indonesia, Volume 2 (1973)
- Pengantar sejarah kebudayaan Indonesia, Volume 3 (1973)
- Chandi Borobudur: a monument of mankind (1976)
- Chandi Gumpung of Muara Jambi: a platform in stead [sic] of a conventional chandi (1987)
- Rekonstruksi sejarah Malayu kuno sesuai tuntutan arkeologi (1992)
- The Javanese Candi: function and meaning (1995)
