= Boheyat =

Sultan of Ternate
- Reign: 1521–1529
- Predecessor: Bayan Sirrullah
- Successor: Dayal
- Born: c. 1514
- Died: October 1529 (aged 17)
- Father: Bayan Sirrullah
- Mother: Tidore princess
- Religion: Islam

Boheyat (Jawi: بوحيات) or Abu Hayat (ابوحيات; c. 1514 – October 1529) was the third Sultan of Ternate in Maluku, whose largely nominal reign lasted from 1521 to 1529. In his time the Portuguese strengthened their positions in Ternate.

== Accession ==
Boheyat, or Abu Hayat, was born to Sultan Bayan Sirrullah and his main consort, a daughter of Sultan al-Mansur of Tidore. He was only a minor when his father died in 1521, allegedly poisoned. Before his death the old Sultan had instructed his consort to keep the friendship with the Portuguese, of whom some had stayed on Ternate since 1512. The Portuguese seafarers were in an expansive phase and kept the vital trading city Melaka since 1511. The enormous potential profits in the spice trade made Maluku interesting for a permanent establishment. Bayan Sirrullah saw their presence in Ternate as advantageous for the advancement of Ternate's power, not least with regard to their superior weapon technology. After his demise, Boheyat was enthroned, but real power rested with the Queen Mother and the regent Kaicili (prince) Darwis or Taruwes, born from a co-wife of Bayan Sirrullah. The Queen Mother feared that the crafty and enterprising Darwis would appropriate the Sultan's dignity, to which he had no custumary rights, by bonding the Portuguese. She therefore stayed in clandestine contact with her father in Tidore, who would be happy to see the Portuguese leave.

Two original letters in Arab script were issued in the name of Sultan Boheyat and addressed to the King of Portugal, dated 1521 and 1522. They express the sultan's wish to maintain friendship and alliance, and hint at the sinister intentions of the other Malukan kingdoms. These letters are recognized as the oldest Malay manuscripts in the world after the Tanjung Tanah manuscripts. They are currently stored in the Museum of Lisbon, Portugal.

== Portuguese and Spanish interference ==
The Portuguese captain António de Brito began the construction of a fortress on Ternate in 1522, which was named São Jõao Bautista. According to agreement, the spice trade was left to the Portuguese, where a certain price was fixed for the cloves. This arrangement soon made for gross abuses, however. Resentment grew from other causes as well. The father of the widowed queen, the Sultan of Tidore, died in 1526, seemingly poisoned by a Portuguese physician. According to Malukan customs, peace should be kept during the first 40 days after the passing of a ruler. The Portuguese nevertheless staged an attack on Tidore and ruined the place. The arrival of new white foreigners added to the regional instability. Tidore had bonded with the remnants of the Magellan expedition in 1521 and hoped for Spanish reinforcements to counter the Portuguese and Ternatan rivals. In fact a Spanish ship appeared in 1527, whose crew was welcomed with open arms by the Tidorese. The newcomers oversaw the construction of a fort on Tidore; however, the Spanish bases in the Americas were too far away, and the Tidore-Spanish alliance only had substantial consequences after the founding of the Spanish Philippines. The other Malukan kingdoms also let themselves be involved in the rivalries between Spain-Tidore and Portugal-Ternate, since Bacan took Ternate's side and Jailolo on Halmahera supported Tidore.

== Increasing tension ==
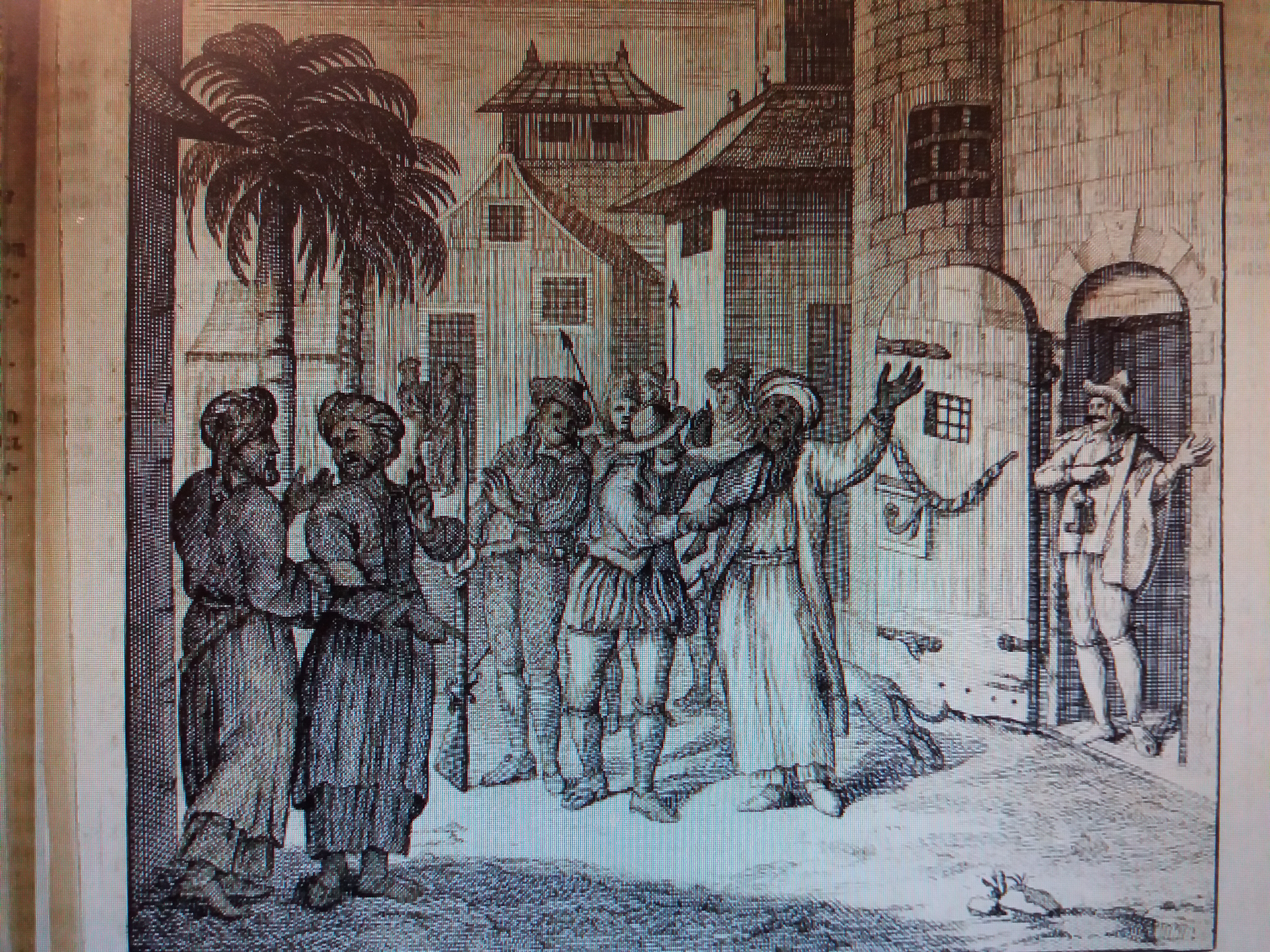
Jorge de Meneses's men insult the qadhi Vaidua, uncle of the king, by rubbing pork in his face; from Valentijn, Oud en Nieuw Oost-Indien (1724).

The regent Kaicili Darwis was an important ally of the Portuguese for several years. He balanced the influence of the Queen Mother from Tidore, who had ambitions to unite Tenate and Tidore under one of her sons and had some support in both places. However, Darwis fell out with the new captain Jorge de Meneses who arrived in 1527 after having "discovered" the Papuan Islands. Meneses grossly insulted the religious feelings of the Muslim Ternatans and treated even aristocrats with utter contempt. In this tense situation, Boheyat died, still an adolescent, in October 1529, after having spent his reign as the virtual prisoner of the Portuguese. There were suspicions about his death being due to poisoning. He was succeeded by his full brother Dayal, under whom the relation between Meneses and Darwis came to a complete rift.

== See also ==
- List of rulers of Maluku
- Sultanate of Ternate
- Tidore Sultanate

Boheyat
Preceded by Bayan Sirrullah	Sultan of Ternate; 1521–1529	Succeeded by Dayal
