= Hairun =

Hairun of Ternate
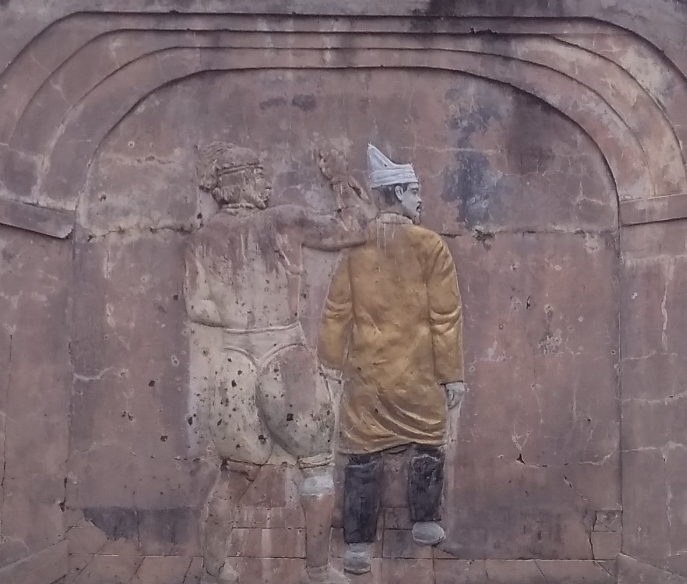
- A relief at Fort Kastela, showing the killing of Hairun by the Portuguese.

Sultan of Ternate
- Reign: 1535–1570
- Predecessor: Tabariji
- Successor: Babullah
- Born: c. 1522
- Died: 28 February 1570 (aged 48); Fort São João Baptista, Portuguese Ternate
Regnal name
- Sultan Hairun Jamilu
- Father: Bayan Sirrullah
- Mother: Javanese lady
- Religion: Islam

Sultan Hairun Jamilu (Jawi: سلطان حيور جميلو; c. 1522 – 28 February 1570) was the 6th Muslim ruler of Ternate in Maluku, reigning from 1535 to 1570. During his long reign, he had a shifting relation to the Portuguese who had a stronghold in Ternate and tried to dominate the spice trade in the region. This ended with his assassination at the hands of a Portuguese soldier in 1570.

== Early life ==
Portuguese seafarers from Melaka had appeared in the waters of eastern Indonesia since 1512. The trade in spices and forest products made it vital for the early colonizers to secure bases in the Maluku Islands (Moluccas) and control the enormously lucrative commerce. A fort was built on Ternate in 1522–1523 with the approval of the local Sultan, who hoped for military assistance to expand his own power. At the time Ternate was the most powerful of the four sultanates of North Maluku, the other being Tidore, Bacan and Jailolo. However, the Portuguese captains soon began to dominate the royal court while the garrison evoked general discontent though their behaviour. An incident in 1535, where Ternatans attacked a Christianized village in Halmahera in defiance of the Portuguese, led to the deposing of the young Sultan Tabariji. The Europeans now picked up a twelve-years old half-brother of Tabariji called Hairun Jamilu, and raised him to the throne. The self-willed actions of the Portuguese captain increased the fear and resentment among the people.

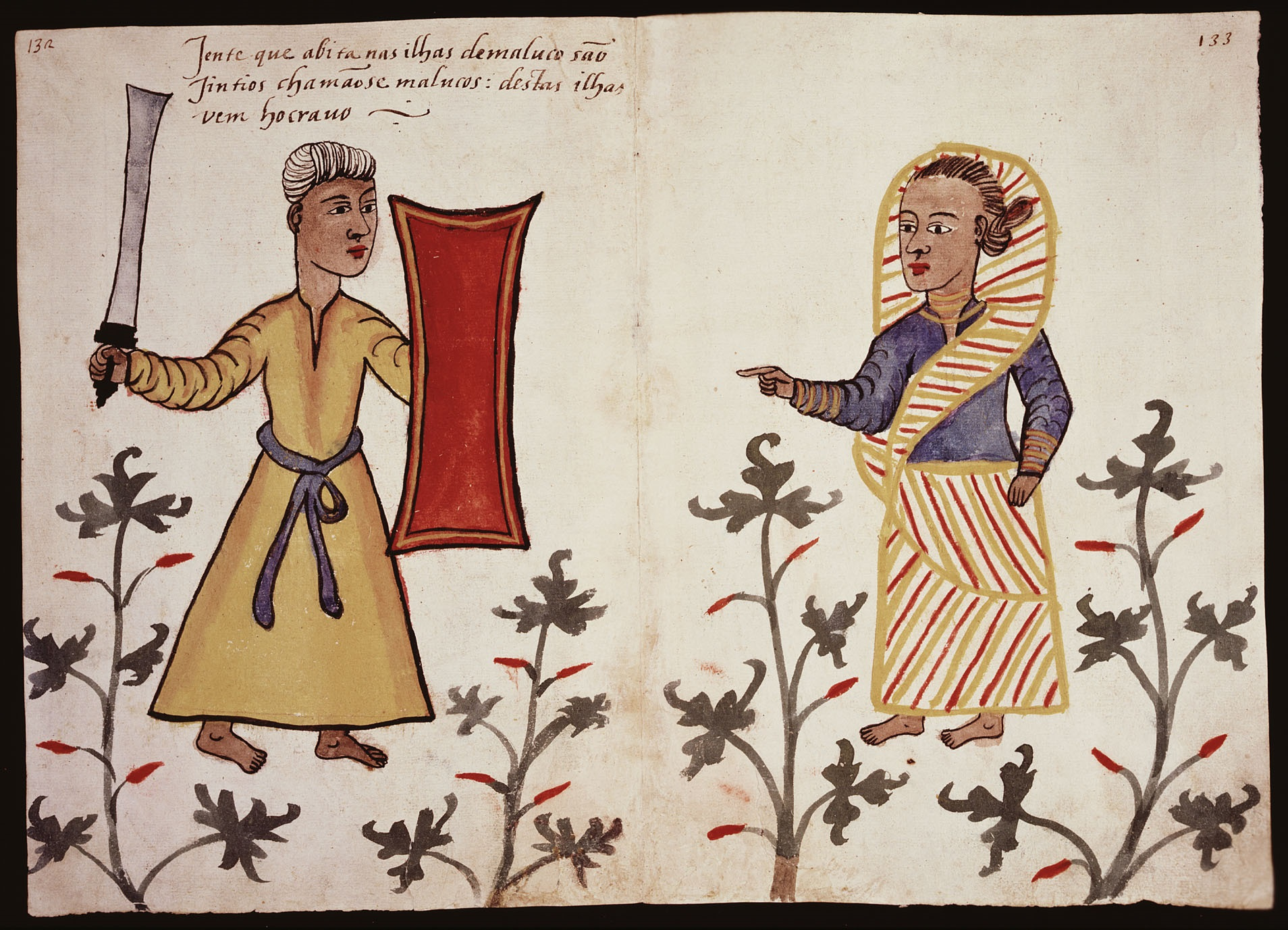
People from northern Maluku in c. 1540, from Códice Casanatense.

Hairun was the son of a former Sultan, Bayan Sirrullah (d. 1521) by a Javanese lady. He had a uterine sister who was married into the Tidore royal family and became the mother of a sultan. Hairun's mother was a practitioner of pre-Islamic rites and did not live at the royal court. When the Portuguese soldiers came to pick up Hairun for enthronement, she violently resisted them, realizing that her son would only become a Portuguese puppet. In the ensuing tumult she died by falling from a window. Nevertheless, Hairun was installed in the end and accepted European tutelage. However, another half-brother of Hairun, Dayal, had been deposed some years previously and fled to the rival Sultanate Tidore, based on an island in the vicinity. There he was supported by his maternal uncle, Sultan Mir, who refused to surrender Dayal. An anti-Portuguese alliance was forged between Tidore, Bacan, Jailolo and dissatisfied Ternatans. In retaliation, a Portuguese army invaded Tidore in 1536, and Dayal was mortally wounded during the fighting.

== Deposal and reinstatement ==
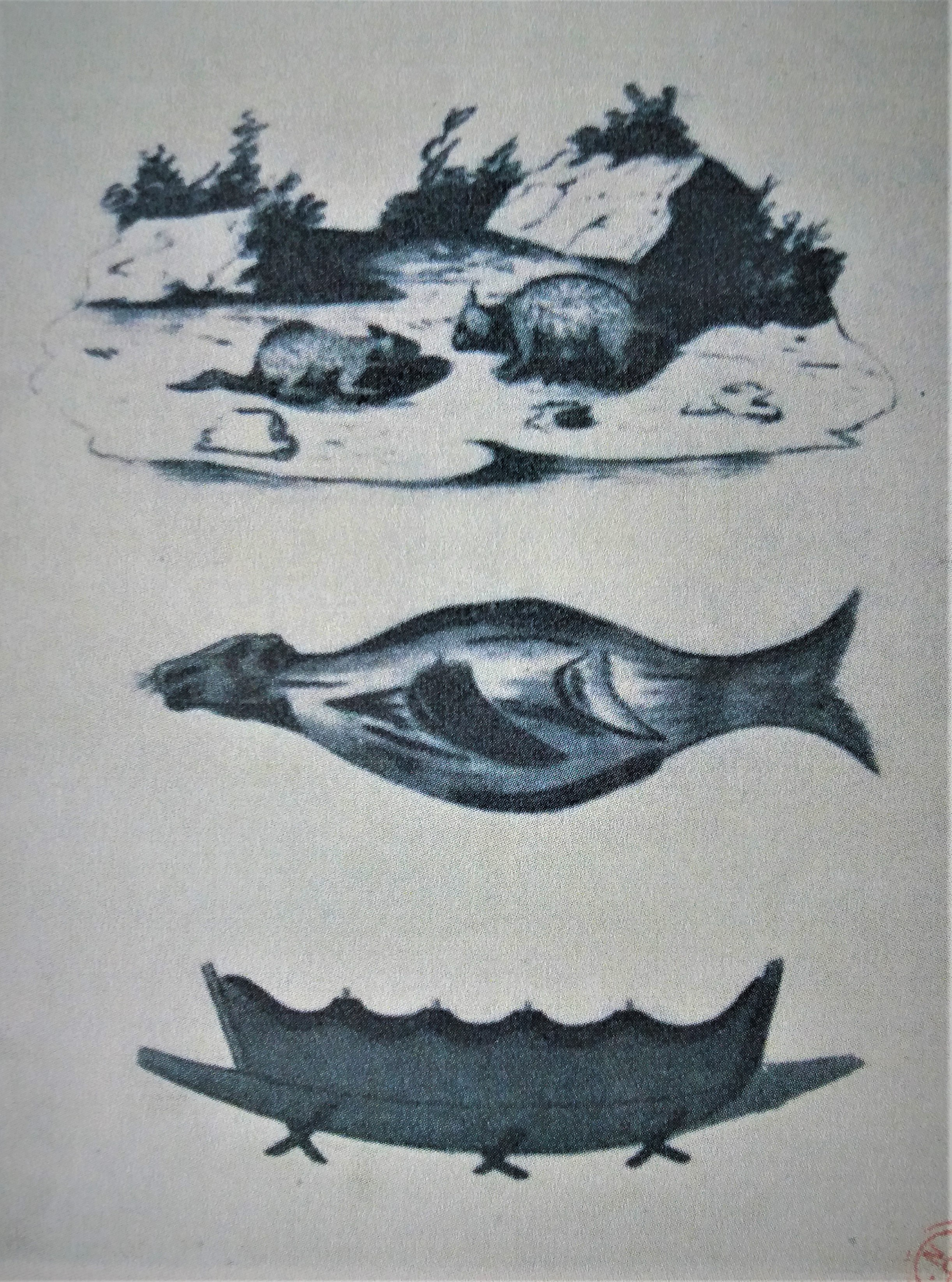
Portuguese images of Maluku in Hairun's time: two cuscus, a dugong, and the hull of a ship. From a manuscript by Gabriel Rebello, 1561

Hairun himself was initially forced to live in the Portuguese fort, but was allowed to live among his own people after a few years. At the beginning of his reign he was seen as an unpromising figure, and the grandees of the kingdom rather wanted Tabariji to return as their Sultan. He seemed to have an interest in Christianity, though he did not actually ask for baptism. Upon his release, however, he began to strengthen his own networks by visiting villages in the islands of Ternate, Makian and Moti. He also obtained the daughter of Sultan Mir of Tidore as consort. The Portuguese authorities found a more promising candidate to promote Christianization in his deposed predecessor Tabariji, who lived in exile in Goa and actually converted to Christianity under the name Dom Manuel. It was decided to dethrone and exile Hairun and recall Tabariji in 1544. However, Tabariji died en route in Melaka, bequeathing his kingdom to the King of Portugal. In the meanwhile, Tabariji's mother Nyaicili Boki Raja was made regent over the temporarily kingless Ternate.

Hairun, who had already been shipped away to his exile, actually visited Goa where he was received with great honour. The Goan authorities reinstalled him as Ternatan ruler and he returned in 1546. There he had the opportunity to see the well-known Jesuit Francis Xavier who undertook extensive missionary work in Maluku and other parts of Asia. In fact Christianity made significant inroads in Halmahera, Menado, Siau Island, etc. The relations between Xavier and Hairun, who spoke Portuguese and dressed in European fashion, were cordial and friendly. Xavier thought that the Sultan had little regard for the Prophet and hoped for his conversion. This was however vain hope, and the attitude of Hairun turned increasingly Islamic and resentful of Christianity as time went by.

== Ternatan-Portuguese military advances ==
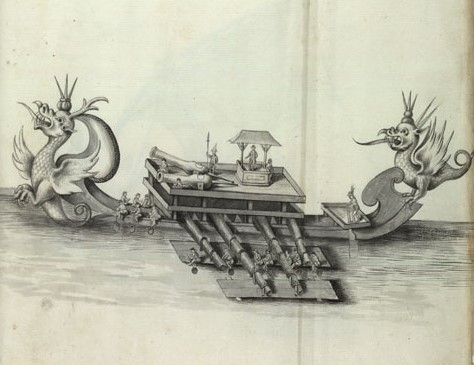
A Malukan kora kora in Gabriel Rebello's manuscript from 1561.

In spite of Hairun's increasing disillusionment with the white foreigners, he cooperated with them against external enemies. One of the four Malukan kingdoms, Jailolo on Halmahera, was led by the strongly Muslim Katarabumi who attacked newly converted Christian villages with great furor. In 1550-1551 Portuguese-Ternatan forces besieged the almost impenetrable royal seat, well defended with artillery, and took it after three months. Jailolo's power was broken, Katarabumi was deprived of his rank as Sultan, and his son Kaicili Gujarati became a Sangaji (sub-ruler) under Ternate. These events greatly strengthened Hairun's position in Maluku.

The main long-standing rival of Ternate was, however, Tidore. The two kingdoms coexisted in an ambivalent way, as Ternate rulers regularly married Sultans' daughters from Tidore in spite of numerous petty wars between the two. A rift appeared between Hairun and the Portuguese in 1557 since the latter confiscated the clove harvest from Makian and imprisoned the Sultan for security reasons. The enraged Ternatan chiefs now allied with the Sultan of Tidore and attacked the positions of the Portuguese, who could barely hold their own. Eventually they found reason to release Hairun and arrived to an agreement. He and his son Baab signed a letter of vassalage which is the oldest preserved letter with seals in Indonesia. The Tidorese ruler Kaicili Gava, however, had used the crisis to take over certain territories in Maluku which had previously been Ternatan dependencies. In a twist of events, Portuguese and Ternatan forces encircled Tolo in Halmahera and defeated the Tidorese in 1560. Gava was forced to submit, but was soon murdered by the Ternate ruler on a state visit.

== War over Ambon and assassination ==
According to a later account, Hairun "was indeed a wise ruler, a brave warrior, extraordinarily correct in the exercise of law and justice, but most of all greatly devoted to his religion, and a strong defender of the Islamic faith." His championship of Islam made him encourage attacks against Christian settlements that took a high toll in human lives. In the 1560s he sent war fleets, with participation from his son Baab, to help up the Muslim positions in Ambon where Catholic missionaries had been successful. The Muslims of Hitu in northern Ambon were supported both by Hairun and Javanese troops from Japara and were successful for a while. The Portuguese had to leave Ambon to its fate for several years, though they eventually came back to build a new stronghold in 1569. Since the Sultan dominated the waterways he could stop the vital deliveries of foodstuff from Moro in Halmahera to the Portuguese settlement in Ternate, to the great embarrassment of the garrison.

Hairun's growing opposition to the Portuguese eventually cost him his life. His dwindling reputation among the Europeans can be seen in contemporary letters which denounced him as a debauched, tyrannical oath-breaker. A reconciliation between Hairun and the Portuguese captain Diogo Lopes de Mesquita was arranged in 1570, but it ended on a bad note. Some days later, on 28 February, the Sultan was urgently summoned by Mesquita to appear in the Portuguese castle to discuss an important issue. When Hairun arrived, he was only allowed inside without his bodyguards. When he was about to depart from the meeting, Mesquita's nephew Martim Afonso Pimentel approached him near the gate and stabbed him with his poignard, exclaiming "Though the galleons have withdrawn to India, there are still Portuguese around here!". The Sultan fell down dying while professing his sincerity vis-à-vis the Portuguese.

The assassination quickly proved to be a huge blunder for the Portuguese. A general uproar followed, led by his capable son Babullah (Kaicili Baab) who was now hailed as the new Sultan. The Portuguese fort was besieged and the garrison forced to capitulate in 1575, inaugurating the golden age of Ternate's power.

== Family ==
Hairun had numerous wives and co-wives, such as:

- A daughter of Sultan Mir of Tidore
- A woman from Bacan, in later chronicles called Boki Tanjung
- A woman from Gamkonara
- Woman from the soa Marsoali

His known children were:

- Babullah of Ternate, who succeeded his father
- Kaicili Tolu
- Kaicili Sugi
- Kaicili Kipati
- Kaicili Sadekin
- Kaicili Mandar Syah
- A daughter, married Dom João, Christian ruler of Bacan
- A daughter, married Kaicili Gava, Sultan of Tidore

== See also ==
- List of rulers of Maluku
- Sultanate of Ternate
- Sultanate of Tidore
- Sultanate of Bacan
- Sultanate of Jailolo
- Governor of Maluku
- Spice trade

Preceded by Tabariji	Sultan of Ternate; 1535-1570	Succeeded by Babullah
