= Satyawati Suleiman =

Indonesian historian and archaeologist

- Born: 7 October 1920; Buitenzorg, Dutch East Indies
- Died: 26 February 1988 (aged 67); Jakarta, Indonesia
- Citizenship: Indonesian
- Education: University of Indonesia
- Known for: Pioneering Indonesian archaeologist Research on Srivijaya
- Scientific career
- Fields: Archaeology

Satyawati Suleiman (7 October 1920 – 26 February 1988) was an Indonesian historian and archaeologist. She is considered a pioneer in Indonesian archaeology and was one of the first women in the field, being the first female archaeology graduate from her alma mater at the University of Indonesia. Her contributions were particularly noted in archaeological research on Srivijaya.

== Early life ==
Suleiman was born in Bogor (then Buitenzorg) on 7 October 1920, the daughter of a Sundanese bupati (regent). Prior to the outbreak of the Second World War, she studied under Dutch Professor Bernet Kempers, but her studies were interrupted by the 1942 Japanese invasion of the Dutch East Indies. Suleiman would later write an account of the Japanese invasion, which was published in 1979.

== Career ==
She began working at Indonesia's Archaeological Service in 1948 and later pursued a degree in archaeology at the University of Indonesia, graduating in 1953. She was the first female archaeology graduate from the university.

During the early 1950s she joined multiple archaeological expeditions to South Sumatra and Jambi which pioneered research into the Srivijaya state. In late 1955, Suleiman met with French researcher Louis-Charles Damais, who gave her a copy of the French George Cœdès' The Indianized States of Southeast Asia. Suleiman offered Damais a spot in a planned Indonesian archaeological mission to India the next year, but the mission was scrapped.

In 1958, Suleiman was sent to the Indonesian Embassy in New Delhi as a cultural attache. After holding the office for three years, she moved to the London Embassy, where she was attache between 1961 and 1963.

After her time abroad, she returned to Indonesia and worked under Soekmono in the National Archaeological Institute, heading the classical archaeology department between 1963 and 1973. In 1973, while Soekmono had been assigned to the restoration of the Borobudur Temple, Satyawati took over as chairman of the body between 1973 and 1977. During her tenure, the body was split into two separate bodies, one tasked with research and studies and the other with restorations and protection, due to the excess workload for a single organization. After her tenure ended, she continued to be a head researcher in the organization until 1985. She was also member in the Governing Board of the SEAMEO SPAFA, from where she launched a program to promote Srivijayan archaeology in Southeast Asia through the holding of workshops in Indonesia and Thailand.

During her career, Suleiman specialized in iconography, and was known to possess great knowledge on various archaeological artifacts found in Sumatra and Java. In her obituary published in the journal Indonesia, British academic O. W. Wolters wrote that Suleiman enjoyed archaeological expeditions outside Jakarta, and noted that her contribution to studies of Srivijaya were "indispensable".

== Later life and death ==
Suleiman retired from the institute in 1985, but she was allowed to maintain an office there where she aided younger researchers in their work. She died in Jakarta on 26 February 1988.

== Selected works ==
- Suleiman, Satyawati (1960s). The Ancient History of Indonesia. Embassy of the Republic of Indonesia, Cultural Department.
- Suleiman, Satyawati (1976). Monuments of Ancient Indonesia. Archaeological Foundation.
- Suleiman, Satyawati (1977). The archaeology and history of West Sumatra. Pusat Penelitian Purbakala dan Peninggalan Nasional, Departemen P & K.
