= Pieter Anton Tiele =

Dutch historian

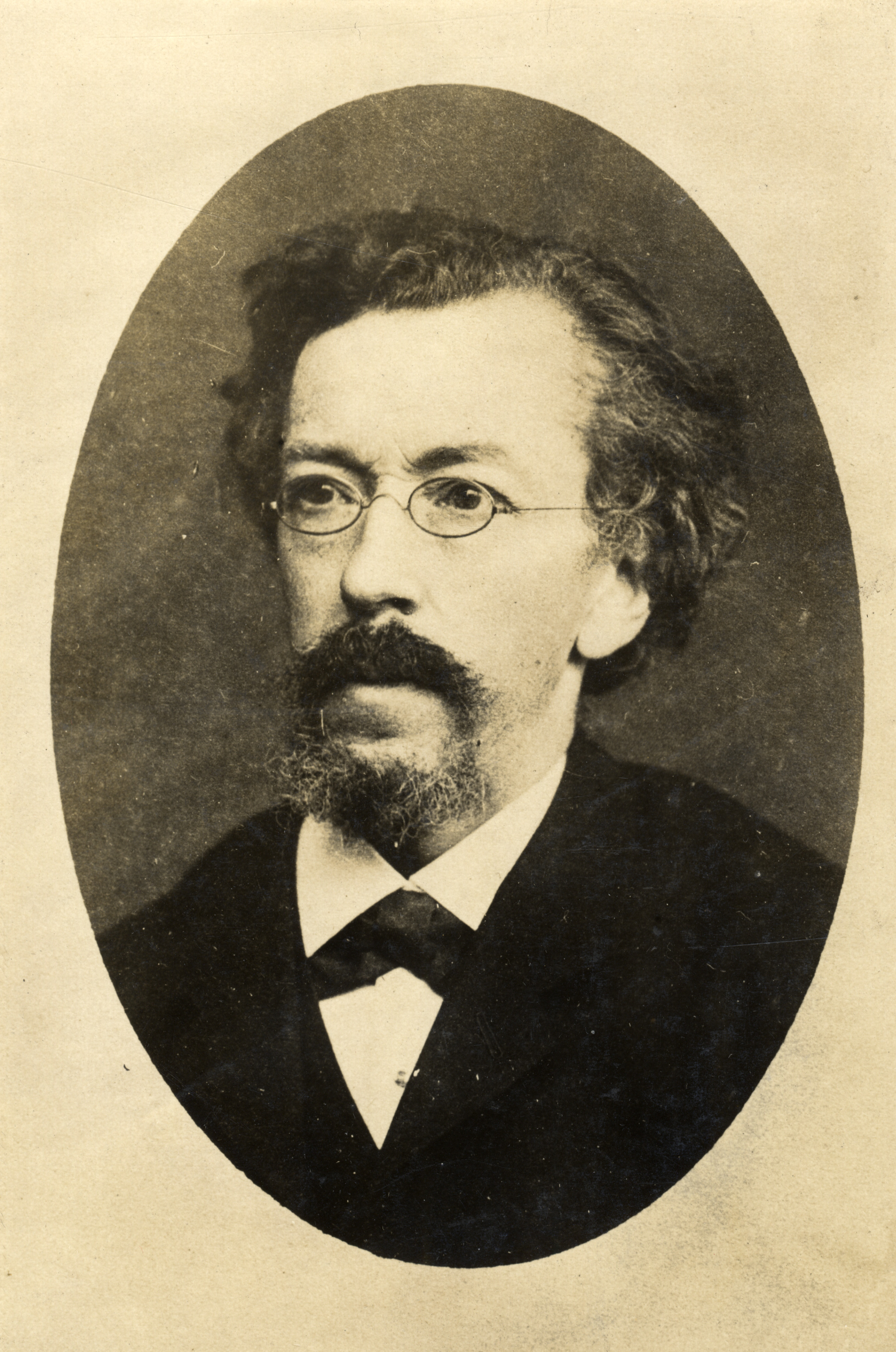
P.A. Tiele

Pieter Anton Tiele (18 January 1834, Leiden – 22 January 1889, Utrecht) was for many years the librarian of Utrecht University.

== Life ==
He was distinguished himself by his bibliographical studies, more especially by his several works on the history of colonization in Asia.

Among these the most noteworthy are: De Opkomst van het nederlandsch Gezag in Oost-Indie (1886); De Vestiging der Portugeezen, in Indie (1873), and other books on the early Portuguese colonization in Maritime Southeast Asia.

== Family ==
Cornelis Petrus Tiele was his brother.

== Publications ==
- Mémoire bibliographique sur les journaux des navigateurs néerlandais réimprimés dans les collections de De Bry et de Hulsius, et dans les collections hollandaises du XVIIe siècle, et sur les anciennes éditions hollandaises des journaux de navigateurs étrangers. Frederik Muller, Amsterdam (1867)
- De Opkomst van het nederlandsch Gezag in Oost-Indie (1886)
- De Vestiging der Portugeezen, in Indie (1873)
- Nederlandsche Bibliographie van Land- en Volkenkunde. Amsterdam, Fr. Muller (1884). Reprint: Amsterdam, Theatrum Orbis Terrarum (1966)
