= António Galvão =

Portuguese soldier, chronicler and administrator in the Maluku Islands

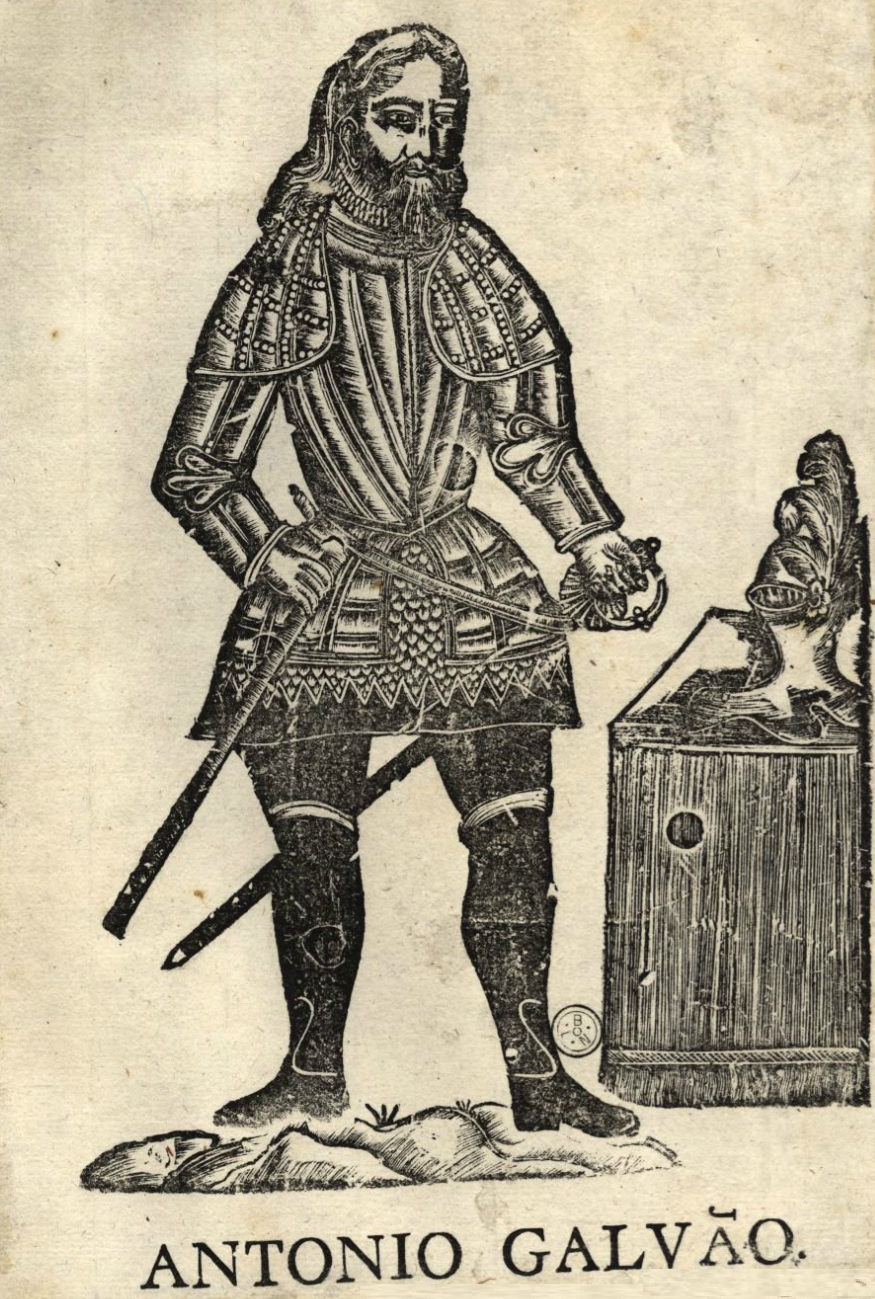
- Born: c. 1490; Lisbon, Portugal
- Died: 1557; Lisbon, Portugal
- Occupations: Soldier, chronicler and colonial administrator

António Galvão (c. 1490–1557), also known as Antonio Galvano, was a Portuguese soldier, chronicler and administrator in the Maluku Islands, and a Renaissance historian who was the first person to present a comprehensive report of the leading voyages and explorers up to 1550 by Portuguese explorers and those of other nationalities. His works, especially the Treaty of Discovery that was published in Lisbon in 1563 and in English by Richard Hakluyt in 1601, are notably accurate.

== Life ==
António Galvão was the son of Duarte Galvão, who was chief diplomat and chronicler to King Afonso V of Portugal.

In 1527, António Galvão sailed for Portuguese India where he became captain of Maluku and governor of the fort of Ternate from 1536 to 1540.

He is described in Chapter II of the Fifth "Decade of Asia" as a respected governor, having sent a mission to Papua and received local embassies. He funded a seminar in Ternate, where he spent 12,000 cruzados from the inheritance he had received from his father, and was known for his integrity.

In 1540, Galvão handed the governance of the fortress to D. Jorge de Castro and returned to Portugal, where he learned he had fallen into disgrace. He spent his last years in anonymity and poverty in the Royal Hospital awaiting a pension. He died in the hospital and was buried in 1557.

== Works ==
António Galvão left two manuscripts; one was the treaty of the discoveries that was printed in 1563 in Lisbon by his friend Francisco de Sousa Tavares. The work, which was based on numerous written sources and documents, presented for the first time a synthesis of all of the discoveries that were made by Portuguese and Spanish explorers until 1550. Richard Hakluyt had the treaty translated into English and published in 1601, as "The discoveries of the world - by Antonio Galvano". (Note: Tratado que compôs o nobre & notauel capitão Antonio Galuão, dos diuersos & desuayrados caminhos, por onde nos tempos passados a pimenta & especearia veyo da India às nossas partes, & assi de todos os descobrimentos antigos & modernos, que são feitos até a era de mil & quinhentos & cincoenta, published 1563 in Lisbon by João da Barreira. PDF of original 1563 edition from Biblioteca Nacional de Portugal Digital. (A 1731 edition under the slightly altered title, Tratado dos Descobrimentos, antigos e modernos, feitos até a era de 1550 was published in Lisbon by Oficina Ferreiriana))

The second manuscript was a history of the Moluccas (Maluku) with the title: "Historia das Molucas, da natureza, e descubrimento daquellas terras divida em 10 livros". ("History of the Moluccas, nature and discovery of the lands divided into 10 books"). This remained unpublished; Francisco de Sousa Tavares passed the manuscript to the crown. It is referred to by 16th-century chroniclers João de Barros and João Baptista Lavanha; a good part of it is said to have been reproduced verbatim within Damião de Góis's 1566-67 Chronica del rey D. Manuel but all trace of the original Galvão manuscript disappeared after Góis's death. In 1928, a document was found in the Archivo General de Indias in Seville with a history of the Maluku that was identified as being part—perhaps an early draft—of António Galvão's lost document. It was published in 1971 a in bilingual (Portuguese-English) edition that was arranged by Hubert Jacobs with the title A Treatise on the Moluccas (c. 1544), probably the preliminary version of António Galvão's lost Historia das Moluccas (Rome: Jesuit Historical Society).

== See also ==
- Fernão Lopes de Castanheda
- Gaspar Correia
