= Mir of Tidore =

Mir (Amiruddin)

Sultan of Tidore
- Reign: 1526-1550s
- Predecessor: al-Mansur
- Successor: Gava
- Died: 1550s
- Father: al-Mansur
- Religion: Islam

Sultan Mir (Jawi: سلطان مير); or Amiruddin Iskandar Dulkarna'in (امير الدين اسکندر ذوالقرنين; c. 1511 ― 1550s) was the third Sultan of Tidore in Maluku Islands. He had a long and troubled reign from 1526 to the 1550s where he tried to counter the hegemonic ambitions of the Portuguese and their Ternate allies. The global rivalries between Spain and Portugal characterized the period, and the two Iberian powers indiscriminately involved the spice sultanates Tidore and Ternate in their power game.

== Succession to the throne ==
In the 16th century Tidore was the second most important polity in North Maluku after Ternate. The Malukan sultanates generated some wealth through the trade in cloves which attracted merchants from other parts of Asia, and eventually European seafarers. The best cloves supposedly grew in Tidore. The Portuguese, coming from Melaka, established a base in nearby Ternate and, allying with the local elite, made war on Tidore. After a temporary peace agreement in 1526, Sultan al-Mansur was apparently poisoned by a Portuguese physician. He left a large number of children of whom a young man of fifteen years was placed on the throne. This was Mir, whose full royal titles were Sultan Amiruddin Iskandar Dulkarna'in. As soon as al-Mansur was dead, the Portuguese broke the peace and made an armed incursion to Tidore. According Malukan custom, no hostilities should be initiated as long as a ruler lay unburied, and the Tidorese did not expect an attack. The inhabitants fled to the hills while the royal settlement was torched. The behavior of the Portuguese increased local resentment against the Christian Europeans, not only among the Tidore people.

== Spanish assistance and further struggles ==
Bonds of friendship had been tied with the Spanish since the visit of the Magellan expedition in 1521. Spain believed that Maluku fell within its sphere of interest as laid down in the treaty of Tordesillas, and dispatched a new expedition for the Spice Islands under García Jofre de Loaísa in 1524. A large part of the crew including Loaisa himself died during the passage over the Pacific. Of seven ships, only one reached Tidore on 1 January 1527, where they were welcomed as saviours. The ruler of Jailolo on Halmahera also held with Spain against the Portuguese. The two Iberian groups had a few skirmishes but then left each other in peace for the moment, and the Spaniards and their Tidore allies built a fortification on the island. They received a small reinforcement in 1528 when the expedition of Álvaro de Saavedra Cerón reached Tidore via the Philippines. With their support, Tidore and Jailolo expanded their territory at the cost of Ternate, but could not prevent that the Portuguese again attacked and burned the royal settlement in 1529. Sultan Mir's personal reign started in 1529, while the leading politician was his able and respected brother Kaicili Rade. Two of his sisters, including the well-known Nyaicili Boki Raja, were mothers of a succession of Ternatan Sultans, a circumstance that did not prevent the perennial rivalries between the two island kingdoms.

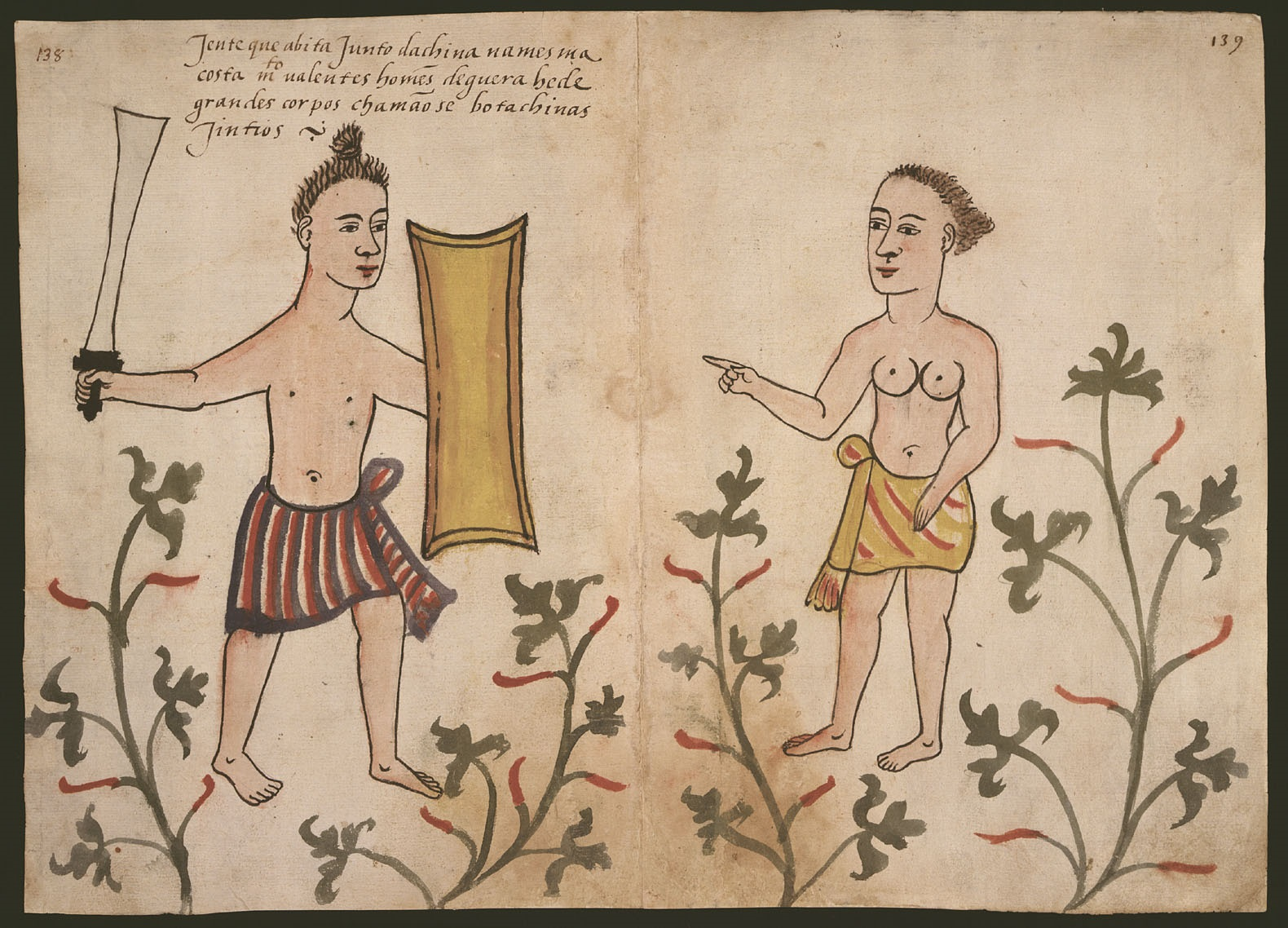
Inhabitants of Batochina (Halmahera), where Tidore strove to expand its power; image from Codice Casanatense (c. 1540).

The dwindling Spanish garrison finally left Tidore in 1534, and a new confrontation with Ternate soon followed. The deposed Sultan Dayal of Ternate fled to Mir who was his mother's brother. Mir refused to return him to the Portuguese; on the contrary an alliance began to form between Dayal and the other three Malukan rulers: Mir of Tidore, Alauddin of Bacan and Katarabumi of Jailolo. However, a new and energetic Portuguese captain in Ternate, António Galvão, led a small invasion force that attacked the superior forces of the four kings, which by this time had access to firearms and other European weaponry. Dayal was mortally wounded in the struggle and the other kings were forced to sue for peace. Kaicili Rade conducted the negotiations as his brother's representative. Galvão told him that he would prefer to depose the recalcitrant Mir and appoint Rade as Sultan in his stead, but Rade indignantly refused to betray his brother. It is mentioned that the elite in Tidore already spoke Spanish and Portuguese by this time.

== New Spanish intervention and the Jailolo war ==
Yet a Spanish expedition under Ruy López de Villalobos traversed the Pacific Ocean in 1542–1543. After visiting the Philippines, it again made contact with Tidore. The crew cooperated with Sultan Mir to rebuild the fortifications that António Galvão had destroyed. Mir on his part assisted the Europeans with ships and men for the further exploration of the Philippine islands. When some Spaniards were captured and brought to one of the Papuan Islands, the pirates' nest Gebe, Mir dispatched an expedition to chastise the raiders with mixed success. The incident indicates that the Papuan territories were still not really under Tidorese suzerainty. The Spanish made some effort to explore the islands to the east of Maluku, and it was now that the name New Guinea was coined. Major armed confrontations with the Portuguese were avoided, but intimidations by their Iberian rivals forced the Spanish to again leave Maluku in 1546, Villalobos succumbing to sickness in Ambon.

The Portuguese were initially too weak to force Mir to bring down the Spanish fortifications on Tidore, but events five years later changed the picture. King Katarabumi of Jailolo, who was honoured in North Maluku as a "second Muhammad" and was the first to write the local language with Arabic letters, raided Christianized villages in Halmahera and was therefore soon in turn attacked by Portuguese and Ternatan forces in 1551. His daughter was married to Sultan Mir who tried to support his in-law. However, the near-impenetrable royal settlement of Jailolo fell after a long siege. As a result, Jailolo became a Ternatan vassal and thus ceased to be an independent kingdom. While this happened Mir was conducting a raiding expedition to the Sulawesi area. When he returned, Captain Bernaldim de Sousa, feeling strong enough to put on pressure, arranged a meeting with the Sultans of Ternate and Tidore. In spite of considerable resentment among the aristocracy, Mir had to agree to raze the fortifications. His life after these events is not recorded, but he must have died in the 1550s. As late as 1556 there is a reference to the now-Christian Nyaicili Boki Raja (Dona Isabel) as being "irmãa d'el-rey de Tidore". The next ruler mentioned in near-contemporary sources is Gava.

== Family ==
Sultan Mir was married to a Jailolo princess in 1544. Genealogical records from Bacan say that the consort of Hairun of Ternate (r. 1535-1570) had a sister Boki Hongi, daughter of Alauddin of Bacan, who married a Sultan of Tidore, maybe Mir. A Portuguese report says that Hairun was both a son-in-law and brother-in-law of Mir. In a letter from 1608, Sultan Saidi Berkat of Ternate claimed that his grandaunt, Hairun's sister, was married in Tidore, presumably with Mir; she gave birth to the Tidore Sultan who ruled around 1570, by implication Gapi Baguna.

Portuguese texts mention a few children of Mir: a daughter who married Hairun of Ternate around 1540, and a son called Sama. His relation to the following recorded sultans, Gava and Gapi Baguna, is not explicitly stated though they may have been sons.

== See also ==
- List of rulers of Maluku
- Spice trade
- Tidore Sultanate
- Sultanate of Ternate

Mir of Tidore
Preceded by Al-Mansur of Tidore	Sultan of Tidore; 1526-1550s	Succeeded by Gava
