= Oesman Sadik Airport =

Airport in Labuha, Indonesia

Oesman Sadik Airport Bandar Udara Oesman Sadik
- IATA: LAH; ICAO: WAEL

Summary
- Operator: South Halmahera Government
- Serves: Labuha
- Location: Labuha, South Halmahera, North Maluku, Indonesia
- Time zone: WIT (UTC+09:00)
- Elevation AMSL: 7 ft / 2 m
- Coordinates: 0°38′14.44″S 127°30′02.70″E
- Website: upbuoesmansadik.id

Map
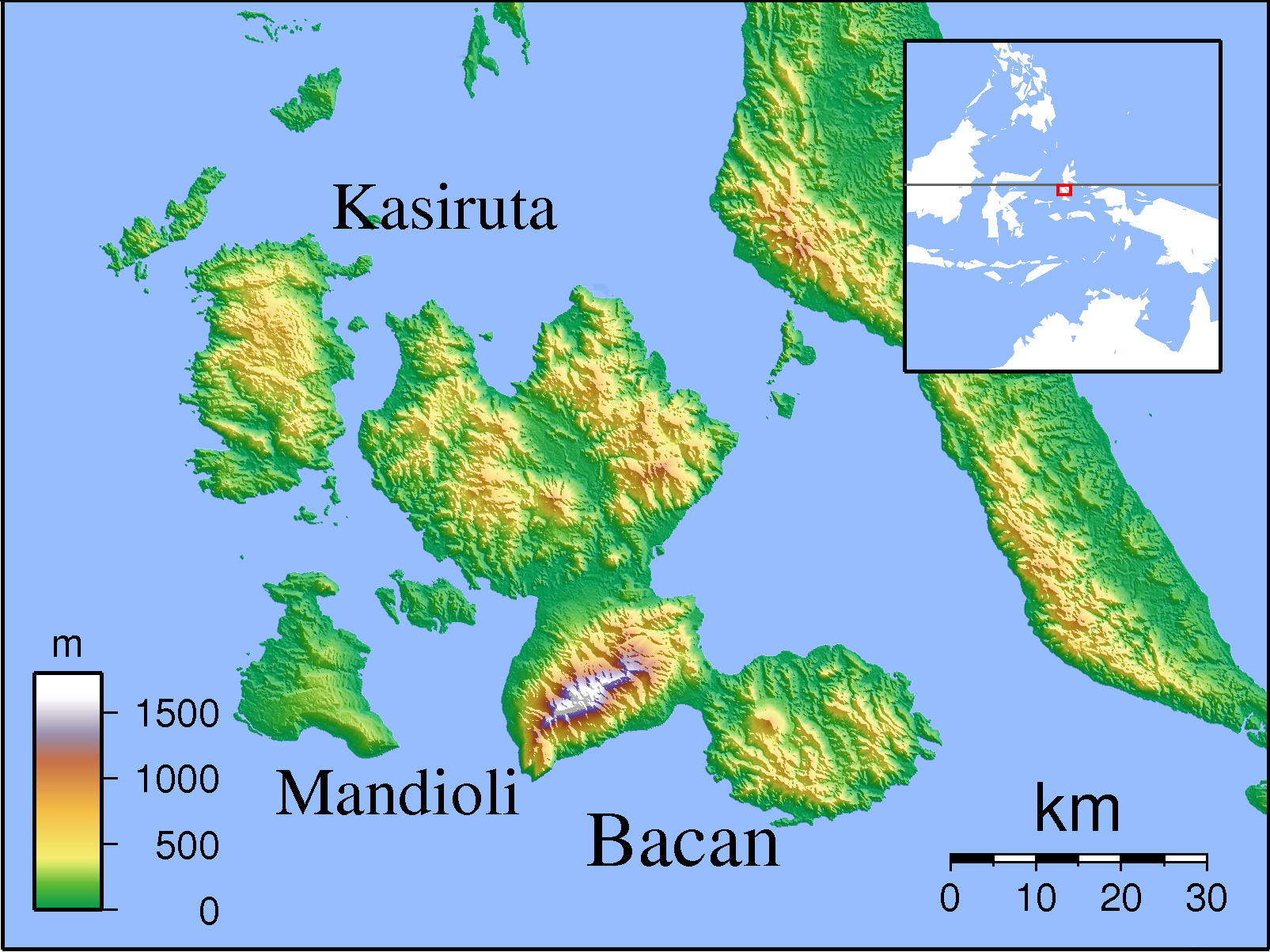
- Location in Bacan Location in Maluku Islands Location in Indonesia

Runways
Direction	Length		Surface
Direction	ft	m	Surface
06/24	5,380	1,650	Asphalt

Oesman Sadik Airport (IATA: LAH, ICAO: WAEL) is a domestic airport serving Labuha, the capital of South Halmahera Regency, North Maluku, Indonesia. The airport is operated by Technical Implementation Unit of the Directorate General of Civil Aviation. It is the main air gateway to South Halmahera and serves scheduled passenger flights to Ternate and Manado.

== History ==
Oesman Sadik Airport has served South Halmahera as the region's primary airport. In 2017, the South Halmahera Regency government announced plans to extend the airport's runway from 1,650 metres to 2,500 metres, to allow larger aircraft to operate at the airport. The project was intended to support economic activities, tourism, fisheries, plantations, and mining in South Halmahera.

In 2021, the South Halmahera Regency government proposed a further runway extension to meet the standard for a national-class airport. Local officials stated that the proposal had been approved by the central government. However, As of 2025, land acquisition for further runway expansion was still under discussion.

== Airlines and destinations ==
Airlines	Destinations
Wings Air	Manado, (Note: Manado is continuation of Ternate flight as same flight number) Ternate

== Statistic ==
Frequency of flights at Oesman Sadik Airport
Rank	Destinations	Frequency (weekly)	Airline(s)
1	Ternate, North Maluku	12	Wings Air
2	Ambon, Maluku	7	Wings Air
