= Piletocera batjianalis =

Scientific classification
- Kingdom: Animalia
- Phylum: Arthropoda
- Class: Insecta
- Order: Lepidoptera
- Family: Crambidae
- Genus: Piletocera
- Species: P. batjianalis

Binomial name
- Piletocera batjianalis Strand, 1920

Species of moth

Piletocera batjianalis is a moth in the family Crambidae. It was described by Strand in 1920. It is found in Indonesia, where it has been recorded from the Maluku Islands (Batjan).
