= Emeopedus solutus =

Scientific classification
- Kingdom: Animalia
- Phylum: Arthropoda
- Class: Insecta
- Order: Coleoptera
- Suborder: Polyphaga
- Infraorder: Cucujiformia
- Family: Cerambycidae
- Genus: Emeopedus
- Species: E. solutus

Binomial name
- Emeopedus solutus Pascoe, 1864

Species of beetle

Emeopedus solutus is a species of longhorn beetle in the Lamiinae. It was described by Pascoe in 1864. It is endemic to Bacan Islands.

== Description ==
The species is reddish-brown in colour and have greyish pubescence and brown coloured half of the bottom. It have small scutellum and round butt. Elytron is coarsely punctured while its head and prothorax is punctured too but closely.
