= Piletocera reunionalis =

Scientific classification
- Kingdom: Animalia
- Phylum: Arthropoda
- Class: Insecta
- Order: Lepidoptera
- Family: Crambidae
- Genus: Piletocera
- Species: P. reunionalis

Binomial name
- Piletocera reunionalis Viette, 1957

Species of moth

Piletocera reunionalis is a moth of the family Crambidae. It is endemic to La Réunion where it is very common.

It has a wingspan ranging from 9 to 16 mm and is hard to distinguish from Piletocera viperalis. It occurs in different colorations: clear, grey and dark.
