= Sibela =

Mountain in the Maluku Islands, Indonesia

Mount Sibela
- Location within Maluku

Highest point
- Elevation: 2,118 m (6,949 ft)
- Listing: Ribu
- Coordinates: 0°34′12″S 127°30′36″E

Geography
- Location: Bacan Island, South Halmahera Regency, North Maluku, Indonesia
- Parent range: Maluku Islands

Sibela (Indonesian: Gunung Sibela) or Buku Sibela is known as one of the highest points in the Maluku Islands, with a height of 2,118 meters above sea level (masl).

== Description ==
Mount Sibela is part of a tropical landscape rich in biodiversity, including endemic flora and fauna of the Maluku Islands. This area offers dense tropical rainforest and the potential to be used as a location for scientific research and conservation. Some threats to the environmental sustainability of this mountain include deforestation and land exploration.

== See also ==
- List of ultras of the Malay Archipelago
