= Piletocera megaspilalis =

Scientific classification
- Kingdom: Animalia
- Phylum: Arthropoda
- Class: Insecta
- Order: Lepidoptera
- Family: Crambidae
- Genus: Piletocera
- Species: P. megaspilalis

Binomial name
- Piletocera megaspilalis Hampson, 1897

Species of moth

Piletocera megaspilalis is a moth in the family Crambidae. It was described by George Hampson in 1897. It is found in the Bacan Islands of Indonesia.
