= Piletocera albicinctata =

Scientific classification
- Kingdom: Animalia
- Phylum: Arthropoda
- Class: Insecta
- Order: Lepidoptera
- Family: Crambidae
- Genus: Piletocera
- Species: P. albicinctata

Binomial name
- Piletocera albicinctata Hampson, 1897

Species of moth

Piletocera albicinctata is a moth in the family Crambidae. It was described by George Hampson in 1897. It is found in the Bacan Islands of Indonesia and on the Shortland Islands of the Solomon Islands.
