= Piletocera punctatalis =

Scientific classification
- Domain: Eukaryota
- Kingdom: Animalia
- Phylum: Arthropoda
- Class: Insecta
- Order: Lepidoptera
- Family: Crambidae
- Genus: Piletocera
- Species: P. punctatalis

Binomial name
- Piletocera punctatalis (Legrand, 1966)

Synonyms
- Stenia punctatalis Legrand, 1966

Species of moth

Piletocera punctatalis is a moth in the family Crambidae. It was described by Henry Legrand in 1966. It is found on the Seychelles, where it has been recorded from Aldabra.
