= Piletocera macroperalis =

Scientific classification
- Kingdom: Animalia
- Phylum: Arthropoda
- Class: Insecta
- Order: Lepidoptera
- Family: Crambidae
- Genus: Piletocera
- Species: P. macroperalis

Binomial name
- Piletocera macroperalis Hampson, 1897

Species of moth

Piletocera macroperalis is a moth in the family Crambidae. It was described by George Hampson in 1897. It is found in Australia, where it has been recorded from Queensland.

The wingspan is about 20 mm. The forewings have an indistinct waved antimedial line and a more distinct minutely dentate postmedial line. The apical area is clothed with leaden-coloured scales. The hindwings have traces of a postmedial line.
