= Emeopedus alboguttatus =

Scientific classification
- Kingdom: Animalia
- Phylum: Arthropoda
- Class: Insecta
- Order: Coleoptera
- Suborder: Polyphaga
- Infraorder: Cucujiformia
- Family: Cerambycidae
- Genus: Emeopedus
- Species: E. alboguttatus

Binomial name
- Emeopedus alboguttatus Fisher, 1935

Species of beetle

Emeopedus alboguttatus is a species of longhorn beetle in the subfamily Lamiinae. It was described by Fisher in 1935. It is found in Borneo and Sabah, Malaysia at the elevation of 7,000 feet (2,100 m) on Mount Kinabalu.
