= Piletocera exuvialis =

Scientific classification
- Kingdom: Animalia
- Phylum: Arthropoda
- Class: Insecta
- Order: Lepidoptera
- Family: Crambidae
- Genus: Piletocera
- Species: P. exuvialis

Binomial name
- Piletocera exuvialis (Snellen, 1890)

Synonyms
- Diplotyla exuvialis Snellen, 1890

Species of moth

Piletocera exuvialis is a moth in the family Crambidae. It was described by Snellen in 1890. It is found in India (Sikkim).
