= Emeopedus =

Scientific classification
- Kingdom: Animalia
- Phylum: Arthropoda
- Class: Insecta
- Order: Coleoptera
- Suborder: Polyphaga
- Infraorder: Cucujiformia
- Family: Cerambycidae
- Subfamily: Lamiinae
- Tribe: Acanthocinini
- Genus: Emeopedus; Pascoe, 1864

Genus of beetles

Emeopedus is a genus of beetles in the family Cerambycidae, containing the following species:

subgenus Emeopedus

- Emeopedus degener Pascoe, 1864
- Emeopedus insidiosus Pascoe, 1864
- Emeopedus solutus Pascoe, 1864

subgenus Longicornemeopedus

- Emeopedus alboguttatus Fisher, 1935
- Emeopedus griseomarmoratus Breuning, 1956
- Emeopedus longicornis Fisher, 1925
- Emeopedus pulchellus Heller, 1924

subgenus Papuemeopedus

- Emeopedus baloghi Breuning, 1975
- Emeopedus papuanus Breuning, 1959

subgenus Variegatemeopedus

- Emeopedus variegatus Fisher, 1927
