= Emeopedus longicornis =

Scientific classification
- Kingdom: Animalia
- Phylum: Arthropoda
- Class: Insecta
- Order: Coleoptera
- Suborder: Polyphaga
- Infraorder: Cucujiformia
- Family: Cerambycidae
- Genus: Emeopedus
- Species: E. longicornis

Binomial name
- Emeopedus longicornis Fisher, 1925

Species of beetle

Emeopedus longicornis is a species of beetle in the family Cerambycidae. It was described by Fisher in 1925.
