= Piletocera purpureofusa =

Scientific classification
- Domain: Eukaryota
- Kingdom: Animalia
- Phylum: Arthropoda
- Class: Insecta
- Order: Lepidoptera
- Family: Crambidae
- Genus: Piletocera
- Species: P. purpureofusa

Binomial name
- Piletocera purpureofusa Hampson, 1917

Species of moth

Piletocera purpureofusa is a moth in the family Crambidae. It was described by George Hampson in 1917. It is found on the Solomon Islands, where it has been recorded from Choiseul Island.
