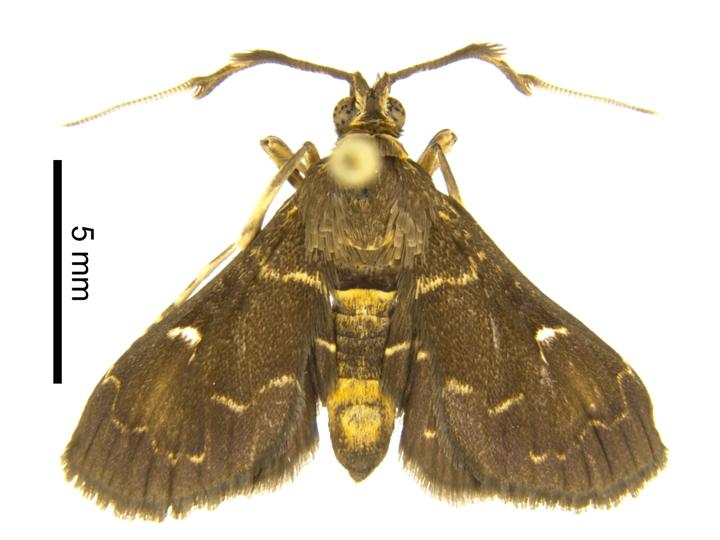

Scientific classification
- Kingdom: Animalia
- Phylum: Arthropoda
- Class: Insecta
- Order: Lepidoptera
- Family: Crambidae
- Genus: Piletocera
- Species: P. xanthosoma

Binomial name
- Piletocera xanthosoma (Meyrick, 1886)

Synonyms
- Strepsimela xanthosoma Meyrick, 1886

= Piletocera xanthosoma =

Species of moth

Piletocera xanthosoma is a moth of the family Crambidae described by Edward Meyrick in 1886. It is found on Fiji, Tonga and Samoa.

Larvae have been recorded feeding on Zingiber officinale (ginger) produce.
