= Labuha =

- Town
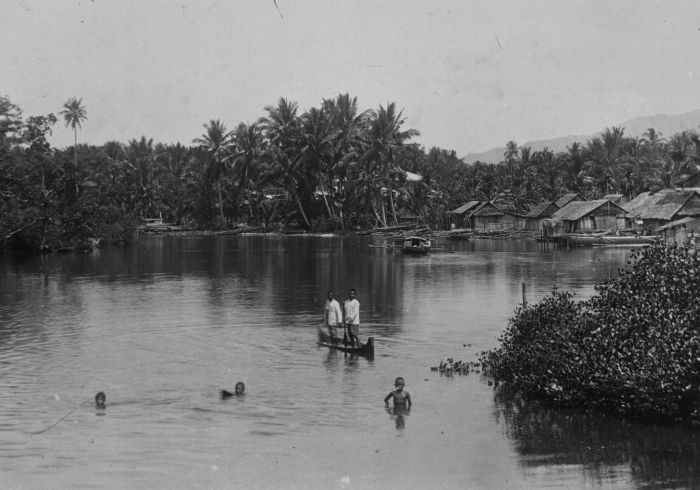
- Children swimming in the vicinity of Labuha in the 1930s

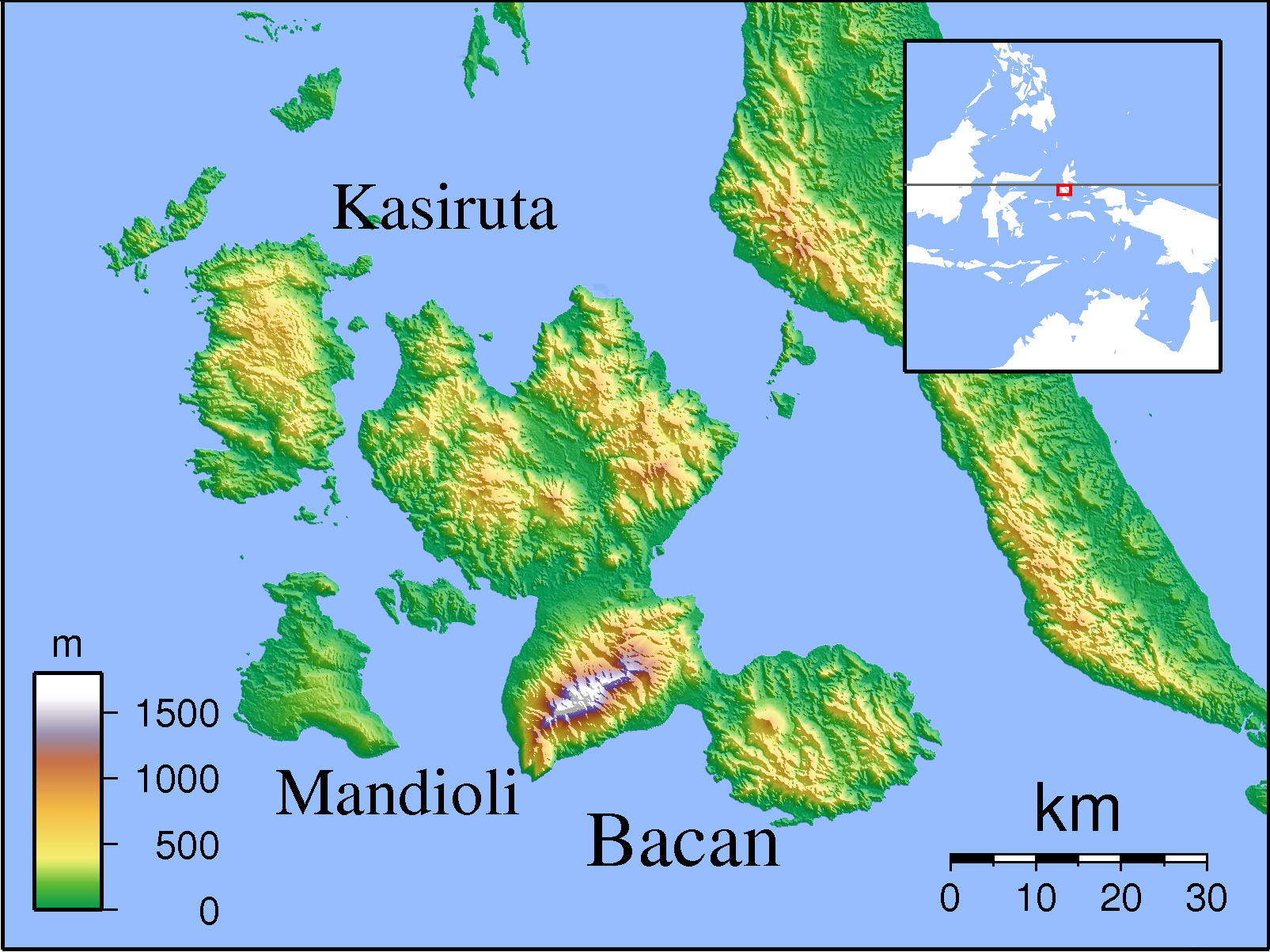
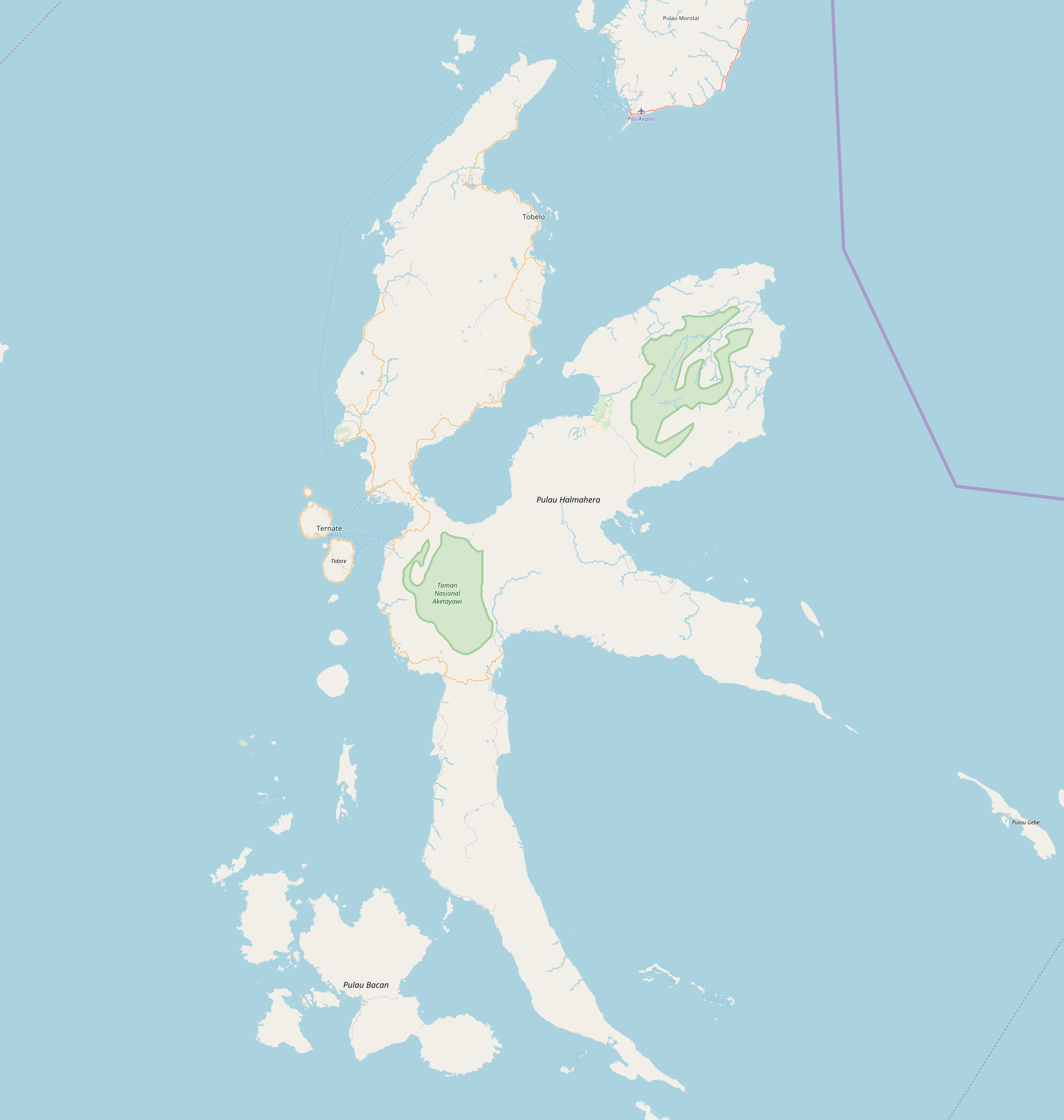
- Location in Bacan, Halmahera, Maluku and Indonesia Labuha (Halmahera) Labuha (North Maluku) Labuha (Indonesia)
- Coordinates: 0°37′40″S 127°28′50″E
- Country: Indonesia
- Region: Maluku
- Province: North Maluku
- Regency: South Halmahera Regency

Area
  - Urban: 2.4 km^{2} (0.93 sq mi)
  - Metro: 32.5 km^{2} (12.5 sq mi)

Population (2020 Census)
  - Town: 7,073
  - Metro: 13,546
  - Metro density: 417/km^{2} (1,080/sq mi)
- Time zone: UTC+9 (IEST)
- Postcode: 97791
- Area code: (+62) 929

Labuha is a small port town on the eastern Indonesian island of Pulau Bacan. It is the capital of the South Halmahera Regency, part of the province of North Maluku, and also the administrative centre of the Bacan District within the regency. It had a population at the 2020 Census of 7,073 (13,546 including the adjoining urban communes of Amasing Kota, Amasing Kota Barat and Amasing Kota Utara). The town is served by Labuha Airport.

== Climate ==
Labuha has a tropical rainforest climate (Af) with moderate to heavy rainfall year-round.

Climate data for Labuha
Month	Jan	Feb	Mar	Apr	May	Jun	Jul	Aug	Sep	Oct	Nov	Dec	Year
Mean daily maximum °C (°F)	30.0 (86.0)	30.1 (86.2)	30.1 (86.2)	30.5 (86.9)	30.1 (86.2)	29.8 (85.6)	29.2 (84.6)	29.7 (85.5)	30.0 (86.0)	30.3 (86.5)	31.1 (88.0)	30.1 (86.2)	30.1 (86.2)
Daily mean °C (°F)	26.5 (79.7)	26.6 (79.9)	26.6 (79.9)	26.9 (80.4)	26.8 (80.2)	26.6 (79.9)	26.1 (79.0)	26.4 (79.5)	26.3 (79.3)	26.5 (79.7)	27.3 (81.1)	26.6 (79.9)	26.6 (79.9)
Mean daily minimum °C (°F)	23.1 (73.6)	23.2 (73.8)	23.2 (73.8)	23.4 (74.1)	23.5 (74.3)	23.5 (74.3)	23.1 (73.6)	23.1 (73.6)	22.7 (72.9)	22.7 (72.9)	23.6 (74.5)	23.1 (73.6)	23.2 (73.8)
Average rainfall mm (inches)	187 (7.4)	175 (6.9)	193 (7.6)	164 (6.5)	154 (6.1)	148 (5.8)	165 (6.5)	134 (5.3)	105 (4.1)	103 (4.1)	133 (5.2)	180 (7.1)	1,841 (72.6)
Source: Climate-Data.org
