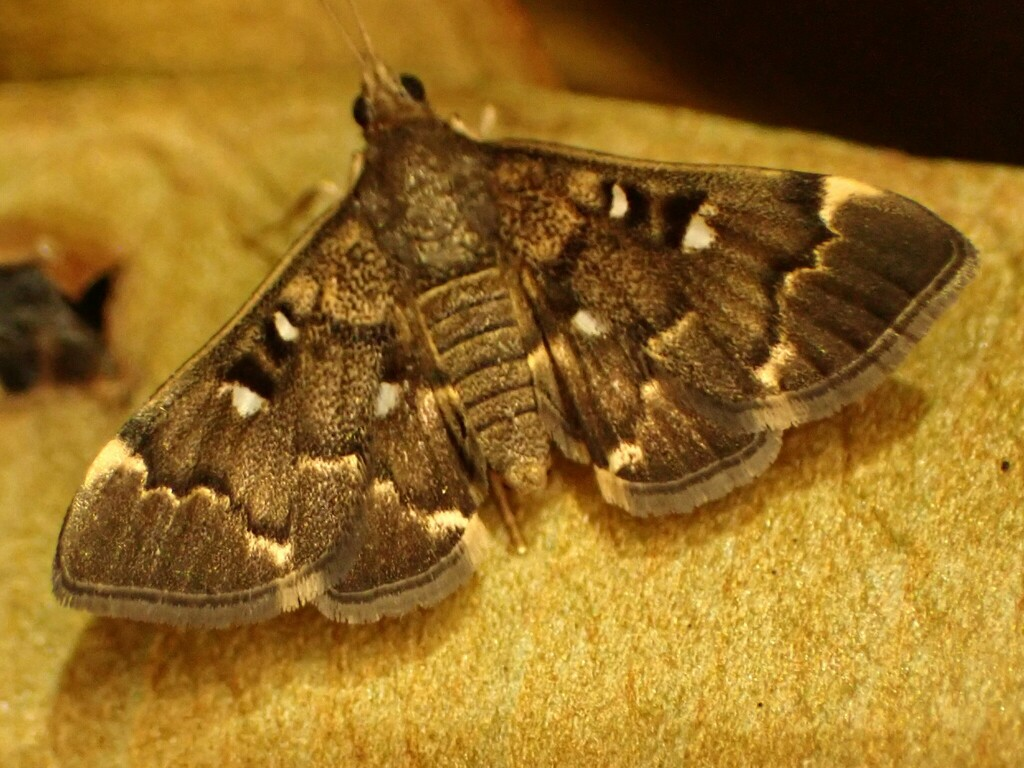

Scientific classification
- Kingdom: Animalia
- Phylum: Arthropoda
- Class: Insecta
- Order: Lepidoptera
- Family: Crambidae
- Genus: Piletocera
- Species: P. fluctualis

Binomial name
- Piletocera fluctualis (Fabricius, 1787)

Synonyms
- Phalaena fluctualis Fabricius, 1787

= Piletocera fluctualis =

Species of moth

Piletocera fluctualis is a moth in the family Crambidae. It was described by Johan Christian Fabricius in 1787. It is found on Tonga and the Cook Islands.
