= Piletocera costifascialis =

Scientific classification
- Domain: Eukaryota
- Kingdom: Animalia
- Phylum: Arthropoda
- Class: Insecta
- Order: Lepidoptera
- Family: Crambidae
- Genus: Piletocera
- Species: P. costifascialis

Binomial name
- Piletocera costifascialis George Hampson, 1917

Species of moth

Piletocera costifascialis is a moth in the family Crambidae. It was described by George Hampson in 1917. It is found in Malaysia.
