= Emeopedus variegatus =

Scientific classification
- Kingdom: Animalia
- Phylum: Arthropoda
- Class: Insecta
- Order: Coleoptera
- Suborder: Polyphaga
- Infraorder: Cucujiformia
- Family: Cerambycidae
- Genus: Emeopedus
- Species: E. variegatus

Binomial name
- Emeopedus variegatus Fisher, 1927

Species of beetle

Emeopedus variegatus is a species of beetle in the family Cerambycidae. It was described by Fisher in 1927.
