= Piletocera albimixtalis =

Scientific classification
- Kingdom: Animalia
- Phylum: Arthropoda
- Class: Insecta
- Order: Lepidoptera
- Family: Crambidae
- Genus: Piletocera
- Species: P. albimixtalis

Binomial name
- Piletocera albimixtalis Hampson, 1917

Species of moth

Piletocera albimixtalis is a moth in the family Crambidae. It was described by George Hampson in 1917. It is found in Australia, where it has been recorded from Queensland.

The wings have a pattern of various shades of brown.
