= Piletocera orientalis =

Scientific classification
- Kingdom: Animalia
- Phylum: Arthropoda
- Class: Insecta
- Order: Lepidoptera
- Family: Crambidae
- Genus: Piletocera
- Species: P. orientalis

Binomial name
- Piletocera orientalis (Snellen, 1880)

Synonyms
- Aediodes orientalis Snellen, 1880

Species of moth

Piletocera orientalis is a moth in the family Crambidae. It was described by Snellen in 1880. It is found in Indonesia (Sulawesi).
