= Piletocera bisignalis =

Scientific classification
- Kingdom: Animalia
- Phylum: Arthropoda
- Class: Insecta
- Order: Lepidoptera
- Family: Crambidae
- Genus: Piletocera
- Species: P. bisignalis

Binomial name
- Piletocera bisignalis Hampson, 1917

Species of moth

Piletocera bisignalis is a moth in the family Crambidae. It was described by George Hampson in 1917. It is found in Bali, Indonesia.
