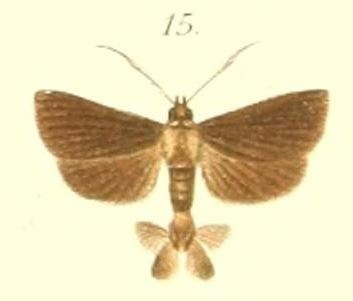
- Piletocera atrata

Scientific classification
- Kingdom: Animalia
- Phylum: Arthropoda
- Class: Insecta
- Order: Lepidoptera
- Family: Crambidae
- Genus: Piletocera
- Species: P. atrata

Binomial name
- Piletocera atrata (Pagenstecher, 1900)

Synonyms
- Diplotyla atrata Pagenstecher, 1900

= Piletocera atrata =

Species of moth

Piletocera atrata is a moth of the family Crambidae found in Papua New Guinea.
