= Piletocera leucodelta =

Scientific classification
- Domain: Eukaryota
- Kingdom: Animalia
- Phylum: Arthropoda
- Class: Insecta
- Order: Lepidoptera
- Family: Crambidae
- Genus: Piletocera
- Species: P. leucodelta

Binomial name
- Piletocera leucodelta (Meyrick, 1937)

Synonyms
- Sematosopha leucodelta Meyrick, 1937

Species of moth

Piletocera leucodelta is a moth in the family Crambidae. It was described by Edward Meyrick in 1937. It is found on the Solomon Islands, where it has been recorded from New Georgia.
