= Piletocera aequalis =

Scientific classification
- Kingdom: Animalia
- Phylum: Arthropoda
- Class: Insecta
- Order: Lepidoptera
- Family: Crambidae
- Genus: Piletocera
- Species: P. aequalis

Binomial name
- Piletocera aequalis (Walker, 1866)

Synonyms
- Aediodes aequalis Walker, 1866

Species of moth

Piletocera aequalis is a moth in the family Crambidae. It was described by Francis Walker in 1866. It is found in New Guinea.
