= Piletocera violalis =

Scientific classification
- Kingdom: Animalia
- Phylum: Arthropoda
- Class: Insecta
- Order: Lepidoptera
- Family: Crambidae
- Genus: Piletocera
- Species: P. violalis

Binomial name
- Piletocera violalis Lederer, 1863

Species of moth

Piletocera violalis is a moth in the family Crambidae. It was described by Julius Lederer in 1863. It is found on Indonesia's Ambon Island.
