= Piletocera microdontalis =

Scientific classification
- Kingdom: Animalia
- Phylum: Arthropoda
- Class: Insecta
- Order: Lepidoptera
- Family: Crambidae
- Genus: Piletocera
- Species: P. microdontalis

Binomial name
- Piletocera microdontalis Hampson, 1907

Species of moth

Piletocera microdontalis is a moth in the family Crambidae. It was described by George Hampson in 1907. It is found in Papua New Guinea, where it has been recorded from Woodlark Island.
