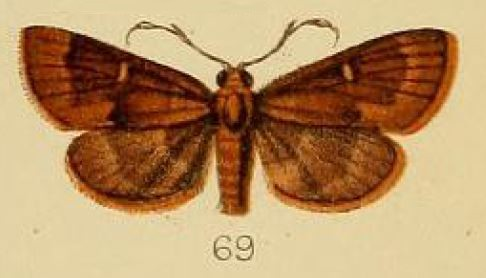
- Piletocera inconspicualis

Scientific classification
- Kingdom: Animalia
- Phylum: Arthropoda
- Class: Insecta
- Order: Lepidoptera
- Family: Crambidae
- Genus: Piletocera
- Species: P. inconspicualis

Binomial name
- Piletocera inconspicualis Kenrick, 1907

= Piletocera inconspicualis =

Species of moth

Piletocera inconspicualis is a moth of the family Crambidae. It is found in Papua New Guinea.

It has a wingspan of 30 mm.
