= Piletocera penicillalis =

Scientific classification
- Domain: Eukaryota
- Kingdom: Animalia
- Phylum: Arthropoda
- Class: Insecta
- Order: Lepidoptera
- Family: Crambidae
- Genus: Piletocera
- Species: P. penicillalis

Binomial name
- Piletocera penicillalis (Christoph, 1881)

Synonyms
- Endotricha penicillalis Christoph, 1881; Metasia penicillalis

Species of moth

Piletocera penicillalis is a moth in the family Crambidae. It was described by Hugo Theodor Christoph in 1881. It is found in the Russian Far East (Amur).
