= Piletocera costipunctata =

Scientific classification
- Domain: Eukaryota
- Kingdom: Animalia
- Phylum: Arthropoda
- Class: Insecta
- Order: Lepidoptera
- Family: Crambidae
- Genus: Piletocera
- Species: P. costipunctata

Binomial name
- Piletocera costipunctata (Warren, 1896)

Synonyms
- Danaga costipunctata Warren, 1896

Species of moth

Piletocera costipunctata is a moth in the family Crambidae. It was described by Warren in 1896. It is found in India (Meghalaya).
