= Piletocera steffanyi =

Scientific classification
- Domain: Eukaryota
- Kingdom: Animalia
- Phylum: Arthropoda
- Class: Insecta
- Order: Lepidoptera
- Family: Crambidae
- Genus: Piletocera
- Species: P. steffanyi

Binomial name
- Piletocera steffanyi Tams, 1935

Species of moth

Piletocera steffanyi is a moth in the family Crambidae. It was described by Willie Horace Thomas Tams in 1935. It is found on Samoa.
