= Piletocera hecate =

Scientific classification
- Domain: Eukaryota
- Kingdom: Animalia
- Phylum: Arthropoda
- Class: Insecta
- Order: Lepidoptera
- Family: Crambidae
- Genus: Piletocera
- Species: P. hecate

Binomial name
- Piletocera hecate (Butler, 1886)

Synonyms
- Graphicopoda hecate Butler, 1886

Species of moth

Piletocera hecate is a moth in the family Crambidae. It was described by Arthur Gardiner Butler in 1886. It is found on Tonga.
