= Piletocera bistrigalis =

Scientific classification
- Kingdom: Animalia
- Phylum: Arthropoda
- Class: Insecta
- Order: Lepidoptera
- Family: Crambidae
- Genus: Piletocera
- Species: P. bistrigalis

Binomial name
- Piletocera bistrigalis Hampson, 1917

Species of moth

Piletocera bistrigalis is a moth in the family Crambidae. It was described by George Hampson in 1917. It is found in Papua New Guinea.
