= Piletocera melanauges =

Scientific classification
- Kingdom: Animalia
- Phylum: Arthropoda
- Class: Insecta
- Order: Lepidoptera
- Family: Crambidae
- Genus: Piletocera
- Species: P. melanauges

Binomial name
- Piletocera melanauges (Meyrick, 1886)

Synonyms
- Erebangela melanauges Meyrick, 1886

Species of moth

Piletocera melanauges is a moth in the family Crambidae. It was described by Edward Meyrick in 1886. It is found on Tonga and Fiji.
