= Piletocera nudicornis =

Scientific classification
- Kingdom: Animalia
- Phylum: Arthropoda
- Class: Insecta
- Order: Lepidoptera
- Family: Crambidae
- Genus: Piletocera
- Species: P. nudicornis

Binomial name
- Piletocera nudicornis Hampson, 1897

Species of moth

Piletocera nudicornis is a moth in the family Crambidae. It was described by George Hampson in 1897. It is found in India.
