= Piletocera ulophanes =

Scientific classification
- Kingdom: Animalia
- Phylum: Arthropoda
- Class: Insecta
- Order: Lepidoptera
- Family: Crambidae
- Genus: Piletocera
- Species: P. ulophanes

Binomial name
- Piletocera ulophanes (Meyrick, 1886)

Synonyms
- Ptilaeola ulophanes Meyrick, 1886

Species of moth

Piletocera ulophanes is a moth in the family Crambidae. It was described by Edward Meyrick in 1886. It is found in Fiji.
