= Piletocera agathanalis =

Scientific classification
- Domain: Eukaryota
- Kingdom: Animalia
- Phylum: Arthropoda
- Class: Insecta
- Order: Lepidoptera
- Family: Crambidae
- Genus: Piletocera
- Species: P. agathanalis

Binomial name
- Piletocera agathanalis Schaus, 1924

Species of moth

Piletocera agathanalis is a moth in the family Crambidae. It was described by William Schaus in 1924. It is found in Panama.

The wingspan is about 18 mm. The forewings are whitish, the costa, cell and postmedial space before the line suffused with purplish brown and the termen with fuscous. There is a fuscous spot at the base of the costa and a spot near the base of the inner margin. The antemedial line is fuscous and there is a fuscous-black line on the discocellular, forming part of a fainter medial line. The postmedial line is rather remote, fuscous, vertical to the discal fold and minutely wavy. There are some faint terminal dark points. The hindwings are semihyaline (almost glass like) and whitish. The termen is suffused with purplish brown and there is a black point on the discocellular, as well as a dentate postmedial fuscous line and a fuscous terminal line.
