= Piletocera octosemalis =

Scientific classification
- Kingdom: Animalia
- Phylum: Arthropoda
- Class: Insecta
- Order: Lepidoptera
- Family: Crambidae
- Genus: Piletocera
- Species: P. octosemalis

Binomial name
- Piletocera octosemalis Hampson, 1896

Species of moth

Piletocera octosemalis is a moth in the family Crambidae. It was described by George Hampson in 1896. It is found in Myanmar.
