= Piletocera rotundalis =

Scientific classification
- Domain: Eukaryota
- Kingdom: Animalia
- Phylum: Arthropoda
- Class: Insecta
- Order: Lepidoptera
- Family: Crambidae
- Genus: Piletocera
- Species: P. rotundalis

Binomial name
- Piletocera rotundalis Hampson, 1907

Species of moth

Piletocera rotundalis is a moth in the family Crambidae. It was described by George Hampson in 1907. It is found in Bali, Indonesia.
