= Piletocera quadralis =

Scientific classification
- Kingdom: Animalia
- Phylum: Arthropoda
- Class: Insecta
- Order: Lepidoptera
- Family: Crambidae
- Genus: Piletocera
- Species: P. quadralis

Binomial name
- Piletocera quadralis (Snellen, 1901)

Synonyms
- Diplotyla quadralis Snellen, 1901

Species of moth

Piletocera quadralis is a moth in the family Crambidae. It was described by Snellen in 1901. It is found in Indonesia (Java).
