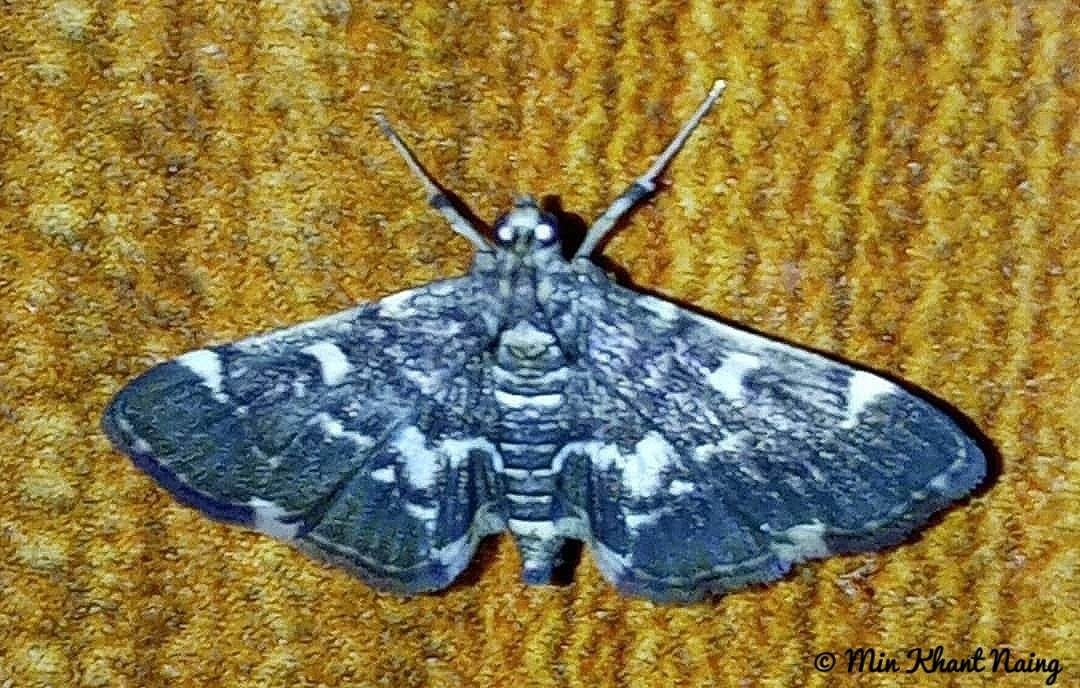

Scientific classification
- Domain: Eukaryota
- Kingdom: Animalia
- Phylum: Arthropoda
- Class: Insecta
- Order: Lepidoptera
- Family: Crambidae
- Genus: Piletocera
- Species: P. sodalis

Binomial name
- Piletocera sodalis (Leech, 1889)

Synonyms
- Desmia sodalis Leech, 1889; Piletocera parki Kirpichnikova, 1978

= Piletocera sodalis =

Species of moth

Piletocera sodalis is a species of moth in the family Crambidae. It was described by John Henry Leech in 1889. It is found in Japan, Myanmar, China and Korea.
