= Piletocera analytodes =

Scientific classification
- Kingdom: Animalia
- Phylum: Arthropoda
- Class: Insecta
- Order: Lepidoptera
- Family: Crambidae
- Genus: Piletocera
- Species: P. analytodes

Binomial name
- Piletocera analytodes Hampson, 1917

Species of moth

Piletocera analytodes is a moth in the family Crambidae. It was described by George Hampson in 1917. It is found in Papua New Guinea, where it has been recorded from Rook Island in the Bismarck Archipelago of Papua New Guinea.
