= Piletocera flavomaculalis =

Scientific classification
- Kingdom: Animalia
- Phylum: Arthropoda
- Class: Insecta
- Order: Lepidoptera
- Family: Crambidae
- Genus: Piletocera
- Species: P. flavomaculalis

Binomial name
- Piletocera flavomaculalis Pagenstecher, 1884

Species of moth

Piletocera flavomaculalis is a moth in the family Crambidae. It was described by Pagenstecher in 1884. It is found in Indonesia (Ambon Island).
