= Piletocera chlorura =

Scientific classification
- Kingdom: Animalia
- Phylum: Arthropoda
- Class: Insecta
- Order: Lepidoptera
- Family: Crambidae
- Genus: Piletocera
- Species: P. chlorura

Binomial name
- Piletocera chlorura (Meyrick, 1887)

Synonyms
- Ceratoclasis chlorura Meyrick, 1887; Nacoleia melanauges Turner, 1913

Species of moth

Piletocera chlorura is a moth in the family Crambidae. It was described by Edward Meyrick in 1887. It is found in Australia, where it has been recorded from Queensland.

The wingspan is about 20 mm. The forewings are dark fuscous with slightly darker lines and a whitish subcostal dot. The postmedian line is wavy, bent above the tornus to below the end of the cell. It is edged posteriorly by a few whitish dots, and on the costa by a short whitish streak. The hindwings are dark fuscous, towards the base mixed with whitish.

The caterpillars of P. chlorura were found to feed on the leaves of Xylopia cuspidata (Annonaceae).
