= Piletocera erebina =

Scientific classification
- Domain: Eukaryota
- Kingdom: Animalia
- Phylum: Arthropoda
- Class: Insecta
- Order: Lepidoptera
- Family: Crambidae
- Genus: Piletocera
- Species: P. erebina

Binomial name
- Piletocera erebina (Butler, 1886)

Synonyms
- Hormatholepis erebina Butler, 1886

Species of moth

Piletocera erebina is a moth in the family Crambidae. It was described by Arthur Gardiner Butler in 1886.

== Distribution ==
It is found on Fiji.
