= Emeopedus pulchellus =

Scientific classification
- Kingdom: Animalia
- Phylum: Arthropoda
- Class: Insecta
- Order: Coleoptera
- Suborder: Polyphaga
- Infraorder: Cucujiformia
- Family: Cerambycidae
- Genus: Emeopedus
- Species: E. pulchellus

Binomial name
- Emeopedus pulchellus Heller, 1924

Species of beetle

Emeopedus pulchellus is a species of beetle in the family Cerambycidae. It was described by Heller in 1924.
