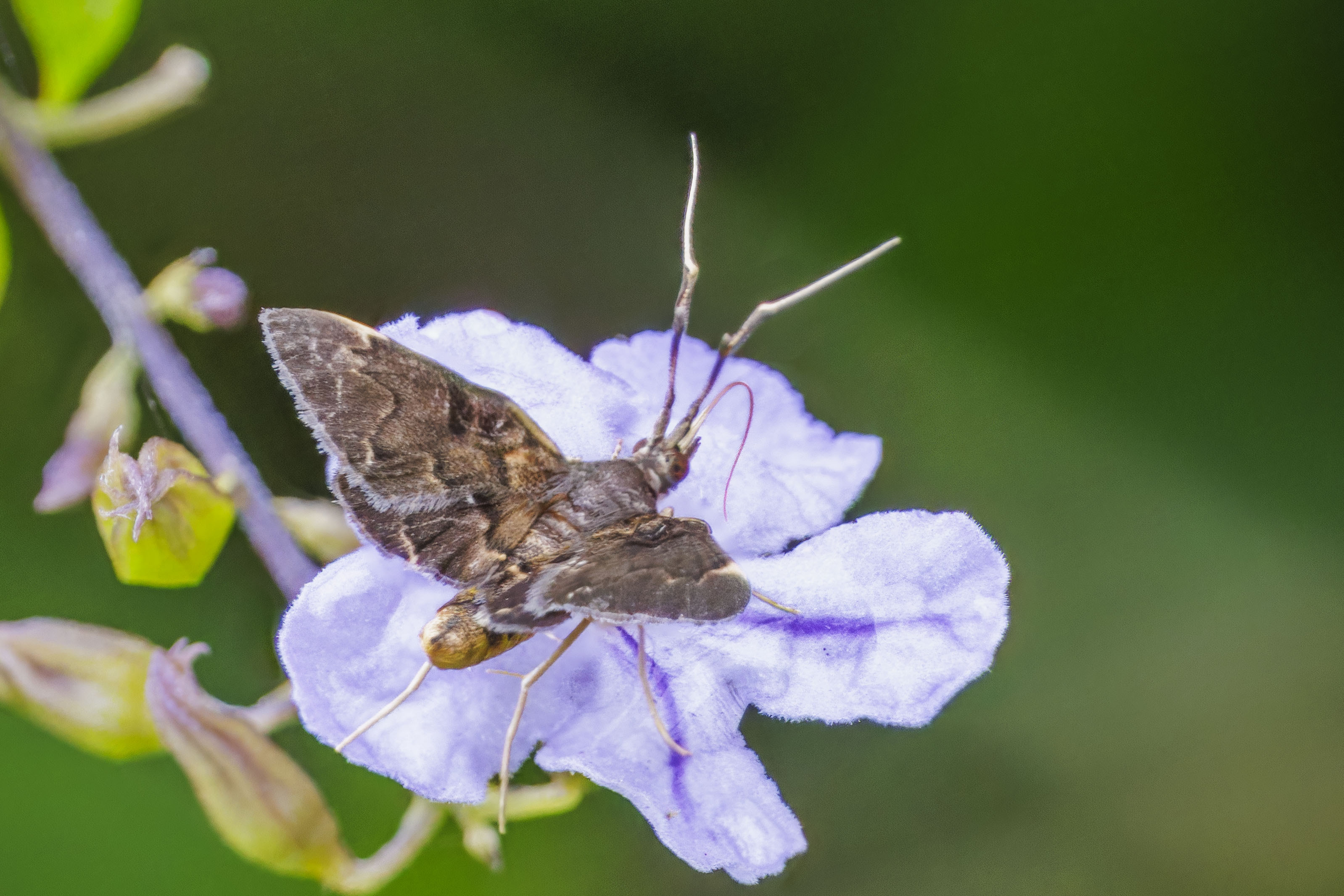
- male, Fiji

Scientific classification
- Domain: Eukaryota
- Kingdom: Animalia
- Phylum: Arthropoda
- Class: Insecta
- Order: Lepidoptera
- Family: Crambidae
- Genus: Piletocera
- Species: P. signiferalis

Binomial name
- Piletocera signiferalis (Wallengren, 1860)

Synonyms
- Isopteryx signiferalis Wallengren, 1860; Ceratoclasis barbicornis C. Felder, R. Felder & Rogenhofer, 1875; Piletocera signiferalis isola J. F. G. Clarke, 1971; Rinecera mirabilis Butler, 1884; Rinecera nigrescens Butler, 1886

= Piletocera signiferalis =

Species of moth

Piletocera signiferalis, the signiferalis grass moth, is a moth in the family Crambidae. It was described by Hans Daniel Johan Wallengren in 1860. It is found in South Africa, as well as on the Austral Islands (Rapa Island, Rurutu), the Caroline Islands, the Cook Islands, the Ellice Islands, the Loyalty Islands, the Marquesas Islands, the New Hebrides, Fiji, the Society Islands (Moorea, Bora Bora, Tahiti, Raiatea) and Tonga.
