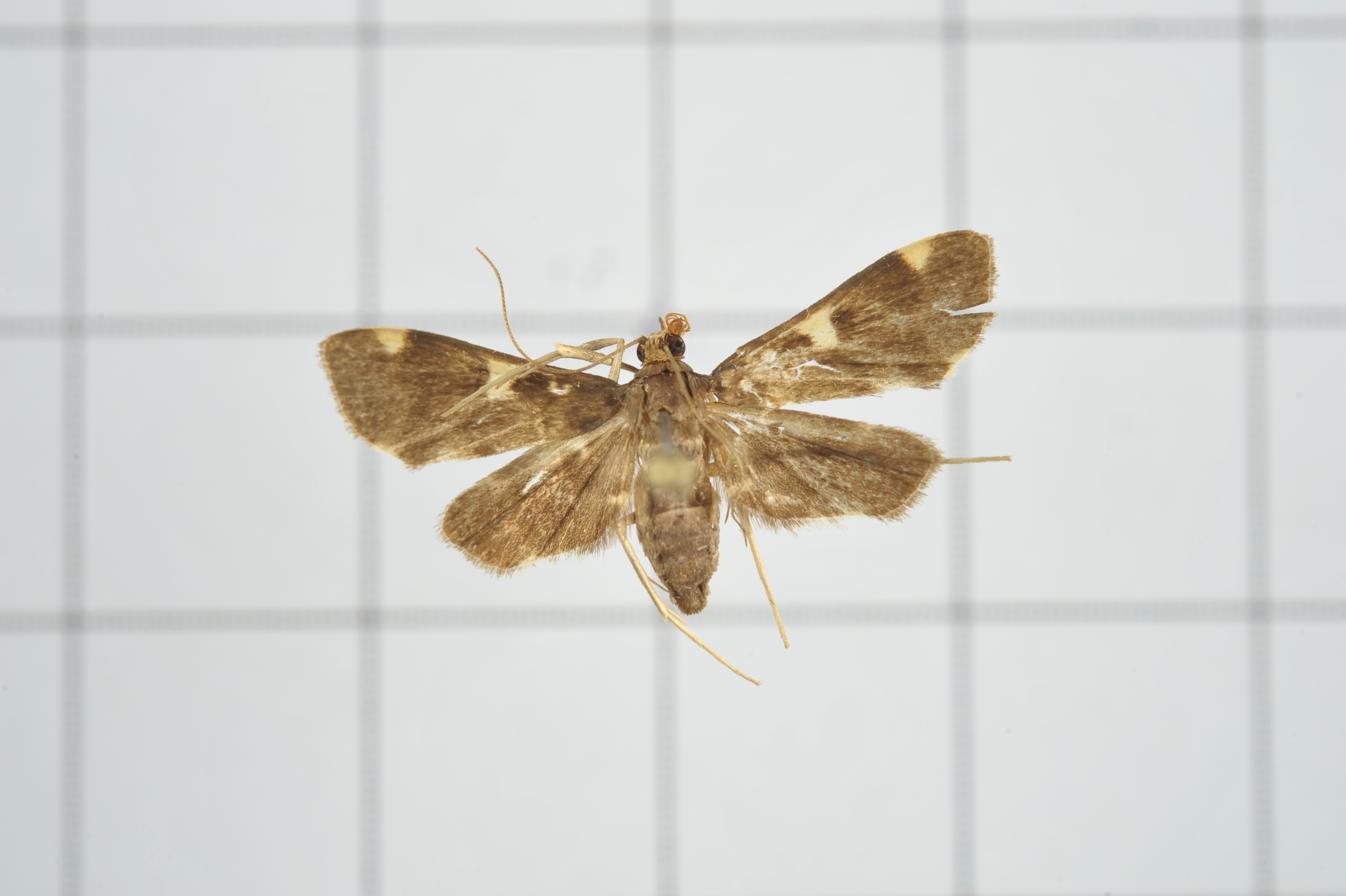
- Piletocera aegimiusalis

Scientific classification
- Kingdom: Animalia
- Phylum: Arthropoda
- Class: Insecta
- Order: Lepidoptera
- Family: Crambidae
- Genus: Piletocera
- Species: P. aegimiusalis

Binomial name
- Piletocera aegimiusalis (Walker, 1859)

Synonyms
- Desmia aegimiusalis Walker, 1859

= Piletocera aegimiusalis =

Species of moth

Piletocera aegimiusalis is a moth in the family Crambidae. It was described by Francis Walker in 1859. It is found on Borneo and in China.
