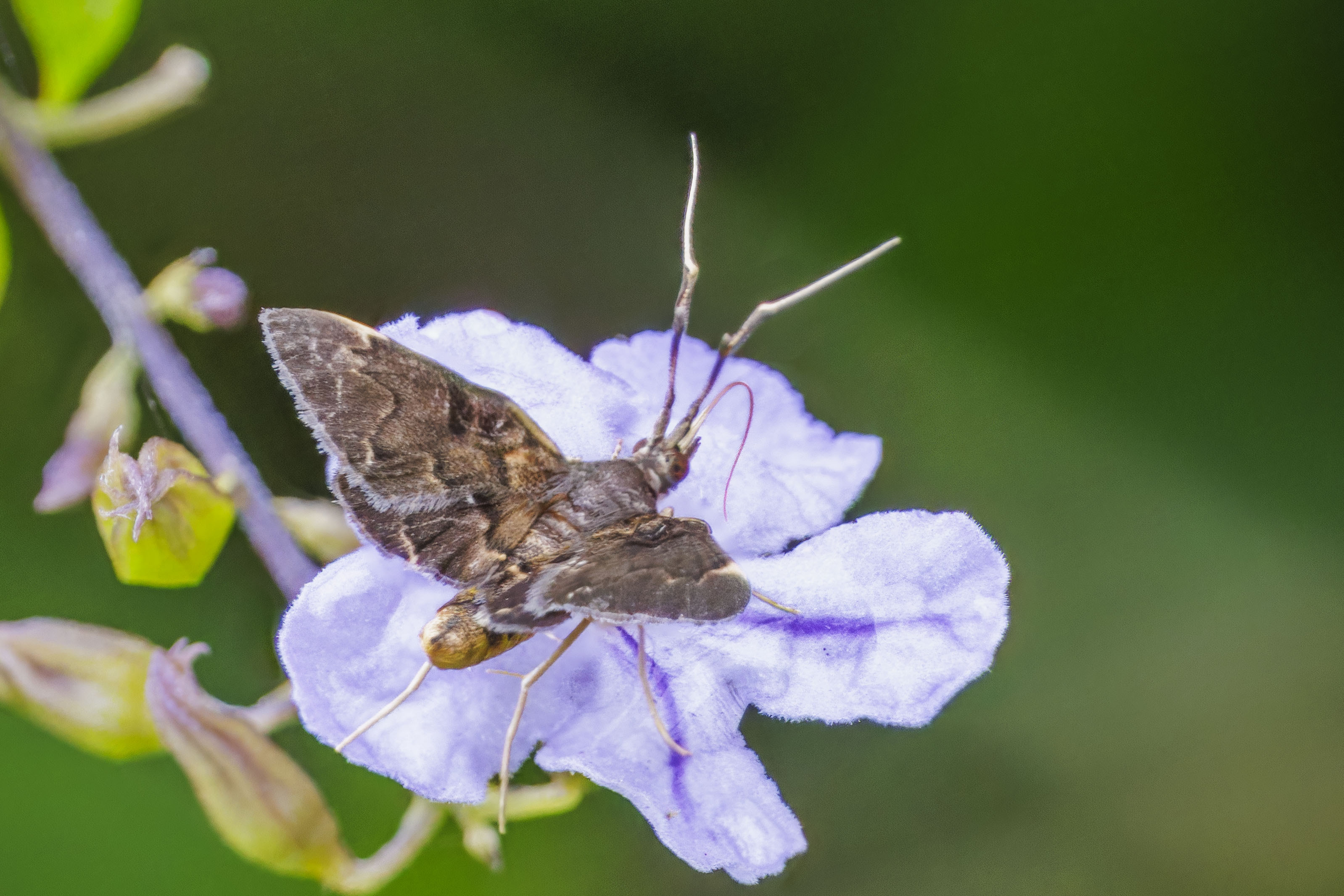
- Piletocera signiferalis male, Fiji

Scientific classification
- Kingdom: Animalia
- Phylum: Arthropoda
- Clade: Pancrustacea
- Class: Insecta
- Order: Lepidoptera
- Family: Crambidae
- Subfamily: Spilomelinae
- Genus: Piletocera; Lederer, 1863

Synonyms
- Sematosopha Meyrick, 1937; Ellogima Turner, 1913; Alutefa Swinhoe, 1900; Penestola Möschler, 1890; Diplotyla Meyrick, 1886; Erebangela Meyrick, 1886; Graphicopoda Butler, 1886; Hormatholepis Butler, 1886; Ptilaeola Meyrick, 1886; Strepsimela Meyrick, 1886; Danaga Moore, 1885; Rinecera Butler, 1884

= Piletocera =

Genus of moths

Piletocera is a genus of moths of the family Crambidae. The genus was first described by Julius Lederer in 1863.

== Species ==
- Piletocera aegimiusalis (Walker, 1859)
- Piletocera aequalis Walker, 1866
- Piletocera agathanalis Schaus, 1924
- Piletocera albescens Rebel, 1915
- Piletocera albicilialis Hampson, 1907
- Piletocera albicinctata Hampson, 1897
- Piletocera albilunata (Warren, 1896)
- Piletocera albimixtalis Hampson, 1917
- Piletocera albipictalis Hampson, 1907
- Piletocera albiventralis Hampson, 1917
- Piletocera analytodes Hampson, 1917
- Piletocera argopis (Meyrick, 1886)
- Piletocera atrata (Pagenstecher, 1900)
- Piletocera batjianalis Strand, 1920
- Piletocera bisignalis Hampson, 1917
- Piletocera bistrigalis Hampson, 1917
- Piletocera chloronota (Meyrick, 1889)
- Piletocera chlorura (Meyrick, 1887)
- Piletocera concisalis (Walker, 1859)
- Piletocera costifascialis Hampson, 1917
- Piletocera costipunctata (Warren, 1896)
- Piletocera cumulalis Hampson, 1907
- Piletocera cyclospila (Meyrick, 1886)
- Piletocera denticostalis Hampson, 1907
- Piletocera discalis Hampson, 1903
- Piletocera discisignalis Hampson, 1917
- Piletocera elongalis (Warren, 1896)
- Piletocera epipercialis Hampson, 1897
- Piletocera erebina Butler, 1886
- Piletocera exuvialis (Snellen, 1890)
- Piletocera flavalis Hampson, 1917
- Piletocera flavidiscalis Hampson, 1917
- Piletocera flavomaculalis Pagenstecher, 1884
- Piletocera flexiguttalis Warren, 1896
- Piletocera fluctualis (Fabricius, 1787)
- Piletocera fulvalis Hampson, 1907
- Piletocera hadesialis Hampson, 1907
- Piletocera hecate Butler, 1886
- Piletocera hemiphaealis (Hampson, 1907)
- Piletocera holophaealis Hampson, 1917
- Piletocera inconspicua Schaus, 1912
- Piletocera inconspicualis Kenrick, 1907
- Piletocera infernalis Hampson, 1907
- Piletocera latalis (Walker, 1866)
- Piletocera leucocephalis Hampson, 1917
- Piletocera leucodelta (Meyrick, 1937)
- Piletocera leucogastralis Hampson, 1917
- Piletocera macroperalis Hampson, 1897
- Piletocera maculifrons Hampson, 1917
- Piletocera meekii (T. P. Lucas, 1894)
- Piletocera megaspilalis Hampson, 1897
- Piletocera melanauges Meyrick, 1886
- Piletocera melesalis (Walker, 1859)
- Piletocera mesophaealis Hampson, 1917
- Piletocera metochrealis Hampson, 1917
- Piletocera micralis Hampson, 1907
- Piletocera microcentra (Meyrick, 1886)
- Piletocera microdontalis Hampson, 1907
- Piletocera nudicornis Hampson, 1897
- Piletocera ochrosema Meyrick, 1886
- Piletocera octosemalis Hampson, 1896
- Piletocera orientalis (Snellen, 1880)
- Piletocera penicillalis Christoph, 1881
- Piletocera phaeocraspedalis Hampson, 1907
- Piletocera plumbicostalis Hampson, 1917
- Piletocera punctatalis (Legrand, 1966)
- Piletocera purpureofusa Hampson, 1917
- Piletocera quadralis (Snellen, 1901)
- Piletocera rechingeri Tams, 1935
- Piletocera reunionalis Viette, 1957
- Piletocera rotundalis Hampson, 1907
- Piletocera ruficeps Hampson, 1917
- Piletocera rufulalis Hampson, 1907
- Piletocera scotochroa Hampson, 1917
- Piletocera signiferalis (Wallengren, 1860)
- Piletocera sodalis (Leech, 1889)
- Piletocera steffanyi Tams, 1935
- Piletocera stenipteralis Hampson, 1917
- Piletocera stygialis Hampson, 1907
- Piletocera torsicostalis Hampson, 1897
- Piletocera ulophanes Meyrick, 1886
- Piletocera violalis Lederer, 1863
- Piletocera violascens Hampson, 1917
- Piletocera viperalis (Guenée, 1862)
- Piletocera xanthosoma Meyrick, 1886

== Former species ==
- Piletocera litanalis (Walker, 1859)
- Piletocera opacalis Rebel, 1926
