= Piletocera leucocephalis =

Scientific classification
- Domain: Eukaryota
- Kingdom: Animalia
- Phylum: Arthropoda
- Class: Insecta
- Order: Lepidoptera
- Family: Crambidae
- Genus: Piletocera
- Species: P. leucocephalis

Binomial name
- Piletocera leucocephalis Hampson, 1917

Species of moth

Piletocera leucocephalis is a moth in the family Crambidae. It was described by George Hampson in 1917. It is found in Papua New Guinea, where it has been recorded from Rook Island in the Bismarck Archipelago.
