= Piletocera latalis =

Scientific classification
- Kingdom: Animalia
- Phylum: Arthropoda
- Class: Insecta
- Order: Lepidoptera
- Family: Crambidae
- Genus: Piletocera
- Species: P. latalis

Binomial name
- Piletocera latalis (Walker, 1866)

Synonyms
- Desmia latalis Walker, 1866; Desmia basalis Walker, 1866

Species of moth

Piletocera latalis is a moth in the family Crambidae. It was described by Francis Walker in 1866. It is found in the Sula Islands of Indonesia.
