= Piletocera stygialis =

Scientific classification
- Domain: Eukaryota
- Kingdom: Animalia
- Phylum: Arthropoda
- Class: Insecta
- Order: Lepidoptera
- Family: Crambidae
- Genus: Piletocera
- Species: P. stygialis

Binomial name
- Piletocera stygialis Hampson, 1907

Species of moth

Piletocera stygialis is a moth in the family Crambidae. It was described by George Hampson in 1907. It is found on the Solomon Islands, where it has been recorded from Choiseul Island.
