= Piletocera inconspicua =

Scientific classification
- Kingdom: Animalia
- Phylum: Arthropoda
- Class: Insecta
- Order: Lepidoptera
- Family: Crambidae
- Genus: Piletocera
- Species: P. inconspicua

Binomial name
- Piletocera inconspicua Schaus, 1912

Species of moth

Piletocera inconspicua is a moth in the family Crambidae. It was described by Schaus in 1912. It is found in Costa Rica.
