= Piletocera albescens =

Scientific classification
- Domain: Eukaryota
- Kingdom: Animalia
- Phylum: Arthropoda
- Class: Insecta
- Order: Lepidoptera
- Family: Crambidae
- Genus: Piletocera
- Species: P. albescens

Binomial name
- Piletocera albescens Rebel, 1915

Species of moth

Piletocera albescens is a moth in the family Crambidae. It was described by Rebel in 1915. It is found on Samoa.
