= Piletocera discalis =

Scientific classification
- Kingdom: Animalia
- Phylum: Arthropoda
- Class: Insecta
- Order: Lepidoptera
- Family: Crambidae
- Genus: Piletocera
- Species: P. discalis

Binomial name
- Piletocera discalis Hampson, 1903

Species of moth

Piletocera discalis is a moth in the family Crambidae. It was described by George Hampson in 1903. It is found in Sri Lanka.
