= Piletocera meekii =

Scientific classification
- Domain: Eukaryota
- Kingdom: Animalia
- Phylum: Arthropoda
- Class: Insecta
- Order: Lepidoptera
- Family: Crambidae
- Genus: Piletocera
- Species: P. meekii

Binomial name
- Piletocera meekii (T. P. Lucas, 1894)

Synonyms
- Diplotyla meekii T. P. Lucas, 1894; Diplotyla javanalis Snellen, 1901; Diplotyla vestigialis Warren, 1896

Species of moth

Piletocera meekii is a moth in the family Crambidae. It was described by Thomas Pennington Lucas in 1894. It is found on the Indonesean island of Java and the Australian state of Queensland.
