= Piletocera viperalis =

Scientific classification
- Kingdom: Animalia
- Phylum: Arthropoda
- Class: Insecta
- Order: Lepidoptera
- Family: Crambidae
- Genus: Piletocera
- Species: P. viperalis

Binomial name
- Piletocera viperalis (Guenée, 1862)

Synonyms
- Stenia viperalis Guenée, 1862

Species of moth

Piletocera viperalis is a moth in the family Crambidae. It was described by Achille Guenée in 1862. It is found on Réunion.
