= South Halmahera Regency =

Regency in North Maluku, Indonesia

South Halmahera Regency Kabupaten Halmahera Selatan
- Regency
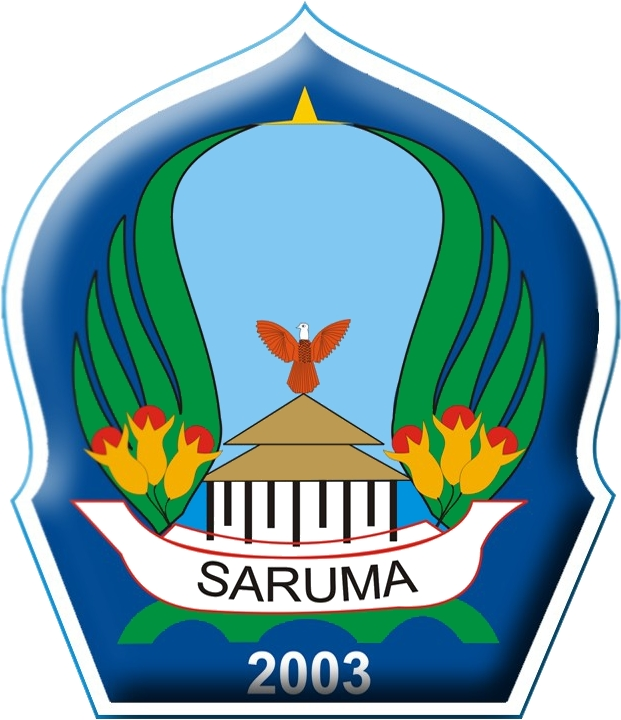
- Coat of arms
- Motto: Saruma (One House)

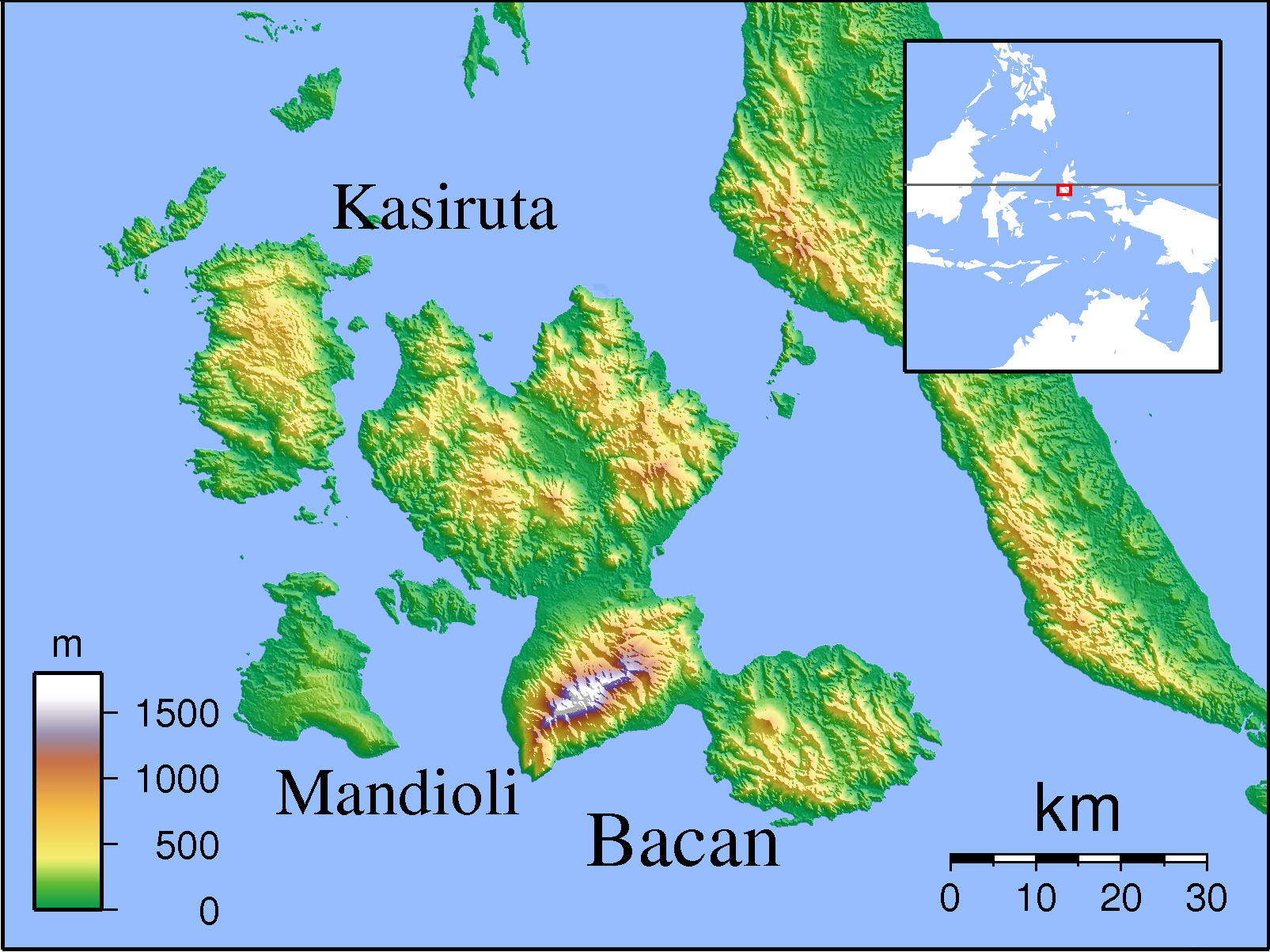
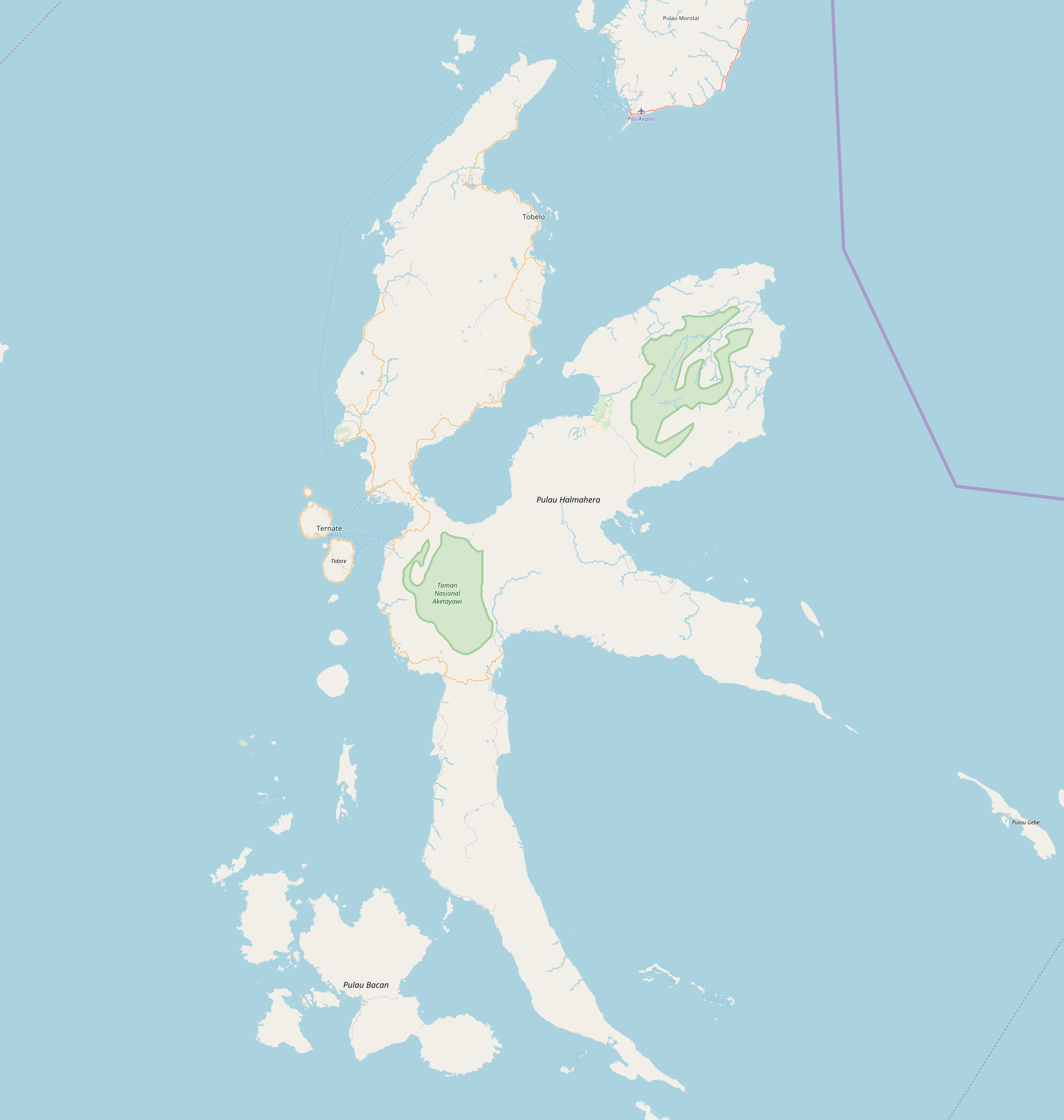
- Location of the Bacan Islands and the southern peninsula of Halmahera, both part of South Halmahera Regency in the Maluku Islands, Indonesia South Halmahera Regency (North Maluku) South Halmahera Regency (Halmahera) South Halmahera Regency (Indonesia)
- Coordinates: 0.3955°S 127.9083°E
- Country: Indonesia
- Province: North Maluku
- Capital: Labuha

Government
  - Regent: Hasan Ali Bassam Kasuba
  - Vice Regent: Helmi Umar Muchsin

Area
  - Total: 8,779.32 km^{2} (3,389.71 sq mi)

Population (mid 2025 Estimate)
  - Total: 258,564
  - Density: 29.4515/km^{2} (76.2790/sq mi)
- Time zone: UTC+9 (IEST)
- Area code: (+62) 927
- Website: halselkab.go.id

South Halmahera Regency (Indonesian: Kabupaten Halmahera Selatan; Indonesian pronunciation: [kabuˌpat̪ɛn halmaˌhera səˈlat̪an]) is a regency of North Maluku Province, Indonesia. It lies partly on Halmahera Island (occupying most of the southern peninsula of that island) and partly on smaller islands to the west and south of Halmahera. It covers a land area of 8,779.32 km^{2}, and at the 2010 Census it had a population of 198,911 people, while the 2020 Census showed that this had risen to 248,395 and the official estimate in mid 2025 was 258,564 (comprising 133,453 males and 125,111 females). The capital lies at the town of Labuha on Bacan Island.

== Islands ==
Besides the southern part of Halmahera Island, the regency includes a number of archipelagoes and islands. These comprise:

- Obi Islands, including Obira (main), Bisa, Obilatu and other small islands, comprising in all five kecamatan with 55,010 people in mid 2025.
- Bacan Islands, including:
  - Bacan Island itself, comprising 7 kecamatan with 89,816 people (in mid 2025)
  - Bacan Lomang Island, comprising 1 kecamatan with 7,808 people
  - Mandioli, comprising 2 kecamatan with 10,912 people
  - Kasiruta, comprising 2 kecamatan with 11,024 people
- Kayoa Group, comprising 4 kecamatan with 21,996 people
- Makian, comprising 2 kecamatan with 12,323 people
- the southern peninsula of Halmahera Island (the area is known as Gane), comprising 6 kecamatan with 49,674 people in 2025 (including the Joronga Islands off the southern tip of Halmahera Island).

== Administration ==
The regency is divided into thirty districts (kecamatan), tabulated below with their areas and their populations at the 2010 Census and 2020 Census, together with the official estimates for mid 2025. The table also includes the name of the administrative centre and the number of administrative villages (all classed as rural desa) and of named islands in each district and its post code.

Kode Wilayah	Name of District (kecamatan)	English name	Area in km^{2}	Pop'n Census 2010	Pop'n Census 2020'	Pop'n Estimate mid 2025	Admin centre	No. of villages	No. of islands	Post code	Island or Group
82.04.05	Obi Selatan	South Obi	1,021.02	12,128	12,178	15,815	Wayaloar	8	4	97792	Obi Islands
82.04.06	Obi		910.59	14,125	20,538	19,047	Laiwui	9	12	97792	Obi Islands
82.04.28	Obi Barat	West Obi	89.19	3,586	5,211	5,830	Jikohai	6	6	97792	Obi Islands
82.04.29	Obi Timur	East Obi	636.23	3,389	3,705	4,048	Sum	4	14	97792	Obi Islands
82.04.30	Obi Utara	North Obi	160.69	8,227	9,128	10,270	Madapolo	7	6	97792	Obi Islands
Sub-totals	Obi Islands		2,817.72	41,455	50,760	55,010		34	42	97792	Obi Islands
82.04.08	Bacan		304.69	19,092	27,045	29,227	Labuha	14	3	97791	Bacan Islands
82.04.19	Mandioli Selatan	South Mandioli	138.81	5,798	6,936	7,186	Jiko	6	-	97791	Mandioli
82.04.20	Mandioli Utara	North Mandioli	96.80	2,990	3,809	3,726	Indong	6	7	97791 ^{(a)}	Mandioli
82.04.17	Bacan Selatan	South Bacan	169.21	13,265	19,560	21,971	Mandaong	10	-	97791	Bacan Islands
82.04.18	Batang Lomang ^{(b)}	Batang Lomang Islands	55.81	6,177	7,655	7,808	Bajo	8	13	97790	Batang Lomang Islands
82.04.07	Bacan Timur	East Bacan	463.50	9,051	12,794	13,811	Babang	10	8	97791	Bacan Islands
82.04.21	Bacan Timur Selatan	Southeast Bacan	321.13	6,460	7,493	8,459	Wayaua	7	1	97791	Bacan Islands
82.04.22	Bacan Timur Tengah	East Central Bacan	276.28	5,229	6,158	6,579	Bibinoi	7	2	97791	Bacan Islands
82.04.09	Bacan Barat	West Bacan	143.70	3,549	4,327	4,602	Indari	7	49	97791	Bacan Islands
82.04.15	Kasiruta Barat ^{(c)}	West Kasiruta	272.98	4,521	5,865	6,034	Palamea	10	25	97790	Kasiruta
82.04.16	Kasiruta Timur	East Kasiruta	211.45	3,847	4,865	4,990	Loleojaya	8	6	97790	Kasiruta
82.04.14	Bacan Barat Utara	Northwest Bacan	264.94	4,096	5,010	5.167	Yaba	8	1	97791	Bacan Islands
Sub-totals	Bacan Islands		2,719.30	84,075	111,517	119,560		101	115	9779x	Bacan Islands
82.04.02	Kayoa		87.62	8,180	9,057	8,614	Guruapin	14	49	97780	Kayoa Islands
82.04.11	Kayoa Barat ^{(d)}	West Kayoa	27.07	3,469	4,336	4,042	Busua	4	5	97781	Kayoa Islands
82.04.12	Kayoa Selatan	South Kayoa	25.90	5,856	6,822	6,559	Laluin	6	9	97780	Kayoa Islands
82.04.13	Kayoa Utara	North Kayoa	39.22	2,671	2,896	2,781	Laromabati	6	3	97781	Kayoa Islands
Sub-totals	Kayoa Islands		179.81	20,176	23,111	21,996		30	66	9778x	Kayoa Islands
82.04.01	Pulau Makian ^{(e)}	Makian Island	55.50	8,977	10,032	8,774	Kota	15	1	97785	Makian
82.04.10	Makian Barat ^{(e)}	West Makian	35.54	3,417	3,968	3,549	Mateketen	7	-	97784	Makian
Sub-totals	Makian Island		91.04	12,394	14,000	12,323		22	1	9778x	Makian Island
82.04.04	Gane Barat	West Gane	493.67	7,972	10,019	9,719	Saketa	10	7	97782	Halmahera
82.04.23	Gane Barat Selatan	Southwest Gane	252.55	5,545	6,796	7,087	Gane Dalam	8	19	97782	Halmahera
82.04.24	Gane Barat Utara	Northwest Gane	501.69	6,027	7,336	7,289	Dolik	12	-	97789	Halmahera
82.04.25	Kepulauan Joronga	Joronga Islands	148.93	5,264	7,203	7,146	Kukupang	7	30 ^{(f)}	97786	Joronga Islands
82.04.03	Gane Timur	East Gane	661.65	8,729	9,253	9,678	Maffa	12	1	97783	Halmahera
82.04.27	Gane Timur Tengah	East Central Gane	309.67	3,796	4,354	4,719	Bisui	8	2	97788	Halmahera
82.04.26	Gane Timur Selatan ^{(g)}	Southeast Gane	284.20	3,478	4,104	4,037	Gane Luar	5	85	97787	Halmahera
Sub-totals	Gane and offshore islands		2,652.36	40,811	49,065	49,674		62	144	9778x	Gane and Islands

Notes: (a) except for Bobo desa, which has a postcode of 97792. (b) formally called Kepulauan Batanglomang; situated between Bacan and Mandioli Islands.
(c) includes Lata Lata Island (27.9 km^{2}, with 1,201 inhabitants in 2020), located to the northwest of Kasiruta Island, and comprising two desa - Lata Lata and Sidanga.
(d) Kayoa Barat (essentially Pulau Muari, but also includes the four small offshore islets of Pulau Guaigo, Pulau Guaigo Kecil, Pulau Intan and Pulau Tamotamo) actually lies closer to Kasiruta Island than to the rest of the Kayoa group; it is geographically adjacent to Lata Lata Island, part of Kasiruta Barat District.
(e) Makian Island is a stratovolcano, like the islands to the north of it (such as Moti, Mare, Tidore, Ternate and Hiri), and unlike those to the south (like Kayoa and the Bacan Islands).
(f) comprising the villages (desa) of Gonone, Kukupang, Kurunga, Liboba Hijrah, Pulau Gala, Tawabi and Yomen; the largest islands are Pulau Damar (or Kukupang) and Pulau Yoruga (or Joronga Island).
(g) includes the Widi Islands off the east coast of the Gane Peninsula.

== Languages ==
The various South Halmahera languages are a branch of Austronesian languages.

== Economy ==
South Halmahera has been designated by provincial governor Abdul Ghani Kasuba as a region for tourism development. The Widi International Fishing Tournament was founded for this purpose. Kasuba also successfully negotiated for the China-based Jinchun Group to build a nine-trillion rupiah nickel smelter in the Obi Islands.

The Mal Saruma Town Square in Tuwokona, South Bacan, was built beginning in 2019 using approximately Rp58 billion in regional government funding. By April 2025, ANTARA reported that the complex was abandoned and no longer in use, with damaged escalators and a collapsed ceiling.
