= List of rulers of Maluku =

This is a list of rulers of Maluku from proto-historical times until the present. Maluku (or Moluccas) is an archipelago east of Sulawesi (Celebes) in Indonesia. The four sultanates of Ternate, Tidore, Jailolo, and Bacan were considered descendants of a legendary figure called Jafar Sadik and formed a ritual quadripartition. There were several other small kingdoms in northern part of Maluku, such as Loloda and Moro, but both had little or no influence in the region. Drawing wealth from the spice production and trade with other parts of Asia, Ternate and Tidore lorded over extensive realms which stretched from Sulawesi to Papua, while Jailolo and Bacan merely had local significance. They fell under Portuguese or Spanish influence in the sixteenth century, superseded by Dutch impact in the seventeenth century. The sultanates were subordinated to the Dutch colonial state until 1942 when the Japanese occupied Indonesia. After the outbreak of the Indonesian revolution they belonged to the Dutch-approved quasi-state East Indonesia from 1946 to 1950 when they were incorporated in the unitary Indonesian state.

== Sultans of Bacan ==
- Muhammad Bakir (c. 1465) [son of Jafar Sadik]
- Zainal Abidin (late 15th century or early 16th century) [son]
- Yusuf (before 1512-c. 1520)
- Alauddin I (c. 1520-1557)
- Dom João (Hairun) (1557-1577) [son]
- Dom Henrique (1577-1581) [son]
- Alauddin II (1581-c. 1609) [son of Dom João]
- Nurusalat (c. 1609-1649) [son]
- Muhammad Ali (1649-1655) [son]
- Alauddin III (1655-1701) [son]
- Dutch protectorate 1667-1942/1946
- Musa Malikuddin (1701-1715) [brother]
- Kie Nasiruddin (1715-1732) [son of Alauddin II]
- Hamza Tarafan Nur (1732-1741) [nephew]
- Muhammad Sahaddin (1741-1780) [grandson of Musa Malikuddin]
- Skandar Alam (1780-1788) [nephew]
- Muhammad Badaruddin (1788-1797) [son of Kie Nasiruddin]
- Kamarullah (1797-1826) [nephew]
- Muhammad Hayatuddin Kornabé (1826-1861) [son]
- Muhammad Sadik (1862-1889) [son]
- Muhammad Usman (1900-1935) [son]
- Muhammad Muhsin (1935-1983) [son]
- Incorporation in Indonesian unitary state 1950
- Muhammad Gahral (titular sultan 1983-2009) [son]
- Muhammad Abdurrahim (titular sultan 2010–2023) [son]

== Sultans of Jailolo ==
=== Legendary list ===
- Darajati
- Fataruba
- Tarakabun
- Niru
- Yusuf I
- Dias
- Bantari
- Sugi
- Hasanuddin
- Husain
- Yusuf II
- Doa (oldest son of Yusuf II; brother of Prince Printah and Prince Gugu Alam)
- Gugu Alam (male offspring of Yusuf II)
- Syah Mardan
- Sahunsa
- Talabuddin

=== Historically documented list ===
- Sultan Yusuf I (before 1514-1530) [descendant of Darajati]
- Kaicil Firuz Alauddin alias Tahubo (1532-1534) [son]
- Sultan Tarkibun alias Katarabumi (1534-1552) [nephew of Yusuf]
- Kaicili Guzarate alias Niru (1552-c. 1560) [son]
- Sultan Kodrat alias Kolano Yusuf II (?-c. 1605)
- Sultan Doa (c. 1606-1613) [son]
- Raja Jailolo (Kaicili Saiuddin Raja Buka?) (1613?-1656) [son]
- Kaicil Alam (Jogugu [regent] c. 1679-1684) [son; married Princess of Ternate]
- Rule of Ternate 1656-1797
- Muhammad Arif Bila (1797-1806) [descendant of brother of Sultan Doa; Prince Gugu Alam]
- British occupation 1799-1802
- Muhammad Asgar (1806-1811) [son; rule of Ternate]
- Muhammad Hajuddin Syah (1818-1825; died 1843) [brother]
- Muhammad Asgar ('Sultan Ceram' 1825-1832; died 1839) [second term]
- Dano Baba Hasan (1876-1877) [grandnephew]
- Rule of Ternate 1803-1950
- Abdulah Harjanto Sjah (titular sultan 2003-2010) [descendant of Dano Baba Hasan; rule of Ternate]

== Rulers of Ternate ==
=== Pre-Sultanate rulers ===
- Cico (king [kolano] 1257-1277)
- Poit (1277-1284) [son]
- Siale (1284-1298) [son]
- Kalabata (1298-1304) [son]
- Komalo (1304-1317) [son]
- Patsaranga-ma-lamo (1317-1322) [brother]
- Siding Arif (1322-1331) [nephew]
- Paji-ma-lamo (1331-1332) [brother]
- Syah Alam (1332-1343) [son of Patsaranga-ma-lamo]
- Tolu-ma-lamo (1343-1347) [brother]
- Boheyat I (1347-1350) [son of Siding Arif]
- Ngolo-ma-Caya (1350-1357) [brother]
- Momole (1357-1359) [brother]
- Gapi-ma-lamo (1359-1372) [brother]
- Gapi Baguna I (1372-1377) [brother]
- Komalo Pulu (1377-1432) [son of Tolu-ma-lamo]
- Gapi Baguna II (1432-1465) [son]
- Marhum (1465-1486) [son]

=== Sultan ===
Sultan of Ternate
- Imperial
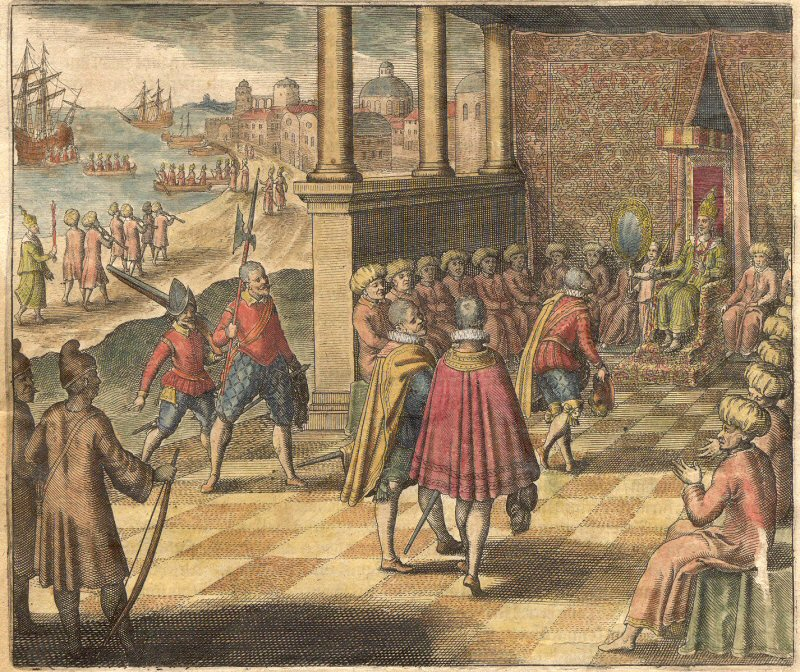
- Sultan Baabullah during Francis Drake's visit in 1579, Illustration by Theodor de Bry.

Details
- Style: His Highness
- First monarch: Zainal Abidin
- Last monarch: Muhammad Usman Syah (Last Sultan to rule Ternate); Muhammad Jabir Syah (Honorary Sultan)
- Formed: c. 1486; 540 years ago
- Abolished: Last Sultan dethroned September 23, 1915; 111 years ago; Honorary Sultan 1975; 51 years ago
- Residences: Known residences: Gammalamma (1575–1606); Tolucco (1661–1810); Ternate Palace (1813–1975)
- Appointer: Hereditary (1486–1914); Dutch government (1929)
- Pretender: Sjarifuddin Sjah (titular Sultan of Ternate 2016-2019)

The first known Kolano (ruler) of Ternate to convert to Islam was Marhum. According to François Valentijn's account, Marhum was the son and successor of the seventeenth King Gapi Baguna II (r. 1432-1465), a pre-Islamic ruler of Ternate. His island kingdom was one of the four realms that traditionally existed in North Maluku, the others being Tidore, Bacan, and Jailolo. Reports were told by Javanese traders who came to the island, that native Ternateans were able to read out words from the letters of the Qur'an, it proves that the first tenets of Islam had entered North Molluccan society.

The first ruler of Ternate to adopt the title of Sultan was Zainal Abidin of Ternate, His life is only described in sources dating from the 16th century or later. According to the versions of François Valentijn's account, Zainal Abidin was the son of Marhum, meanwhile according to Malay Annals like the Hikayat Tanah Hitu by Rijali (written before 1657 and later adjusted in c. 1700) described that Zainal Abidin was the first Ternate ruler to convert to Islam. Many Muslim Javanese traders frequented Ternate at the time and incited the king to learn more about the new creed, to establish an Islamic governance for his kingdom. In c. 1495, he traveled with his companion Hussein to study Islam in Giri (Gresik) on Java's north coast, where Sunan Giri kept a well-known madrasa. While there, he won renown as Sultan Bualawa, or Sultan of Cloves. According to the Hikayat Tanah Hitu, Zainal Abidin stopped in Bima in Sumbawa on his way back to Maluku. He and his crew got into trouble with the local king and a fight took place where a Bimanese wounded Zainal Abidin with his spear. The bodyguards of the ruler brought him back to the ship, though he died on board. The account of François Valentijn, on the contrary, insists that he survived the battle and made it back to Ternate. On his return, he replaced the royal title Kolano with Sultan, and it may have been now that he adopted the Islamic name Zainal Abidin. He brought back a mubaligh from Java named Tuhubahahul to propagate the Islamic faith and created a Bobato (headman) to assist in all matters relating to the rule of Islamic law across the Sultanate.

The second ruler of Ternate to claim the title of Sultan was Bayan Sirrullah. He ruled from around 1500 to 1521 and saw the arrival of Portuguese to the Islands of Maluku. Bayan Sirrullah, also known as Abu Lais (in Portuguese sources, Boleife), was the eldest son of the first sultan of Ternate, Zainal Abidin. Islam had been accepted by the local elites of North Maluku in the second half of the 15th century, as a consequence of the importance of Muslim traders in the archipelago.

Under the reign of Baabullah of Ternate, Ternate saw its golden age after Baabullah's victory in defeating the Portuguese. He was commonly known as the Ruler of 72 (Inhabited) Islands in eastern Indonesia, including most of the Maluku Islands, Sangihe and parts of Sulawesi, with influences as far as Solor, East Sumbawa, Mindanao, and the Papuan Islands. His reign inaugurated a period of free trade in the spices and forest products that gave Maluku a significant role in Asian commerce.

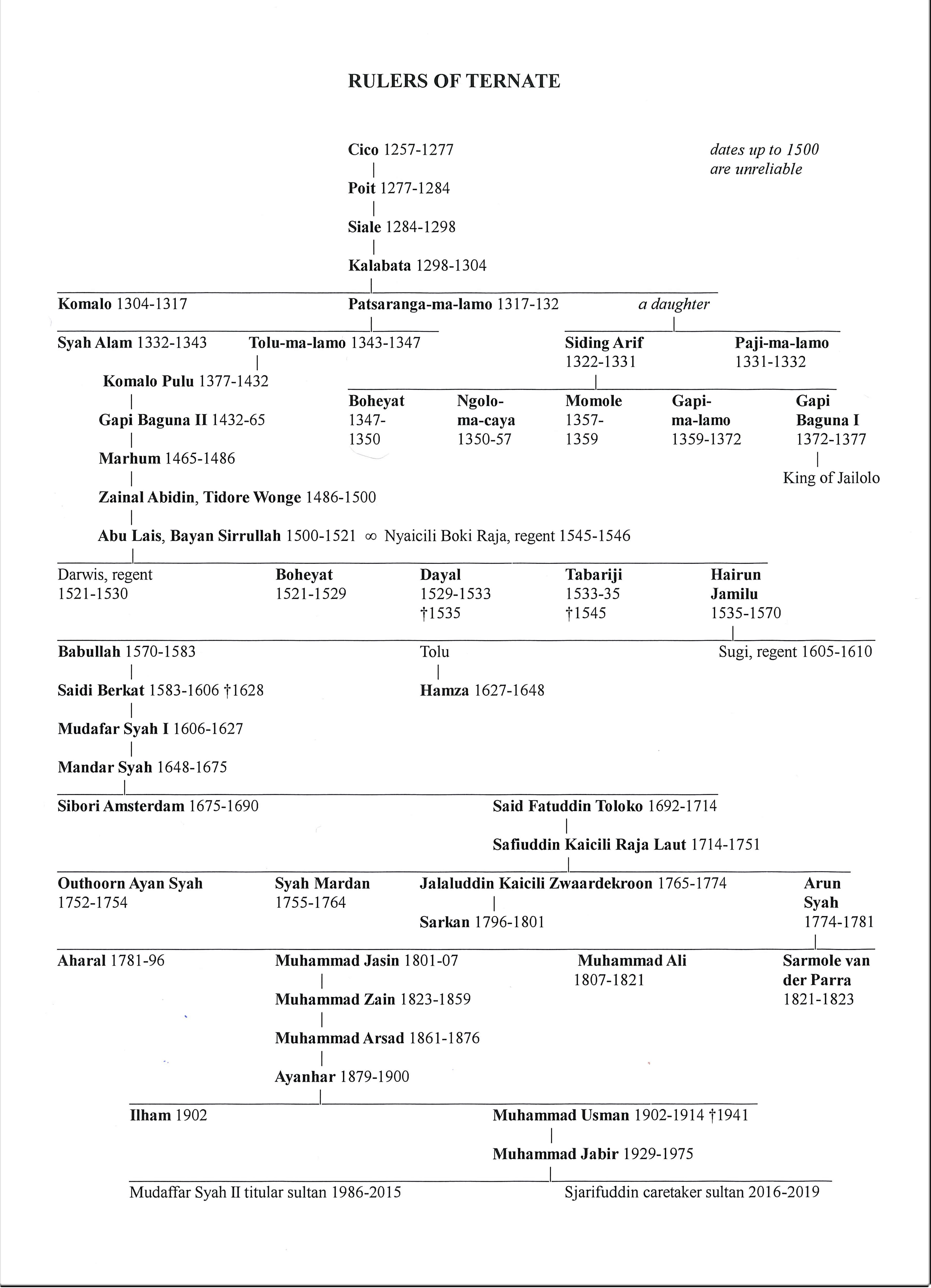
Genealogy of the rulers of Ternate

The last Sultan who ruled Ternate according to the old institutions was Muhammad Usman Syah. Muhammad Usman succeeded to the throne in February 1902 after the death of his father in 1900, and a brief reign by his brother. He was arrested and dethroned by the Dutch colonial authorities on 23 September 1915 because of his opposition to the increasing colonial interference in his kingdom and the subsequent minor uprising in Jailolo in September 1914, whereby the controleur G.K.B. Agerbeek and Lieutenant C.F. Ouwerling were murdered. The Dutch colonial government later enthroned an honorary sultan of Ternate, Muhammad Jabir in 1929, The sultanate was de facto abolished under the government of Indonesia around 1949 to 1950.

List of sultans

- Zainal Abidin (1486-1500) [son; first sultan]
- Bayan Sirrullah (1500-1521) [son]
- Boheyat II (1522-1529) [son]
- Dayal (1529-1533; died 1536) [brother]
- Tabariji (1533-1535) [brother]
- Hairun Jamilu (1535-1570) [brother]
- Babullah (1570-1583) [son]
- Saidi Berkat (1583-1606; died 1628) [son]
- Mudafar Syah I (1607-1627) [son]
- Hamza (1627-1648) [grandson of Hairun Jamilu]
- Mandar Syah (1648-1675) [son of Muzaffar Syah I]
- Sibori Amsterdam (1675-1689) [son]

Dutch protectorate 1683-1915

- Said Fatuddin Toloko (1689-1714) [brother]
- Kaicili Raja Laut (1714-1751) [son]
- Outhoorn Ayan Syah (1752-1755) [son]
- Amir Iskandar Muda Syah, Syah Mardan (1755-1764) [brother]
- Jalaluddin, Kaicili Zwaardekroon (1764-1774) [brother]
- Arun Syah (1774-1781) [brother]
- Aharal (1781-1796) [son]
- Sarkan (1796-1801) [son of Jalaluddin Kaicili Zwaardekroon]
- Muhammad Jasin (1801-1807) [son of Arun Syah]
- Muhammad Ali (1807-1821; died 1824) [brother]
- Sarmole van der Parra (1821-1823) [brother]
- Muhammad Zain 1823-1859) [son of Muhammad Jasin]
- Muhammad Arsad (1861-1876) [son]
- Ayanhar (1879-1900) [son]
- Ilham (1900-1902) [son]
- Muhammad Usman (1902-1915; died 1941) [brother]
- Interregnum 1915-1929
- Iskandar Muhammad Jabir Syah (1929-1975) [son]

Incorporation into Indonesian unitary state 1950

- Mudaffar Sjah II (titular sultan 1986-2015) [son]
- Sjarifuddin Sjah (titular sultan 2016-2019) [brother]

== Kings and sultans of Tidore ==
Sultan of Tidore
- Provincial
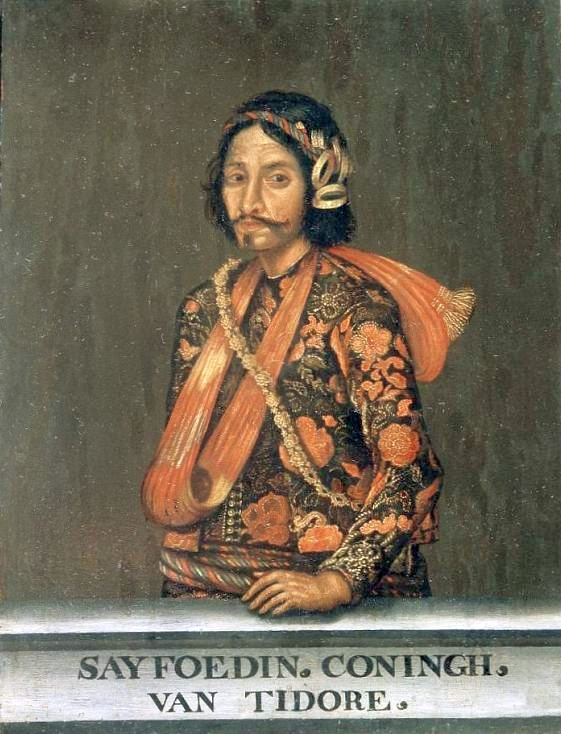
- Portrait of Sultan Saifuddin of Tidore (r. 1657-1689). c. 17th century

Details
- First monarch: Jamaluddin (first ruler to claim the title of Sultan)
- Last monarch: Zainal Abidin Syah (last sultan to have executive power until 1949)
- Formed: 15th century
- Abolished: de facto 1949; de jure 1967
- Residence: Known residence: Fort Tohula (1662–1806)
- Appointer: Hereditary (15th century–1949)
- Pretender: Husain Syah (titular sultan 2014-) [descendant of Ahmad Saifuddin Alting]

The title of Sultan was first claimed by the former Kolano (King) of Tidore, Ciri Leliatu known later as Sultan Jamaluddin. According to the Malay chronicle of Hikayat Ternate, Ciri Leliatu was the son of Matagena, a Malay lord who expelled his predecessor Kolano Sele and acquired kingship over the island. According to even later sources, he was descended from a line of Muslim qadis and thus started a new royal lineage, and eventually died in Gotowasi village in Halmahera. He is nevertheless counted among the pre-Islamic rulers. Matagena's son was Ciri Leliatu, also called Ciriliyati, who succeeded to the Kolano-ship in the late 15th century. An Arab called Syekh Mansur came to Tidore and converted him to Islam, whereby he received the Islamic name Sultan Jamaluddin. The eldest son of the king was named after the preacher, and later succeeded his father as Sultan al-Mansur. Al-Mansur was, according to later historical tradition, the son of the first Muslim ruler of Tidore, Ciri Leliatu. He was named after Syekh Mansur, an Arab who persuaded his father to convert to Islam. As he later told Spanish visitors, his father had been killed during a journey to Buru Island, which was normally a dependency of the rivalling Sultanate of Ternate. According to European sources, Islam was accepted by the North Malukan elite in about the 1460s-1470s. Ciri Leliatu's son Sultan al-Mansur ruled when the Portuguese first visited Maluku in 1512, and met the remnants of the Magellan expedition in 1521.

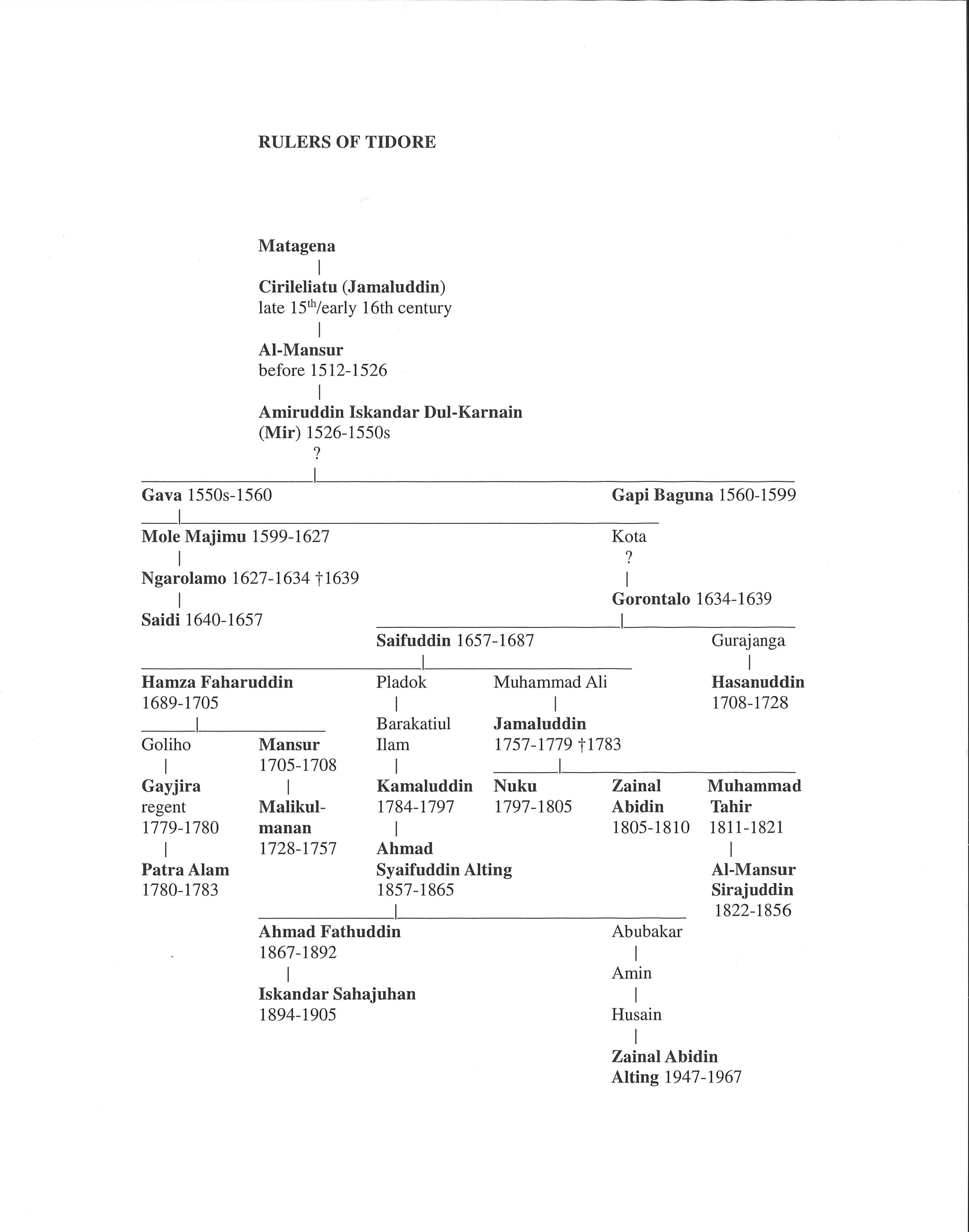
Genealogy of the rulers of Tidore

Under the reign of Sultan Saifuddin (1657-1689), the Sultanate of Tidore was an ally of the Dutch East India Company (VOC), it was until the nineteenth Sultan of Tidore, Nuku Muhammad Amiruddin attacked the VOC in 1780.

The last sultan of Tidore was Zainal Abidin Syah who reigned from 1947 to 1967. During his reign, the anti-feudalist movements led to the abolition of old monarchical institutions in 1949.

List of rulers

- Sah Jati (king [kolano]) [son of Jafar Sadik]
- Busamuangi [son]
- Suhu
- Balibungah
- Duku Madoya
- Kie Matiti
- Sele
- Matagena
- Jamaluddin, Ciri Leliatu (sultan) [son]
- Al-Mansur (before 1512-1526) [son]
- Amiruddin Iskandar Dul-Karna’in (1526-c. 1556) [son]
- Kie Mansur (?-?)
- Gaua, Iskandar Sani (?) (?-1560)
- Kaicili Bungua (Gapi Baguna?) (fl. 1564-1570)
- Gapi Baguna (1560-1599) [brother of Gaua]
- Mole Majimu (1599-1627) [son of Gaua]
- Ngarolamo (1627-1634; died 1639) [son]
- Gorontalo (1634-1639) [nephew of Mole Majimu]
- Saidi (1640-1657) [son of Ngarolamo]
- Saifuddin, Golofino (1657-1687) [son of Gorontalo]

Dutch protectorate 1657/1780-1905

- Hamza Faharuddin (1689-1705) [son]
- Abul Falalal Mansur (1705-1708) [son]
- Hasanuddin (1708-1728) [grandson of Gorontalo]
- Amir Muiduddin Malikulmanan (1728-1757) [son of Abdul Falahi Mansur]
- Amir Muhammad Masud Jamaluddin (1757-1779; died 1783) [grandson of Saifuddin]
- Gayjira (regent 1779-1780) [grandson of Hamza Faharuddin]
- Patra Alam (1780-1783) [son]
- Hairul Alam Kamaluddin (1784-1797) [great-grandson of Saifuddin]
- Nuku, Muhammad al-Mabus Amiruddin Syah (1797-1805) [son of Jamaluddin]
- Zainal Abidin (1805-1810) [brother]
- Muhammad Tahir (1811-1821) [brother]
- Ahmad al-Mansur Sirajuddin (1822-1856) [son]
- Ahmad Saifuddin Alting (1856-1865) [son of Kamaluddin]
- Said Ahmad Fathuddin Syah (1867-1892) [son]
- Iskandar Sahajuhan (1893-1905) [son]
- Regency 1905-1947
- Zainal Abidin Alting (1947-1967) [descendant of Ahmad Saifuddin Alting]

Incorporation in Indonesian unitary state 1950

- Haji Djafar Dano Junus (titular sultan 1999-2012) [descendant of Nuku]
- Husain Syah (titular sultan 2014-) [descendant of Ahmad Saifuddin Alting]

== See also ==
- Pre-Islamic rulers of Ternate
- Sultanate of Ternate
- Sultanate of Tidore
- Sultanate of Jailolo
- Sultanate of Bacan
- Dutch East India Company
- List of governors of Maluku

== Bibliography ==
- Andaya, Leonard Y. (1993) The world of Maluku. Honolulu: Hawaii University Press.
- Clercq, F.S.A. de (1890) Bijdragen tot de kennis der Residentie Ternate. Leiden: Brill.
- Fraassen, Christiaan van (1987) Ternate, de Molukken en de Indonesische Archipel. Leiden: Rijksuniversiteit the Leiden (PhD Thesis).
- Jacobs, Hubert (1974-1984) Documenta Molucensia, Vol. I-III. Rome: Jesuit Historical Institute.
- Truhart, Peter (2003) Regents of nations. Part 3. Asia & Pacific Oceania. München: Saur.
- Valentijn, François (1724) Oud en Nieuw Oost-Indiën, Vol. I. Amsterdam: Onder de Linden, p. 126-377.
