= Cico of Ternate =

Cico

King of Ternate
- Reign: 1257?–1277?
- Predecessor: New creation
- Successor: Poit
- Religion: Ancestral beliefs

According to historical tradition, Cico was the first king (Kolano) of Ternate in Maluku Islands, Indonesia. His regnal years are given as 1257–1277. Being originally chief of Sampalu village by the coast, he was acknowledged as ruler by the other village leaders in Ternate, starting a dynasty that is still in existence. There are however, several versions of the foundation story, some of which say that Mashur-ma-lamo (Jawi: مشهور ملامو), son of the Arab immigrant Jafar Sadik, was the first king.

== Valentijn's account ==
When the Portuguese established their presence in Maluku in the 16th century, they heard a story about the origins of the Malukan kings. The story goes that Bikusigara (who was a seafarer from Bacan), found four mystical snake eggs among the rocks on an island. He brought them back home, and after a few days three boys and a girl were born from them. As the boys grew up, they became kings of Bacan, the Papuan Islands, and Buton-Banggai, while the girl married the king of Loloda. From them, all the kings of Maluku Islands descended.

A more elaborate story is found in the work of François Valentijn, Oud en Nieuw Oost-Indien (1724). In the mid-13th century a number of migrant groups from Halmahera settled in Ternate to escape the covetous rule by the King of Jailolo. The earliest settlement was Tobona at the top of the volcanic mountain which was headed by a chief called Guna. When going out to tap a sugar palm to make tuak he found a golden mortar and pestle which he brought back to the village. The objects evoked so much curiosity from people that Guna decided to give them away. He thus handed the mortar and pestle to Momole Matiti of the Foramadiahi village, halfway down the mountain. As Momole Matiti also soon found himself disturbed by uninvited curious persons, he in turn gave the objects to Cico, the leader of Sampalu village by the coast. Cico was able to handle all the attention he received, and his status among the village leaders grew. Finally he was asked to become the ruler of Ternate with the title Kolano. This happened about 1257.

Valentijn's story, derived from "the wisest among the natives", has several symbolical-mythical components. The mortar and pestle were sacred objects in megalithic cultures of Indonesia and New Guinea and probably symbolized the wealth derived from clove production. Guna's name means "fortune" in Malay language, and he appears as a culture hero whose inherent spiritual qualities made him find the potent mortar and pestle. Finally, Cico's position as a coastal chief taking over the golden objects underscores the importance of the coastal trade in spices, that brought fortune to Ternate.

About Cico's reign as Kolano, Valentijn merely tells that he ruled in a discreet and friendly way. Although he had been invested with kingship over the island, he never made full use of his powers, in order not to alienate the people who had appointed him. From a misreading of the 17th-century writer Rijali, Valentijn claims that he was also known as Kaicili Cuka, Kaicili meaning prince. In fact, this is due to confusion since Kaicili Cuka was a 16th-century prince who fought the Portuguese. Before his demise in 1277, Cico made the Ternatans acknowledge his son Poit as the rightful successor.

The 19th-century chronicle of Ternate written by Naïdah has it that Cico (or Jiko) was the great-grandson of the founder of Ternate kingship, Mashur-ma-lamo (see below). In this version he resides as ruler in Sampalu and shared kingship with his elder brother Mole-matiti of Foramadiahi. In Naïdah's chronicle the sacred object is a golden music instrument rather than a mortar and pestle. Moreover, Cico, far from leading a peaceful reign, wages war on the Besi mountain whose king flees and leaves his people in Ternate. Cico's son is the last pre-Islamic ruler Gapi Baguna.

== Other versions ==
Another complex of legends center on the Arab visitor Jafar Sadik and his sons, and aims to explain the division in four Kings of Maluku (Ternate, Tidore, Bacan and Jailolo). In a remote time, according to one chronicle on 9 June 1245, Jafar Sadik arrived to Ternate and found seven nymphs (bidadari) bathing in a small lake, leaving their wings on the lake shore. Jafar Sadik stole the wings of the youngest nymph, Nurus Safa, who could therefore not return to the heavenly realm. Jafar Sadik took her as wife, and they had three sons called Buka, Darajat and Sahajat, and four daughters. Later on, Nurus Safa found her wings and returned to heaven alone. Jafar Sadik was however helped by an eagle who brought him before the Lord of Heaven and asked for his wife. After passing a test, Jafar Sadik received his wife back and they were formally married by her father, the Lord of Heaven. A fourth son, Mashur-ma-lamo (the Great Known-by-all) was born in heaven, before the couple returned to Earth. Jafar Sadik and Nurus Safa found their three children who had been left behind. In due time, the sons took up residence in various quarters. Buka went to Makian Island on the west side of Halmahera and became the ancestor of the Kings of Bacan. Darajat withdrew to Moti Island, to the north of Makian, and was the progenitor of the Kings of Jailolo. Sahajat or Sahjati went to Tidore, to the south of Ternate, and founded a dynasty there. The fourth and youngest son Mashur-ma-lamo gave rise to the royal line of Ternate. His kopiah (headdress), which he had received from his heavenly grandfather, became the crown of Ternate. In one version, Mashur-ma-lamo was adopted by Mole-ma-titi, chief of Foramadiahi village, who was childless, and groomed as his successor. Mashur-ma-lamo in turn sired eight sons called Komalo, Jamian, Baku, Ngara-ma-lamo, Paji-ma-lamo, Patsaranga-ma-lamo, Sidang Arif-ma-lamo, and Sah Alam. Sah Alam eventually succeeded his father as Kolano.

There are several problems in assessing the historical elements of the legends of Cico or Mashur-ma-lamo. Some of the eight sons of the latter are also found in Valentijn's history of the Ternate dynasty, though in different genealogical positions. Jafar Sadik and some of his sons and grandsons have Muslim names, although the Ternatan elite was only converted to Islam in the second half of the 15th century. Archaeological excavations on Banda, a center of spice trade, have nevertheless revealed that Islam probably had a certain presence there since c. 1200, so that Muslim impulses may have reached the region much earlier than previously assumed. The dates for Cico's reign, 1257–1277, are probably not reliable, and it is not clear how Valentijn calculated them. A fathomable history of Ternate only starts with the first Sultan Zainal Abidin alias Tidore Wonge in the late 15th century, who is known by early sources.

== See also ==
- List of rulers of Maluku
- Pre-Islamic rulers of Ternate
- Sultanate of Ternate
- Sultanate of Tidore
- Sultanate of Jailolo
- Sultanate of Bacan

Cico of Ternate
Preceded by New creation	King of Ternate; 1257?–1277?	Succeeded by Poit
