= Sjah =

Sjah is an Indonesian surname. Notable people with the surname include:

- Mudaffar Sjah (1935–2015), Indonesian politician
- Sjarifuddin Sjah (1933–2019), Indonesian politician
