= Pre-Islamic rulers of Ternate =

Kingdom of Gapi Pre-Islamic Ternate Ma-Kolano Gapi Uli Lima
- 1257–1486
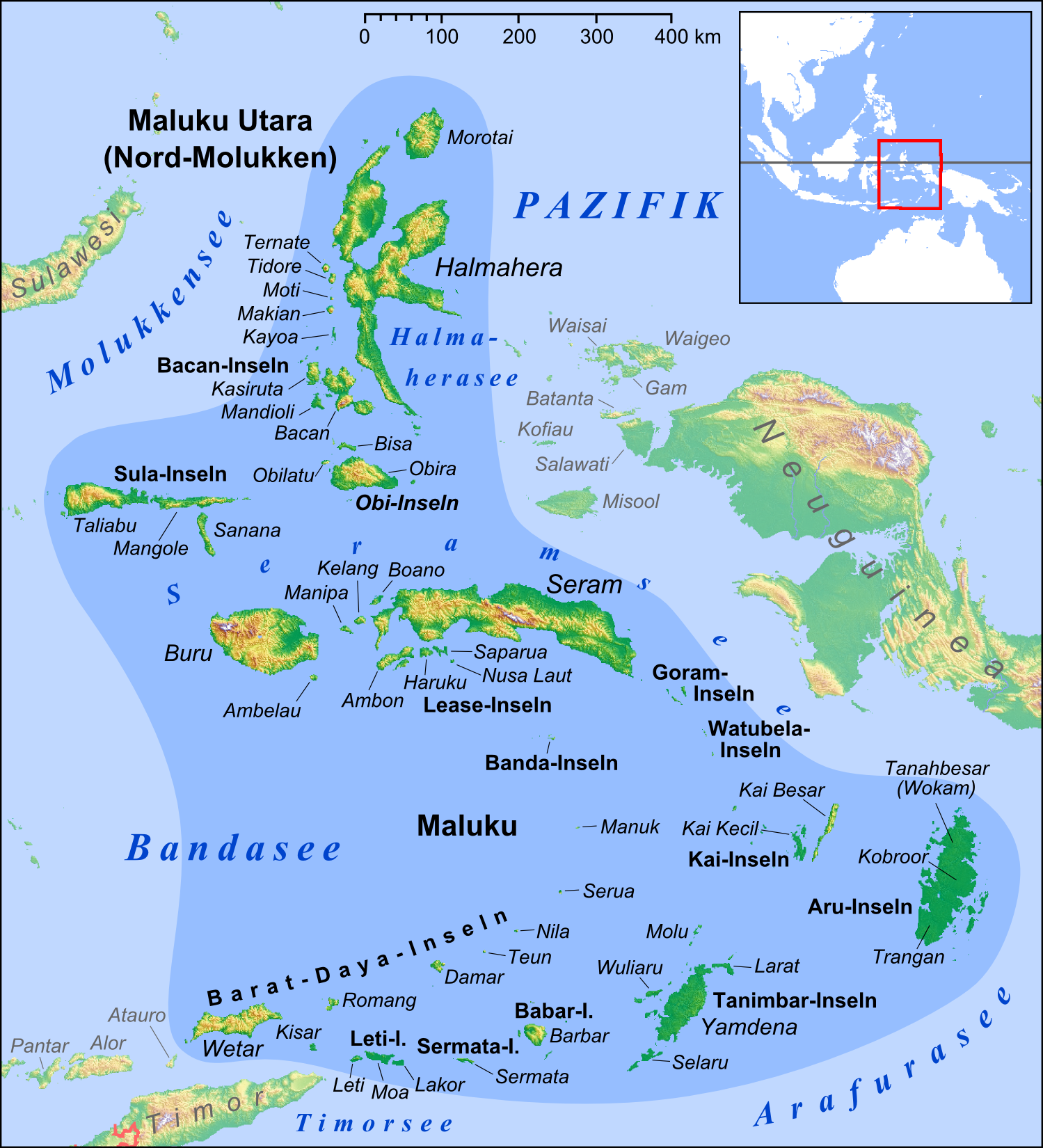
- Capital: Ternate
- Common languages: Ternatean
- Religion: Native animistic Moluccan beliefs, to a lesser extent Hinduism and Buddhism, Islam (15th century)
- Government: Monarchy
- Kolano
  - 1257–1277: Cico
  - 1460s–1486: Marhum
  - 1486: Zainal Abidin
- History
  - Established: 1257
  - Sultanate Established: 1486
| Succeeded by |
| Sultanate of Ternate |

The pre-Islamic rulers of Ternate lorded over the leading spice-producing kingdom in the Maluku Islands in present-day Indonesia. They are known from several partly different historical traditions. One version commences with Cico, a chief of the coastal village Sampalu who obtained a mystical golden mortar and pestle and was elected king (Kolano) by the chiefs of the islands. Other versions start with Mashur-ma-lamo, son of the Arab immigrant Jafar Sadik and a heavenly nymph. Ternate was part of a ritual quadripartition together with the kingdoms of Tidore, Jailolo and Bacan. After many generations, King Tidore Wonge converted to Islam and became Sultan under the name Zainal Abidin (1486?-1500?).

== Sources and background ==
Written sources for the area are scarce up to 1512 when Portuguese colonizers showed up. Maluku ("Wunugu") was known to the Chinese already by 1225, and Indian merchants are known to have traded in spices in Indonesia in the same century. The Nagarakŗtagama (1365) mentions "Maloko" together with Banda, Ambon and Onin as dependencies of Majapahit, though this claim is debated. In 1505 Ludovico di Varthema claims to have visited "Monoch" which probably means Ternate and was the center for clove production. He derides the inhabitants as primitive and does not mention them as being Muslims.

Though Ternate, also known as Gapi, is not explicitly mentioned in pre-1500 sources it was the leading local kingdom in Maluku since the beginnings of documented history, and attracted traders from afar. According to Manuel Lobato, Ternate was "building its own hegemony since a very remote past, a process that certainly started long before the fifteenth century and was about to enter a final stage when it was first described by the Portuguese and Spaniards in the early sixteenth century". Victor Lieberman writes that the foreign demand for spices was initially so modest "that the people of Ternate and Tidore may not have appreciated cloves' commercial value until Chinese traders arrived in the 14th century. The late 1300s and more especially the late 1400s and 1500s saw a major increase in the supply of cloves to Javanese and Malay middlemen, from whom the Chinese began to obtain that spice indirectly. Such middlemen provided rice, ironware, and textiles, which allowed aspirant overlords in North Maluku to centralize patronage and thus to systematize the gathering of cloves from wild trees; as yet cloves were not cultivated." While the elite of the island is known to have embraced Islam in the late 15th century due to contacts with foreign merchants, tradition tells of a long line of pre-Islamic rulers with the title Kolano. They apparently followed local religious practices with a belief in the spirit world. Early European seafarers heard that there had been thirteen kings before the conversion to Islam, however without giving details. As there are no early written sources, the names and details about the Kolanos cannot be ascertained, and the various king lists show some variations. The most important text is François Valentijn’s work Oud en nieuw Oost-Indien (1724). The Protestant priest Valentijn interviewed knowledgeable Ternatans and came up with a short chronicle that starts in the mid-13th century.

== Rulers ==
The history of the pre-Islamic rulers is summarized here as it is presented by Valentijn. The exact dates in Valentijn's text are not confirmed by other sources and it is not clear from where he took them.

=== Cico (1257–1277) ===
According to Valentijn, a number of migrant groups from Halmahera settled in Ternate in the mid-13th century to escape the oppressive rule by the King of Jailolo. The earliest settlement was Tobona at the top of the volcanic mountain which was headed by a chief called Guna. When going out to tap a sugar palm to make tuak he found a golden mortar and pestle which he brought back to the village. The general curiosity that the find evoked made Guna uncomfortable so he decided to give the objects away. He thus handed the mortar and pestle to Momole Matiti, chief of the Foramadiahi village halfway down the mountain. As Momole Matiti also soon found himself disturbed by all the curious persons, he in turn gave the objects to Cico, the leader of Sampalu village by the coast. Cico was able to handle all the attention he received, and his status among the village leaders grew. Finally he was asked to become the ruler of Ternate with the title Kolano. This happened about 1257. Cico ruled for about 20 years in a discreet and friendly way. Although he had been invested with kingship over the island, he never made full use of his powers, in order not to alienate the people who had appointed him. From a misreading of the 17th-century writer Rijali, Valentijn claims that he was also known as Kaicili Cuka, Kaicili meaning prince. In fact, Kaicili Cuka was a 16th-century prince who fought the Portuguese.

=== Poit (1277–1284) ===
Before his demise in 1277 Cico made the Ternatans acknowledge his son Poit as the rightful successor. Poit was 24 years old when he became Kolano and ventured to rule his subjects in a stricter way than his father had done. Subjects who tried to withdraw from his rule were swiftly subjugated, after which he was able to reign in peace until his demise in early 1284. In other sources the second ruler is known as Jamin.

=== Siale (1284–1298) ===
Poit had two sons called Gam-ma-Tihata and Siale who contested the throne. Siale killed his brother and obtained the Kolano-ship in late 1284. The King of Jailolo caused much trouble by repeatedly raiding Ternate from his base in Halmahera. Around 1290 the neighbouring islands Tidore, Moti and Bacan also started conducting raids. As he lay sick, Siale dispatched some of his sons to keep watch against the marauders. On one night the sons successfully captured a number of Tidorese vessels with light losses on their own side. After this feat, Siale’s might grew and the number of villages and settlers increased. Siale therefore moved his residence downhill to Foramadiahi, so that he could confront foreign raiders the more easy. In old age he suffered a stroke and died after three months, leaving nine sons. An alternative list has Komalo as the third ruler of Ternate.

=== Kalabata (1298–1304) ===
His eldest son Kalabata followed him in 1298. In contrast with his father he was a weak and voluptuous figure. His brothers nevertheless supported him well in defeating outer enemies as well as rebellious subjects. In the face of these feats Kalabata began to fear his siblings and poisoned the three most outstanding. The others realized that their own lives were in danger and fled to a village on Tidore that was headed by chief Malonga who gave them protection. Two brothers died in Tidore, but the other four returned to Ternate at Kalabata’s death in 1304. A 19th-century list has the name Bakuku as the fourth ruler.

=== Komalo (1304–1317) ===
Kalabata left three sons of whom Komalo was enthroned in 1304. His mother was a Malay woman. While the first four kings had only local power on Ternate island, the influence of the Ternatans in the region now began to expand. Through his contacts, Komalo was able to attract seafarers from the western archipelago, such as Javanese and Malay, so that his reputation grew. The King of Jailolo created trouble again, but Komalo counterattacked and occupied some villages in Halmahera. He also conquered a village on Tidore in person during a night raid. Another village in the neighbourhood was defeated and the male inhabitants left their wives and children in panic. The king returned them on the promise of tribute.

Komalo had a single son of cruel disposition, Abderama. He tried to appoint him as his heir, but a number of grandees rose against him and forced him to submit to their will, in 1309. Komalo, however, was soon able to regain full powers. He nevertheless realized that his brave but harsh son, who had started to gain some following among the Ternatans, could pose a danger to the kingdom. He therefore brought Abderama along on a trip towards the opposite coast in the middle of the night, and then pushed him overboard to drown in the waves. After this he lived another eight years, until his demise in 1317. Alternatively, the name of the fifth ruler is given as Ngara-mo-lamo in a late king-list.

=== Patsaranga-ma-lamo (1317–1322) ===
His brother Patsaranga-ma-lamo, already 50 years of age, now took over the dignity. The grandees of the kingdom made him promise to change the rules of succession, so that a Kolano must be succeeded by a brother or some other relative from a side-branch. He was a mild ruler who was well liked. Few events of importance occurred during his tenure, but he conquered two villages in Makian in 1321. In spite of his previous promise he tried to make his son Komalo Bangsa the heir, but was instead deposed by the Ternatans in 1322.

=== Sidang Arif Malamo (1322–1331) ===
Sidang Arif Malamo, son of a sister of his predecessor, was appointed as ruler. During his reign many Javanese and Arabs began to settle in Ternate for the clove trade or other purposes, and commerce flourished. The neighbouring islands, jealous of Ternate, tried to attract foreigners as well. It was now that Tidore and Bacan appointed Kolanos in order to compete with Ternate. Obi also brought forward a king of its own, though he was not powerful enough to be counted among the four Malukan rulers (Ternate, Tidore, Jailolo and Bacan).

After a while the four kings of Maluku held a meeting on Moti Island where they decided to henceforth live in peace and make a bond. It was decided that Jailolo would be the first in rank, followed by Ternate, Tidore and Bacan. The King of Bacan protested that he actually had a seniority since his forefather Biko Cigara had once found the eggs of a dragon among the rocks close to Bacan, and that the kings were descended from these eggs. His objections were in vain, however. Sidang Arif greatly increased his knowledge about matters of the world through his friendship with foreigners, and therefore received his name – Sidang Arif means wise master. He eventually died in 1331, leaving five sons.

=== Paji-ma-lamo (1331–1332) ===
Paji-ma-lamo was the brother of his predecessor. He was a voluptuous and frisky person who cared little about the affairs of state. His nights were spent with courtesans and opium, and his reputation among the people dwindled accordingly. He was warned several times that a conspiracy against him was in the making but would not listen. After having reigned only one year, he was murdered in bed by a courtesan who had been bribed by his enemies. He left a son and a posthumous daughter.

=== Syah Alam (1332–1343) ===
After Paji-ma-lamo’s hasty end, his cousin Syah Alam was enthroned in 1332. He was a son of Patsaranga-ma-lamo. After two years a conflict arose with the inhabitants of Makian who killed two Ternatan seafarers and thus provoked a Ternatan invasion. Makian was subjugated by Syah Alam who kept it henceforth. He died after an honourable reign in 1343, leaving three sons and four daughters.

=== Tolu-ma-lamo (1343–1347) ===
The brother of Syah Alam, Tolu-ma-lamo, became Kolano in 1343, but turned out to be a troublesome figure. He was the first to break the bond between the Malukan kings. In response the King Nuruddin of Tidore and Sidang Hasan of Bacan attacked him and conquered Makian that fell under the rule of Tidore. Sidang Hasan had to be content with the goods found in captured Ternatan ships. The King of Jailolo then stepped in between the fighting parties. However, already in the year 1346 Tolu-ma-lamo was able to strike back and recover all of Makian. Nuruddin of Tidore was injured in the struggle and succumbed from his wound. The Ternatan ruler followed up his victory by capturing some coast villages in Bacan. Sidang Hasan hastily fled to the mountains, until Tolu-ma-lamo found himself forced to return to Ternate. After these feats he fell into opium abuse due to his contacts with Javanese and Malay people and died in 1347, leaving two daughters and a son.

=== Boheyat I (1347–1350) ===
The oldest son of Sidang Arif, Boheyat I, succeeded him. He had a good character and ruled in a mild way, but became blind in the second year of his reign. He already died from sickness in 1350, leaving a son by a Javanese woman.

=== Ngolo-ma-Caya (1350–1357) ===
His brother Ngolo-ma-Caya now took over the throne. This ruler was known as a brave warrior and was able to learn some Arabic. He stood in close contact with an Arab immigrant and this enhanced his reputation as a holy man who bonded spirits and angels. These beings bathed with him in a stream of water called Ake-Sibu from which the town of Gammalamo subsequently fetched its water. His Arab trustee also taught him to build better ships than had previously been constructed in Ternate. With these he sailed to the Sula Islands and subjugated them. Some Ternatans were posted on each of the three main islands, and his son Hamed was placed as governor at Taliabu. After seven years the king died in 1357.

=== Momole (1357–1359) ===
Momole was the elder brother of Ngolo-ma-Caya, being the second son of Sidang Arif. He was raised by the grandees of the kingdom but was sickly and died after two years, in 1359. According to some, he was poisoned by a Makassarese concubine.

=== Gapi-ma-lamo (1359–1372) ===
The fourth son of Sidang Arif was now made king. This was Gapi-ma-lamo, a warlike figure who fought for a long time against Jailolo and Tidore. At first he was at good terms with Bacan but eventually fell out with this kingdom as well. In spite of all these conflicts his status among the other kings was high, and he was able to keep the enemies at bay, though he did not conquer any new territory. In all this he was supported by Makassarese and Javanese people. After thirteen years he died in the year 1372.

=== Gapi Baguna I (1372–1377) ===
Gapi Baguna I was the youngest brother of the four preceding rulers. In contrast with Ngolo-ma-Caya and Gapi-ma-lamo he was not a warlike ruler, but made peace with the other Malukan kingdoms. This was sealed by matrimonial relations. His unnamed son married the daughter of the King of Jailolo. When the old ruler died without male heirs, Gapi Baguna's son succeeded to the Jailolo throne. Moreover, Gapi Baguna's two daughters were married in Tidore; the elder with the ruler Hasan Syah, and the younger to the latter's brother and heir Rampala.

=== Komalo Pulu (1377–1432) ===
Another branch of the dynasty took over in 1377, with Tolu-ma-lamo's son Komalo Pulu. From this time the succession tended to be in the straight line. Komalo Pulu was capable and judicious and was feared by the other kingdoms in the region. In 1380 he was close to subjugating Bacan, but Tidore stepped in between the warring parties. Peace was then concluded by a marriage alliance, since the King of Bacan married the second daughter of the Ternate ruler. Komalo Pulu moreover conquered some villages in Halmahera from the King of Jailolo and forced the latter to cede his position of precedence to him. The King of Tidore was not happy about this, but Komalo Pulu was cunningly able to appease him. He died after a very long reign in 1432.

=== Gapi Baguna II (1432–1465) ===
Gapi Baguna II was the son of Komalo Pulu. In contravention to earlier practice, Komalo Pulu had managed to make the grandees accept his son as the right heir. Gapi Baguna was a simple-minded personality, though he could keep the peace with the other kingdoms, except Obi. The ruler of that island married a son of Gapi Baguna but sent her back after just two months. A conflict arose, but the King of Bacan stepped in as peacemaker, and the princess was once again received in Obi. Gapi Baguna died in 1465. According to another chronicle, Hikayat Ternate, Gapi Baguna died at sea and was posthumously known as Ngolo-ma-Caya.

=== Marhum (1465–1486) ===
Marhum, a posthumous name that merely means “the deceased” was the son of Gapi Baguna II and ruled from 1465 to 1486. During his reign Islam began to be accepted by members of the elite. The king himself was nominally converted, but the first truly Muslim ruler was his son and successor Zainal Abidin (1486-1500) who undertook a journey to Java and received instruction in the new religion. During the next reign, of Sultan Bayan Sirrullah (1500-1521), European seafarers showed up and began to interfere in local politics. Several Ternatan king-lists leave out Marhum and say that Zainal Abidin was the son and successor of Gapi Baguna II.

== Other traditions ==
Valentijns account is the most detailed, but there are other king-lists, some of which start with the tale of Jafar Sadik, an Arab who came to Maluku and sired four sons with a heavenly nymph. The sons were Buka of Bacan, Darajat of Jailolo, Sahjati of Tidore, and Mashur-ma-lamo of Ternate, and from them stemmed the traditional quadripartition of Maluku in the original sense of North Maluku. Mashur-ma-lamo was actually born in heaven and his status was further enhanced by his possession of a kopiah (headdress) which he had received from his maternal grandfather, the Lord of Heaven. Another account, which is found in a version of Hikayat Tanah Hitu (c. 1700) says that Komalo was the first ruler of Ternate and provides a sequence that is somewhat shorter than Valentijn's:

- Komalo
- Patisarang-ma-lamo
- Sidang Arif-ma-lamo
- Paji-ma-lamo
- Syah Alam
- Tolu-ma-lamo
- Boheyat I
- Ngolo-ma-Caya
- Mamole
- Gapi-ma-lamo
- Gapi Baguna I
- Komalo Pulu
- Gapi Baguna II
- Zainal Abidin
- Bayan Sirrullah

Further versions are provided by Hikayat Ternate (Story of Ternate, c. 1821), the 19th-century chronicler Naïdah, and the ethnographer Adolf Bastian (1894). They provide mostly the same names and order but with several variations. Some details in the lists are historically problematic; names such as Boheyat (Abu Hayat) and Sidang Arif are Muslim and rather unlikely to have been in use before the second half of the 15th century when the Malukan kingdoms were islamized. On the other hand, archaeological excavations on Banda, a center of spice trade, have revealed that Islam probably had a certain presence there since c. 1200, so that Muslim impulses may in fact have reached the region much earlier than previously assumed. The exact dates provided by Valentijn are also untrustworthy since no written chronicles were produced until far into the Islamic era. The earliest ruler mentioned by near-contemporary sources is Tidore Wonge alias Zainal Abidin (late 15th century).

== See also ==
- Sultanate of Ternate
- Sultanate of Tidore
- Sultanate of Jailolo
- Sultanate of Bacan
- List of rulers of Maluku
