= Marhum of Ternate =

Marhum

King of Ternate
- Reign: 1465?–1486?
- Predecessor: Gapi Baguna II
- Successor: Zainal Abidin
- Father: Gapi Baguna II
- Religion: Islam

Marhum (Jawi: مرحوم), was, according to late tradition, the eighteenth King or Kolano of Ternate in the Maluku Islands. He supposedly ruled between 1465 and 1486, being the first king to adopt Islam. His name merely means "The Late", "The Deceased", and he is probably the same person as King Gapi Baguna II (Jawi: ݢاڤي بݢون ٢), mentioned in several other chronicles and king lists. His son, Zainal Abidin, became the first Sultan of Ternate.

== François Valentijn's account ==
The only authors to give substantial information about Marhum are Europeans, namely the German botanist Georg Rumphius (1678), and the Dutch cleric François Valentijn in his comprehensive work Oud en Nieuw Oost-Indien (1724–1726). Rumphius and Valentijn drew from now lost manuscripts and traditions from North Maluku. According to Rumphius's account, Marhum was the first ruler of Ternate and was of either Javanese or Butonese descent. On the contrary, Valentijn says that he was the son and successor of the seventeenth King Gapi Baguna II (r. 1432–1465). His island kingdom was one of the four realms that traditionally existed in North Maluku, the others being Tidore, Bacan and Jailolo. Jailolo, which was based on Halmahera, was as yet the most powerful of the four, and waged war against Marhum during his time. The reign of Marhum saw significant economic changes in the region. Malay, Javanese and Chinese traders arrived in increasing numbers to the islands in eastern Indonesia to purchase spices. The Banda Islands in southern Maluku became an important trading entrepot, and a few Ternatan ships went there with cargoes of cloves which grew abundantly on their island. This attracted the foreign merchants to proceed from Banda to Ternate to take in spices. At this time the clove trees were not purposefully planted, and the locals obtained the stalks by cutting down the branches rather than climbing the trees to pick the stalks, as was later the case.

Among the visiting merchants was a Javanese Muslim called Hussein, or Dato Maulana Hussein, who was also a preacher. The Ternatans were as yet unacquainted with reading and writing, and were stunned when Hussein and his boys were able to read out words from the letters of the Qur'an. Hussein told the bystanders that these were holy letters that no-one may read without knowing God and his Prophet. In that way the first tenets of Islam entered North Malukan society. Marhum was also converted, though his knowledge of the creed was rather rudimentary. According to Rumphius as well as Valentijn, he was a simple figure and far from a strong ruler. It was his son and successor Zainal Abidin who began to introduce certain Islamic institutions, at least among the elite of the kingdom, and to expand the political network of Ternate.

== Identity ==
Several texts, such as Rijali's Hikayat Tanah Hitu (written before 1657 and later adjusted in c. 1700), Hikayat Ternate, and Naïdah's chronicle, state that Gapi Baguna II was the actual father of Sultan Zainal Abidin, although Valentijn makes him the father of Marhum. This Gapi Baguna is sometimes said to have followed his son Zainal Abidin on a journey to Java to learn more about Islam, but to have died on the return journey. It has therefore been assumed that one historical figure has been split into two. Whatever the case, European accounts from the 16th century say that Islam had been introduced in North Maluku in about the 1460s or 1470s, which provides some support for the conversion stories.

== See also ==
- List of rulers of Maluku
- Pre-Islamic rulers of Ternate
- Spice trade

Marhum of Ternate
Preceded by Gapi Baguna II	King of Ternate; 1465?–1486?	Succeeded by Zainal Abidin
