= Foramadiahi =

Foramadiahi is a village on Ternate island in North Maluku, Indonesia. It has a prominent role in stories about the formation of the Ternate Kingdom and has a number of historical graves.

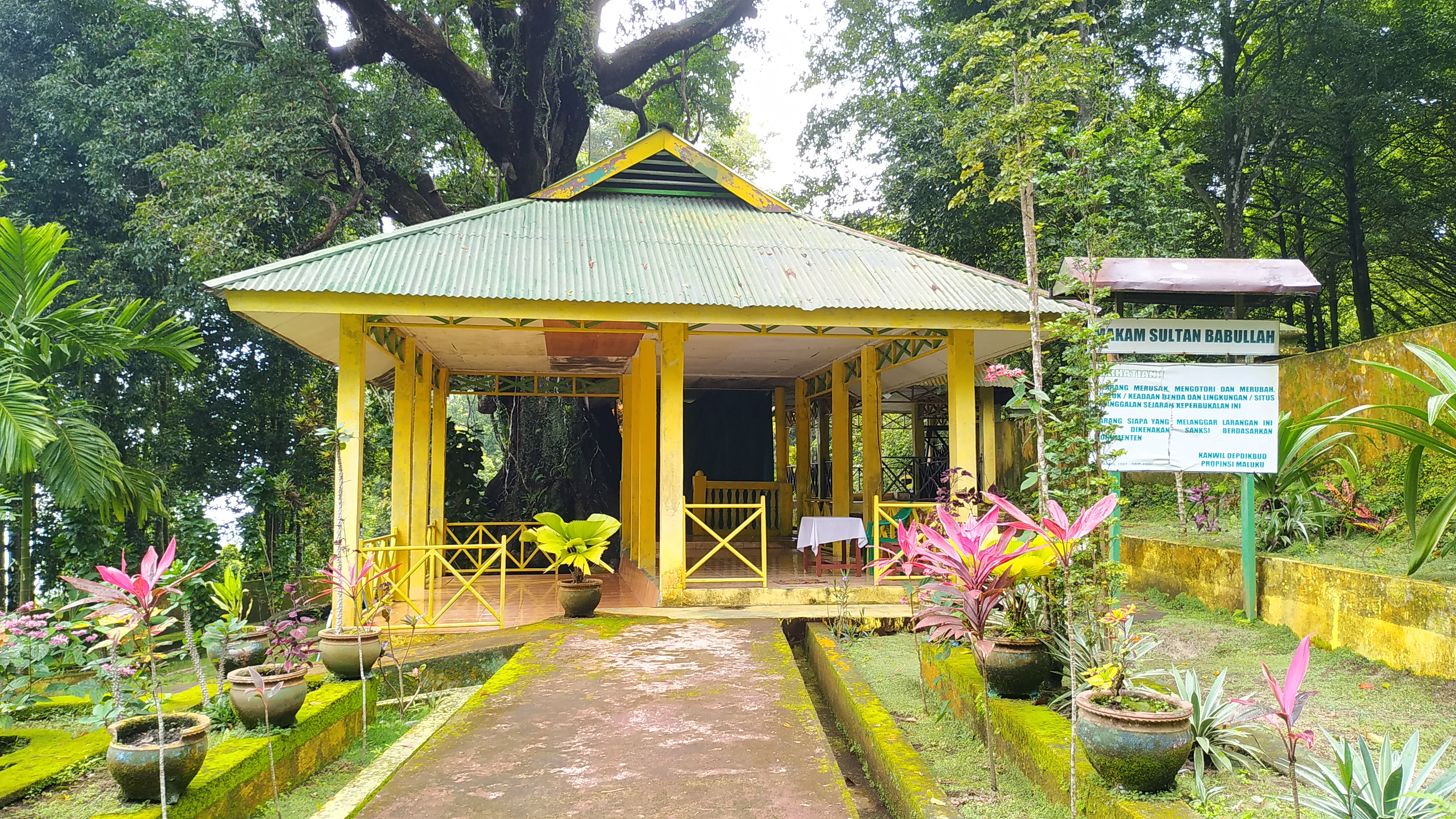
The grave of Sultan Babullah in Foramadiahi

Foramadiahi is situated in the southern part of Ternate, 350 meters above sea level, overlooking the old sultan's seat Gam-ma-lamo. According to the historical traditions of Ternate, the oldest center on the island was Tobona further uphill. In the mid-13th century, the Ternatans under a chief called Molé-ma-titi established a second settlement midway between mountain and sea. This was Foramadiahi which offered a good vantage point over the southern coastal section and the islands nearby. Later still, a third settlement was founded at the coast, namely Sampalu (close to the site of Gam-ma-lamo). The third king (kolano) of Ternate, Siale (traditionally dated 1284-1298) abandoned his old capital Tobona for Foramadiahi. Later on the seat of the kolanos (from the late 15th century sultans) was moved to the coast, apparently as a consequence of the increasing inter-regional spice trade. In colonial times Foramadiahi was settled by people from Tidore. However, the site was completely abandoned by the 1970s. It has presently a small population and the status of a keluruhan. Among the graves preserved at the site is one where Sultan Babullah of Ternate was supposedly buried.

== See also ==
- Pre-Islamic rulers of Ternate
- Cico of Ternate
