= Muhammad Usman of Ternate =

Sultan Muhammad Usman Syah
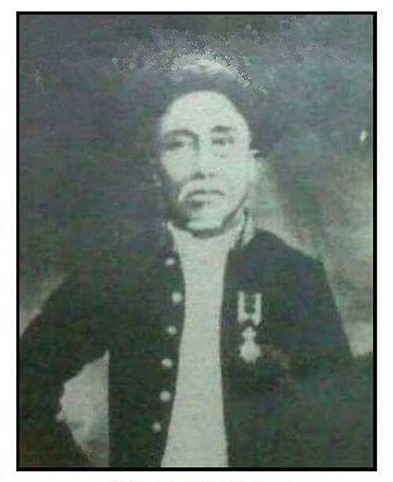

Sultan of Ternate
- Reign: 1902–23 September 1915
- Predecessor: Ilham
- Successor: Muhammad Jabir
- Died: January 1941
- Father: Ayanhar
- Mother: Dano Cina
- Religion: Islam

Sultan Muhammad Usman Syah (Jawi: سلطان محمد عثمان شاه; d. 1941) was the 46th ruler of Ternate from 1902 to 1915. He was hostile to the interference in local affairs by the Dutch Colonial State, and was eventually arrested and exiled.

== Colonial encroachment ==
Muhammad Usman, also spelt Mohammad Oesman, was the fourth son of Sultan Amiruddin Iskandar alias Ayanhar, who died in 1900. After a very short reign by his elder brother Ilham, Muhammad Usman succeeded to the throne in February 1902. His full title was Sultan Tajul-Mahsil Binayatullah al-Hannan Siraj ul-Mulk Amiruddin Iskandar Munawar as-Saddik Wahuwa min al-'Adilin Syah. His reign coincided with increasing Dutch interference in the Indonesian vassal kingdoms, where several rulers in Bali, Sulawesi, Sumatra, and West Timor were defeated through military intervention and sometimes deposed. In 1903 the Colonial State appointed officials with the task to supervise the actions of the Sultan's government. The colonial government soon increased its control further by taking over the right of taxation in the dependencies of Ternate.

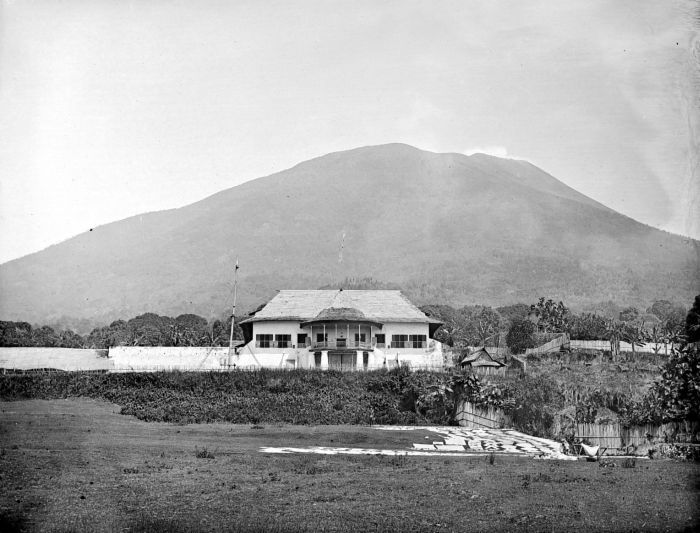
The kadaton (palace) of the Sultan of Ternate, early 20th century.

== Crisis and exile ==
As part of the modernization attempts, the authorities introduced equality in tax obligations between Muslims and non-Muslims. This led to a minor uprising in Jailolo in September 1914, whereby the controleur G.K.B. Agerbeek and Lieutenant C.F. Ouwerling were murdered. The rising was quickly suppressed by colonial troops. However, as the Dutch found that the uncooperative Muhammad Usman took "an utterly reprehensible position", they took the opportunity to arrest him in December 1914 and eventually the Dutch East Indies government decided to strip him off his throne on 23 September 1915 by a decree. The Sultan had consistently opposed the increasing colonial interference, including the introduction of basic native schools. He was brought over to Bacan Islands, and from there to Bandung in Java. This spelt the temporary end of the sultanate. Ternate Island was divided in three districts and the old governance via the bobatos (chiefs) of the various soa (settlements) was abrogated. The old scattered settlement pattern on the island was forcibly changed and people were pushed to settle in kampungs along the major roads. Local governance was however still handled by the gogugu (chief minister), hukum (magistrate) and secretary. Muhammad Usman's young heir Muhammad Jabir was educated in European fashion and eventually enthroned in 1929.

== Demise and family ==
Muhammad Usman stayed in Java until about 1932, when he was allowed to return. He died in January 1941. He married Boki Mihir from Halmahera. His children included:

- Muhammad
- Muhammad Jabir of Ternate
- Ikhtirajur Rahman
- Muhammad Natsir
- Boki Umi
- Boki Lompo

== See also ==
- Sultanate of Ternate
- List of rulers of Maluku

Muhammad Usman of Ternate
Preceded by Ilham	Sultan of Ternate; 1902–1914	Succeeded by Muhammad Jabir
