= Zainal Abidin of Ternate =

Zainal Abidin

Sultan of Ternate
- Reign: 1486–1500
- Successor: Bayan Sirrullah
- Issue: 5, including Bayan Sirrullah
- Father: Marhum of Ternate
- Religion: Sunni Islam

Zainal Abidin (Jawi: زين العابدين); born Tidore Wonge (تدوري وڠي) or Gapi Buta (ݢاڤي بوت)) was the 18th or 19th ruler of the Ternate Sultanate of Maluku, located in modern-day Indonesia. His life is only described in sources dating from the 16th century or later. According to these sources he was the first ruler of Ternate to use the title Sultan rather than Kolano, or king, and enacted a number of changes in the government, based on Islamic Law, technically transforming Ternate into an Islamic kingdom.

== Tidore Wonge and the Muslim Javanese princess ==
By far the oldest account is provided in a Portuguese text from c. 1544, A treatise on the Moluccas. It says that Islam came to Maluku about 80–90 years previously, brought by Malay, Javanese and other merchants. Along with them arrived a Muslim Javanese woman of high birth who subsequently married the King of Ternate, Tidore Wonge. The king was then converted for her sake. A variant version provided by the same text says that Tidore Wonge, who had recently accepted Islam, travelled to Melaka and Java to learn about foreign lands and to be confirmed in his fate. On his return journey he married the Javanese princess whose influence paved the way for the new religion. After his death, Tidore Wongi was succeeded by his son Abu Lais (Bayan Sirrullah).

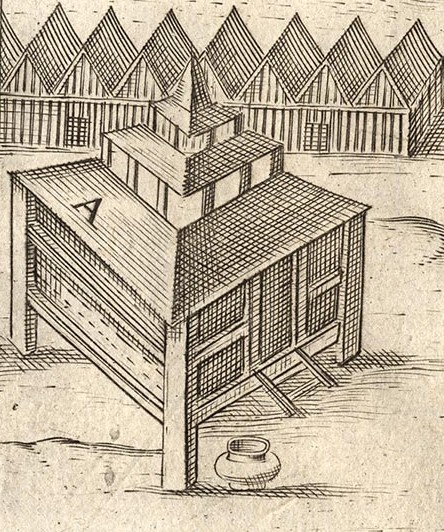
The royal mosque of Gammalamo in Ternate as it appeared in the late 16th century.

The Malay Annals, which narrate the history of the Melaka Sultanate, also tell of a Raja of Maluku who made a westward journey. He arrived to Melaka in the reign of Sultan Alauddin Riayat Syah (r. 1477-1488) and did homage to him. In return he was given robes of honour and other fitting gifts. Raja Maluku was an expert on Malay football (sepak raga) and readily played with the young nobles of the kingdom. He was also a man of great strength, as he could cut through a mature coconut palm with a single stroke of his sword. He was among the favourites of Sultan Alauddin and returned to his country after a successful visit. It seems likely that Raja Maluku means the ruler of Ternate.

== The versions of Valentijn and Hikayat Tanah Hitu ==
According to the more elaborated version by François Valentijn (1724) the future Sultan was the son of Kolano Marhum, the eighteenth king of Ternate. Other chronicles say that his father was the seventeenth ruler Gapi Baguna II (Ngolo-ma-Caya) while his mother was a lady from the Sula Islands. Valentijn indicates that Marhum was the first recorded convert to Islam, and as such provided the young prince with an Islamic education. Under Marhum's rule, the first tenets of Islam were preached by a merchant-cum-cleric from Java named Dato Maulana Hussein who stunned the as-yet illiterate Ternatans with his reading skills. Some traditions, including the oldest chronicle Hikayat Tanah Hitu by Rijali (written before 1657 and later revised), nevertheless hold that Zainal Abidin himself first converted to the new religion. The Hikayat relates that a prince and missionary from Samudra Pasai in Sumatra, Mahadum by name, travelled to Maluku via Melaka and Java, successfully converting the rulers of Jailolo, Tidore and Ternate in turn. Mahadum stayed in Ternate and died there, his son marrying Zainal Abidin's daughter. Valentijn gives Zainal Abidin's regnal years as 1486-1500, though it is unclear what this is based on. Another European author, Georg Rumphius (1678) says that the sultan passed away around 1510.

== Islamization of Ternate ==
Ternate was one of the four traditional kingdoms in North Maluku, the others being Tidore, Bacan and Jailolo. Of these, Ternate emerged as the stronger component at an early date, though it was severely contested by the others. As soon as he was appointed ruler, according to Valentijn, Zainal Abidin had to deal with aggression from the powerful Jailolo kingdom that was based in Halmahera and allied with Tidore. Eventually the warring parts made peace in 1488, leaving the ruler free to bring Ternate on the track to ordered Islamic governance. Many Muslim Javanese traders frequented Ternate at the time and incited the king to learn more about the new creed. In c. 1495, he traveled with his companion Hussein to study Islam in Giri (Gresik) on Java's north coast, where Sunan Giri kept a well-known madrasa. While there, he won renown as Sultan Bualawa, or Sultan of Cloves. He was well respected, known as a valiant warrior and pious scholar, and developed friendships which developed into strong alliances. One story told of his time there is that he stood up to a crazed killer on the rampage while others fled, beheading him with a single stroke.

According to the Hikayat Tanah Hitu, Zainal Abidin stopped in Bima in Sumbawa on his way back to Maluku. He and his crew got into trouble with the local king and a fight took place where a Bimanese wounded Zainal Abidin with his spear. The bodyguards of the ruler brought him back to the ship, though he died on board. The account of François Valentijn, on the contrary, insists that he survived the battle and made it back to Ternate. On his return, he replaced the royal title Kolano with Sultan, and it may have been now that he adopted the Islamic name Zainal Abidin. He brought back a mubaligh from Java named Tuhubahahul (Baharullah) to propagate the Islamic faith and created a Bobato (headman) to assist in all matters relating to the rule of Islamic law across the Sultanate. The background to this transformation is the inter-regional network that developed during the 15th century with the lucrative trade in cloves and exotic forest products. This trade attracted Indian, Javanese and Malay traders who were often Muslim. European accounts date the introduction of Islam to about the 1460s or 1470s. Far into the 16th century, however, European observers noted that Islam was mostly confined to the highest elite. The great dissemination of Islam in Maluku came later, after 1570.

== Expansion of political influence ==
Zainal Abidin's reign coincided with the rise of the noble houses of Tomaitu and Tomagola who were instrumental in spreading the political influence of Ternate. Members of the Tomaitu went to the Sula Islands where they acted as sub-rulers with the title Kimelaha. The Tomagola, on their part, settled in Buru Island and later established their authority in the Ambon Quarter, settling at the inner coast of Ceram. These migrations had a long lasting impact. The friendship pact that the Sultan concluded with Pati Puti (or Pati Tuban), one of the petty rulers from Ambon, also contributed to the claims made by Ternate to the southern parts of Maluku: Buru, Seram, Ambon, the Lease and Banda Islands. A 19th-century chronicle claims that Zainal Abidin, at the time when he returned from Java, subdued half of Sulawesi. These areas are, however only documented as Ternatan vassals in the second half of the 16th century.

== Family ==
Zainal Abidin had two known consorts, a Javanese aristocrat and a lady from soa Marsaoli, and several children, including:

- Kaicil Leliatu, d. 1521
- Kuliba, d. after 1512
- Vaidua, d. after 1545
- Boki Jamanula who married Syaku, son of the preacher Mahadum
- Darwis (Taruwes), d. 1530, is sometimes listed as a son, but was more probably the son of Kaicil Leliatu

Kaicil Leliatu succeeded his father as the second Sultan, with the title Bayan Sirrullah. The traditional date for his accession is 1500.

== See also ==
- Spice trade
- List of rulers of Maluku
- Pre-Islamic rulers of Ternate
- Sultanate of Ternate
- History of Islam in Indonesia

Zainal Abidin of Ternate
Preceded by New Creation	Sultan of Ternate; 1485–1500	Succeeded by Bayan Sirrullah
