= Muhammad Jabir of Ternate =

Sultan Muhammad Jabir Syah
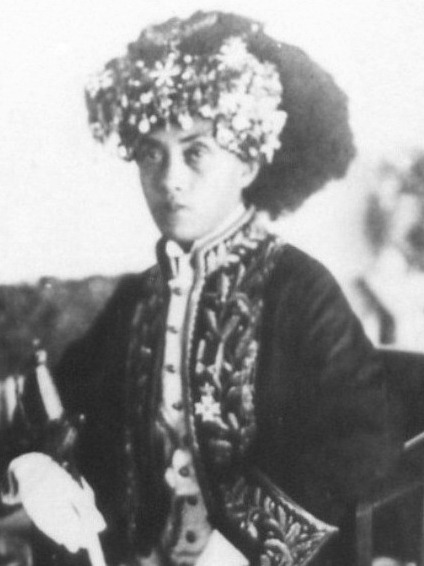

Sultan of Ternate
- Reign: 1929–1975
- Predecessor: Muhammad Usman
- Successor: Mudaffar Sjah
- Born: 4 March 1902; Ternate, Maluku
- Died: 4 July 1975 (aged 73)
- Father: Muhammad Usman
- Mother: Boki Mihir
- Religion: Islam

Sultan Muhammad Jabir Syah (4 March 1902 – 4 July 1975), also spelt Mohammad Djabir Sjah, was the 47th ruler of Ternate from 1929 to 1975. He was the last Ternatean Sultan with executive powers, since the old institutions of the sultanate were replaced with new bureaucratic structures after the winning of Indonesian Independence.

== Youth and enthronement ==
Iskandar Muhammad Jabir was born on Ternate in 1902 as the son of Sultan Muhammad Usman and Boki Mihir. His father was hostile to interference by the Dutch colonial authorities in the internal affairs of the sultanate, and the Dutch therefore arrested him in December 1914 and sent him in exile to Java in the next year. No new Sultan was appointed for many years, and the colonial authorities changed the administration of Ternate in many respects. Muhammad Jabir was educated in a European Junior School in Ternate, and then sent to Junior High School (MULO) in Batavia in 1917. In order to gain practical skills for his future task, he served under the Assistant Resident of Sumbawa for a time. In 1929, finally, he was able to go back to Ternate where he was enthroned in the same year. The previous Dutch reorganization of the local administration was however kept, so that Muhammad Jabir led a semi-traditional rule.

== War and revolution ==
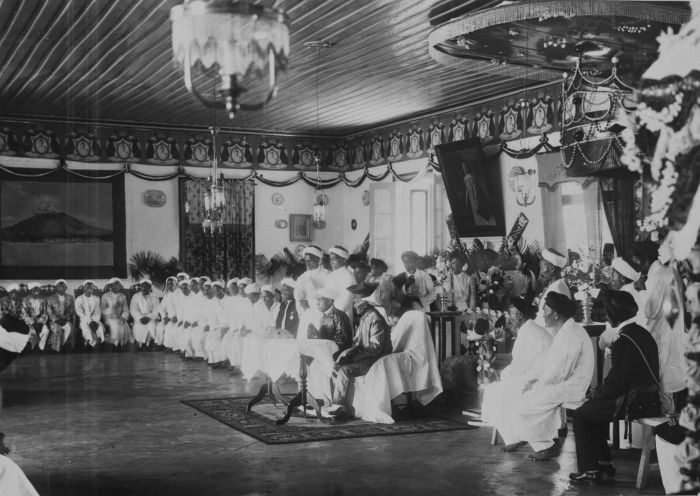
Marriage of Sultan Muhammad Jabir with Boki Maryam in Bacan, 1930.

The Dutch East Indies were attacked by the Japanese in 1941-42 and quickly overrun. As elsewhere, the Japanese rule in Ternate carried with it much hardship. In 1944 the Western Allies began to liberate parts of eastern Indonesia. From their newly conquered base in Morotai they made contact with the Sultan who moved to the nearby island Hiri which was not garrisoned by Japanese troops. An Allied motorboat picked him up and brought him to Morotai, from whence he was flown to Australia. The Sultan returned to Ternate after the Japanese surrender in August 1945, carrying the official rank of Lieutenant-Colonel in the Dutch Colonial Army (KNIL). Local members of the anti-Japanese resistance were incorporated in the KNIL, so that the Sultan personally commanded a detachment. He was also appointed Resident of North Maluku. By now, however, the Indonesian Revolution was underway. Indonesian nationalism was not particularly strong in Maluku, which was incorporated in the Dutch-sponsored quasi-state of East Indonesia. In the ensuing elections to the East Indonesian parliament, Muhammad Jabir supported Partai Persatuan Maluku Utara (PASMU) against the nationalistic Persatuan Indonesia (PI). However, PASMU did not gain representation in the parliament in Makassar. Still, Muhammad Jabir was appointed Minister of Internal Affairs in 1949–50. During these years North Maluku was a union of three swapraja (self-rule) regions, namely Ternate, Tidore and Bacan, whose Sultans handled daily affairs as an executive council. At their side, a People's Representative Council had the authority to participate in lawmaking. From the perspective of the East Indonesian authorities, the area carried on its administrative duties well.

== After independence ==
After the gaining of Indonesian independence, East Indonesia was dissolved as a separate entity in 1950. During the preceding period Muhammad Jabir had proved to be a skillful political player. However, the Sultan was now suspected of having supported the attempts to establish a separate Republic of South Maluku, and the Indonesian authorities arrested him and brought him to Makassar for trial. Although he was exonerated, he did not go back to Ternate but rather moved to Jakarta. This was done in order not to create further problems between the new Indonesian government and the Ternatan people. In Jakarta he worked under the Ministry for Internal Affairs until he was pensioned off in 1960. He only returned to Ternate for a brief visit in 1953. In the meanwhile some of the old functionaries of the sultanate were kept for the time being. However, the late 1950s and early 1960s were difficult times for Ternatan society, and there was a wish for a larger degree of autonomy for North Maluku. From his Jakartan base the Sultan worked for a reinvigoration of the old body of traditions (adat) after 1963. His son Mudaffar Sjah had a role in this movement, which however became twisted due to the Sultan's own maneuvering. In 1968 Mudaffar Sjah was told by the government to put a halt to the restoration of the adat. When the old Muhammad Jabir died in Jakarta in 1975, the sultanate seemed to have come to a definitive end. Some cultural aspects were nevertheless restored by Mudaffar Sjah who was enthroned as titular Sultan in 1986.

== Family ==
Sultan Muhammad Jabir Syah had two consorts:

- Hamidah from Soa Siu
- Boki Maryam, daughter of Sultan Muhammad Usman of Bacan

He sired eight children, five sons and three daughters:

- Awaluddin
- Sjarifuddin Sjah, titular Sultan of Ternate
- Mudaffar Sjah, titular Sultan of Ternate
- Abdul Hamid
- Affandi
- Boki Syarinsad
- Boki Rawang
- Boki Fatima

== See also ==
- Sultanate of Ternate
- List of rulers of Maluku

Muhammad Jabir of Ternate
Preceded by Muhammad Usman	Sultan of Ternate; 1929–1975	Succeeded by Mudaffar Sjah
