= Museum Kedaton Sultan Ternate =

Museum in North Maluku, Indonesia

Coordinates: 0°48′1.48″N 127°23′3.28″E

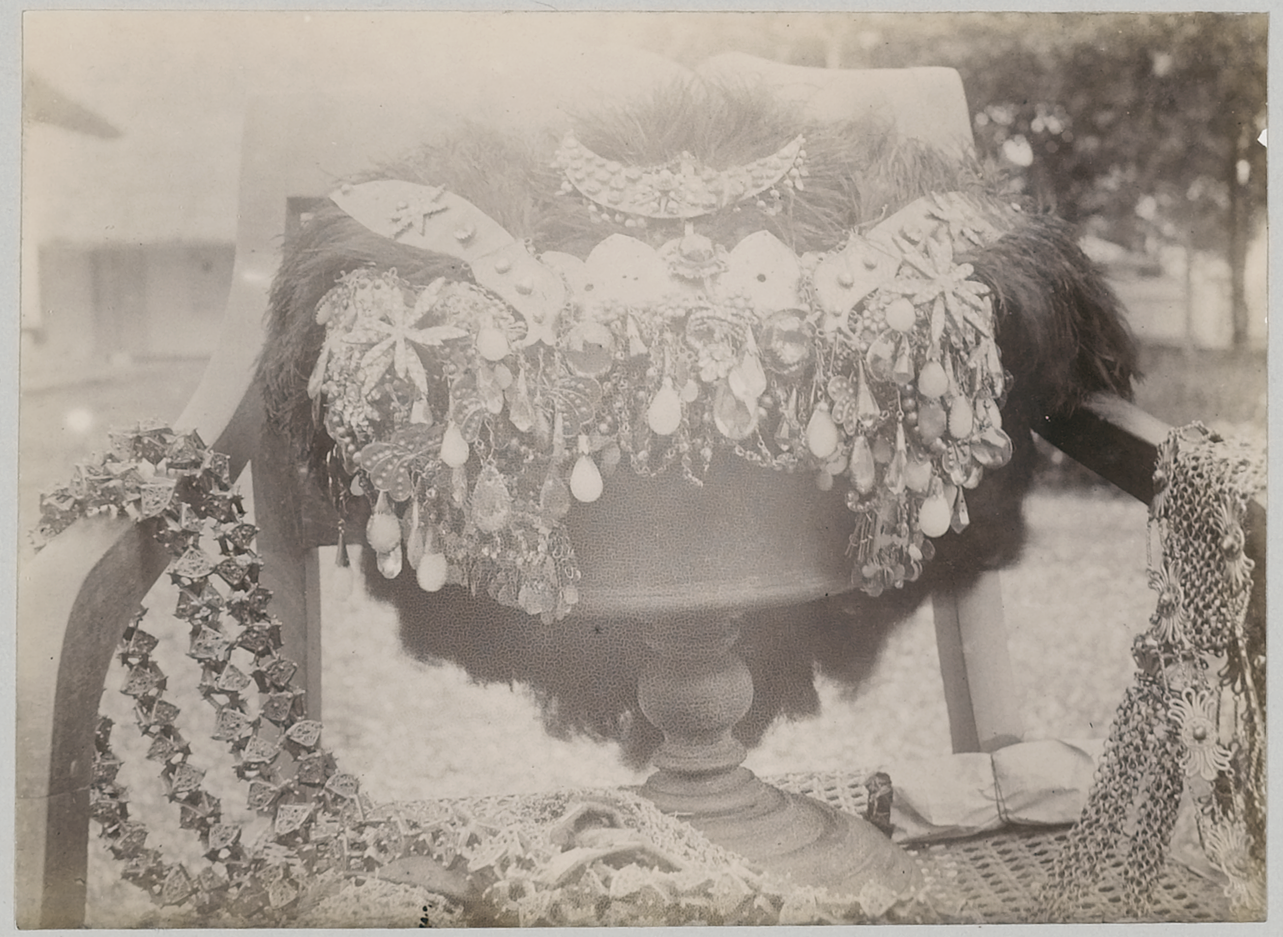
The crown of the Sultanate of Ternate

The Museum Kedaton Sultan Ternate (Palace of the Sultan of Ternate Museum) is a museum in the village of Soa-sio, North Ternate, Ternate, North Maluku, Indonesia. It is a museum of relics from the era of the Sultanate of Ternate, and is based in the palace built in 1813 by Sultan Muhammad Ali, who ruled from 1807 to 1821.

== History ==
Museum Kedaton Sultan of Ternate is a 1500 square meter building situated on 1.5 acres of land, commissioned on 24 November 1813 by Sultan Muhammad Ali. It was built by a Chinese architect as a palace for the Sultan. The palace was handed over to the Indonesian Ministry of Education and Culture in 1981 and was inaugurated as a museum in 1982, though it still functions as a residence for the Sultan. The palace itself, known as a kadaton or keraton has an area of 44,560m². Also in the palace complex are the Grand Mosque (Sigi Lamo), Meeting Room and Court (Ngara Lamo), and the pier or harbour (Dodoku Ali).

== Collections ==
The museum contains a number of items illustrating the geology, history, technology and art of the region. The museum holds the ornate golden throne of the Sultanate of Ternate, alongside a number of precious gemstones and jewellery pieces.

Of particular interest is the crown of the Sultanate, which despite being over 500 years old, contains human hair which continues to grow. A special hair cutting ceremony is held for the crown every year on the festival of Eid-al-Adha.
