= Sjarifuddin Sjah =

Sjarifuddin Syah

Sultan of Ternate
- Reign: 2016–2019
- Predecessor: Mudaffar Sjah II
- Successor: Hidayatullah Sjah
- Born: 1 August 1933; Ternate, Dutch East Indies
- Died: 21 May 2019 (aged 85); Jakarta, Indonesia
- Father: Sultan Muhammad Jabir
- Mother: Hamidah Hafel
- Religion: Islam

Sultan Sjarifuddin Sjah (1 August 1933 – 21 May 2019) was the executive (pelaksana) Sultan of Ternate, North Maluku, being the 49th monarch of the island. He held the ceremonial but prestigious title after the death of his younger brother Mudaffar Syah II, during the years 2016–2019.

== Sultan of Ternate ==
Sjarifuddin was born in Ternate, in what was then the Dutch East Indies in 1933, as the son of Sultan Muhammad Jabir and Hamidah Hafel. He was educated at the Delft Technical University in the Netherlands, becoming a mining engineer. He later worked at PT Aneka Tambang, a state-owned mining company, from which he retired in 1988. The sultan family lost their executive functions in the years after the Independence of Indonesia in 1949, and the sultan title temporarily lapsed after the death of his father in 1975. However, his younger brother Mudaffar Sjah, born from a more high-ranking consort, was generally accepted as the heir; he was formally installed in 1986, though unofficially from Jakarta's point of view. The sultanate gained leverage after the end of Suharto's New Order, with a revival of old traditions. However, after Mudaffar Sjah's death in 2015 a conflict emerged within the sultan's family as to who was the rightful successor. The late sultan had several sons with different wives, complicating the issue. Eventually Mudaffar's brother Sjarifuddin was enthroned on 4 September 2016 by the dignitaries Kimelaha Tamadi and Kimelaha Marsaoly. The ceremony took place in the Kadato Ico palace in Soa Sio, northern Ternate. It was understood to be a pragmatic agreement in order to put an end to the contest between three sons of Mudaffar. Sjarifuddin's role was that of executive sultan (pelaksana sultan) and he did not officiate over some of the ceremonies traditionally associated with Ternatan kingship. His reign was short since he died in Jakarta in 2019. He was succeeded by a son of Mudaffar Sjah, Hidayatullah Sjah who was crowned as the 49th Sultan of Ternate on 18 December 2021.

== See also ==
- Sultanate of Ternate
- List of rulers of Maluku

Sjarifuddin Sjah
Preceded by Mudaffar Sjah II	Sultan of Ternate; 2016–2019	Succeeded by Hidayatullah Mudaffar Sjah
