= Sultanate of Ternate =

Muslim kingdom in Indonesia, 1486–1950

Sultanate of Ternate کسلطانن ترناتي Kesultanan Ternate
- 1486–1950
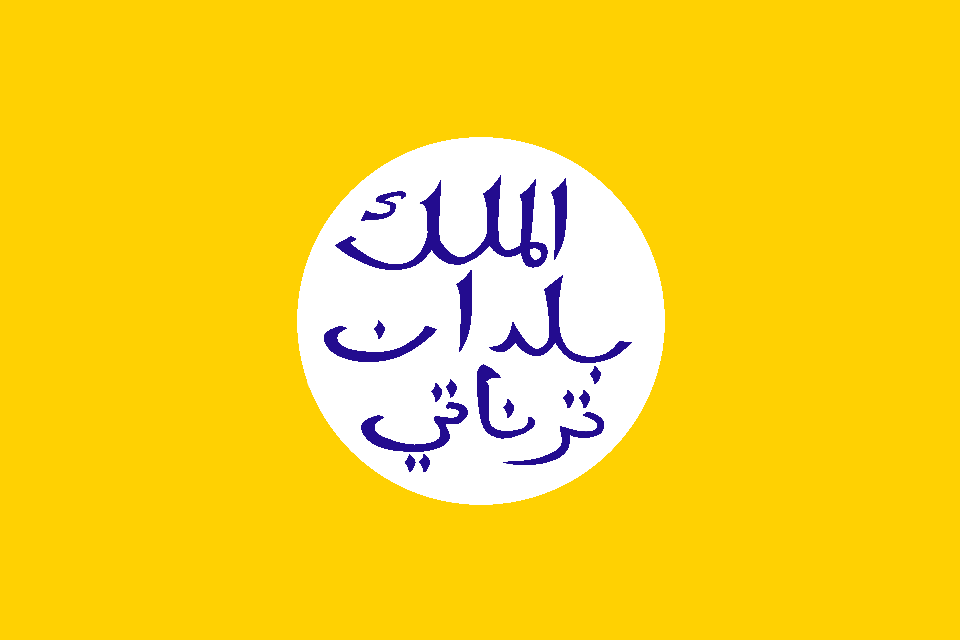
- Flag

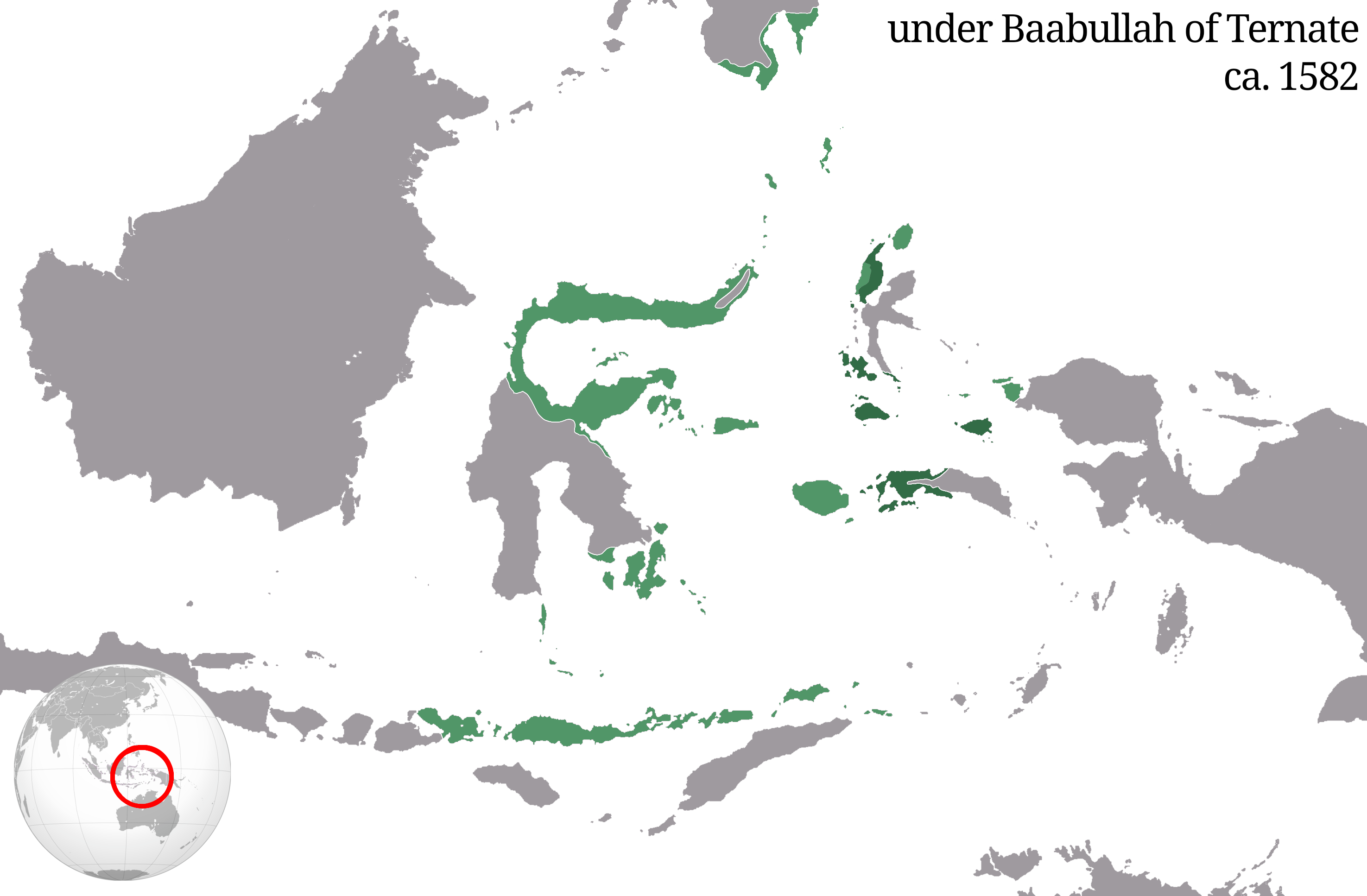
- The Sultanate of Ternate at its greatest extent during the reign of Babullah of Ternate, c. 1582.
- Capital: Ternate Gammalammo (royal capital 1575-1606)
- Common languages: Ternate, Malay, Portuguese (from 16th to 17th century), and Portuguese based creole.
- Religion: Sunni Islam
- Government: Sultanate
- Sultan
  - 1486 – 1500: Zainal Abidin of Ternate (first sultan)
  - 1902 – 1915: Muhammad Usman Shah (last sultan to rule Ternate)
  - 1929 – 1975: Muhammad Jabir Syah (Honorary Sultan)
  - 2015 – 2019: Sjarifuddin Sjah (Pretender)
  - 2021 – present: Hidayatullah Mudaffar Sjah (Pretender)
- History
  - Founded: 1486
  - Vassalisation by Dutch: 1683
  - Final ruler dethroned by Dutch: 1914
  - Honorary sultan crowned: 1925
Preceded by	Succeeded by
Kingdom of Gapi	Dutch East Indies
- Today part of: Indonesia

The Sultanate of Ternate (Jawi: کسلطانن ترناتي), previously known as the Kingdom of Gapi, is one of the oldest Muslim kingdoms in Indonesia besides the sultanates of Tidore, Jailolo, and Bacan. Ternate was a rival of the Sultanate of Tidore for control of the spice trade in the history of eastern Indonesia.

The Ternate kingdom was established by Momole Cico, the first leader of Ternate, with the title Baab Mashur Malamo, traditionally in 1257. It reached its Golden Age during the reign of Sultan Baabullah (1570–1583) and encompassed most of the eastern part of Indonesia and a part of southern Philippines. Ternate was a major producer of cloves and a regional power from the 15th to 17th centuries.

The dynasty founded by Cico continues to the present, as does the Sultanate itself, although it no longer holds any political power.

== History ==
=== Pre-colonial period ===
The sultanate was originally named the Kingdom of Gapi, but was later renamed for its capital, Ternate. Originally there were four villages in Ternate, led by clan leaders called Momole. The villages mainly traded spices with Arab, Malay, and Chinese traders. These lucrative trades attracted pirates and because of this, a kingdom emerged. According to one version, Momole Guna of Tobona suggested a forum in which a stronger organization of kingdom would be adopted. Momole Cico was elected to be the first Gapi king with regnal name Baab Mashur Malamo. According to another version, the ancestor of the Malukan kings was an Arab descendant of the Prophet called Jafar Sadik. Coming to Ternate, he encountered a nymph (bidadari) from heaven (kayangan) called Nurus Safa. Their four sons were the dynastic ancestors of Bacan, Jailolo, Tidore, and Ternate. The idea of a genealogical unity of the four realms of Maluku has had a large cultural significance that persists until the present. According to Ternatan legend, the youngest of the four sons, Baab Mashur Malamo, was born in heaven, and therefore enjoyed a special status. His descendants were sometimes known as Alam-ma-Kolano, "ruler of all [Maluku]".

Ternate along with neighbouring Tidore were the world's single major producer of cloves, due to which their rulers became among the wealthiest and most powerful sultans in the Indonesian region. Much of their wealth, however, was spent fighting each other. Until the Dutch completed the colonisation of Maluku in the 19th century, the Sultans of Ternate ruled realms that claimed at least nominal influence as far as Ambon, Sulawesi and Papua.

In part due to its trade-dependent culture, Ternate was one of the earliest places in the region to which Islam spread from Java in the late 15th century. However, Islamic influence in the area can be traced further back to the late 14th century. Initially, the faith was restricted to Ternate's small ruling family, and spread slowly to the rest of the population.

The royal family of Ternate converted to Islam during the reign of Marhum (1465–1486), making him the first King of Ternate that embraced Islam; his son and successor, Zainal Abidin (1486–1500) enacted Islamic Law and transformed the kingdom into an Islamic Sultanate; the title Kolano (king) was then replaced with Sultan.

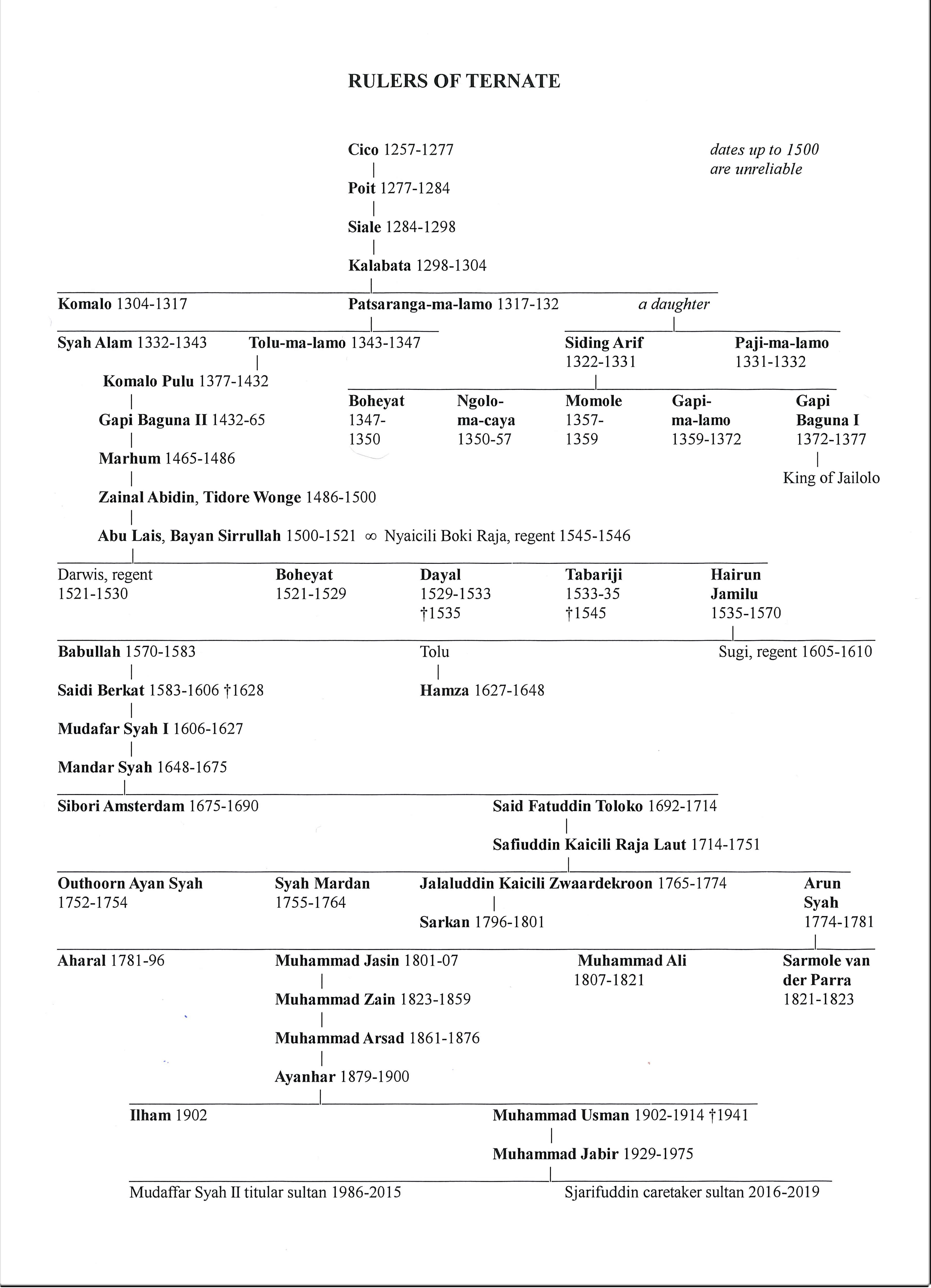
Genealogy of the rulers of Ternate

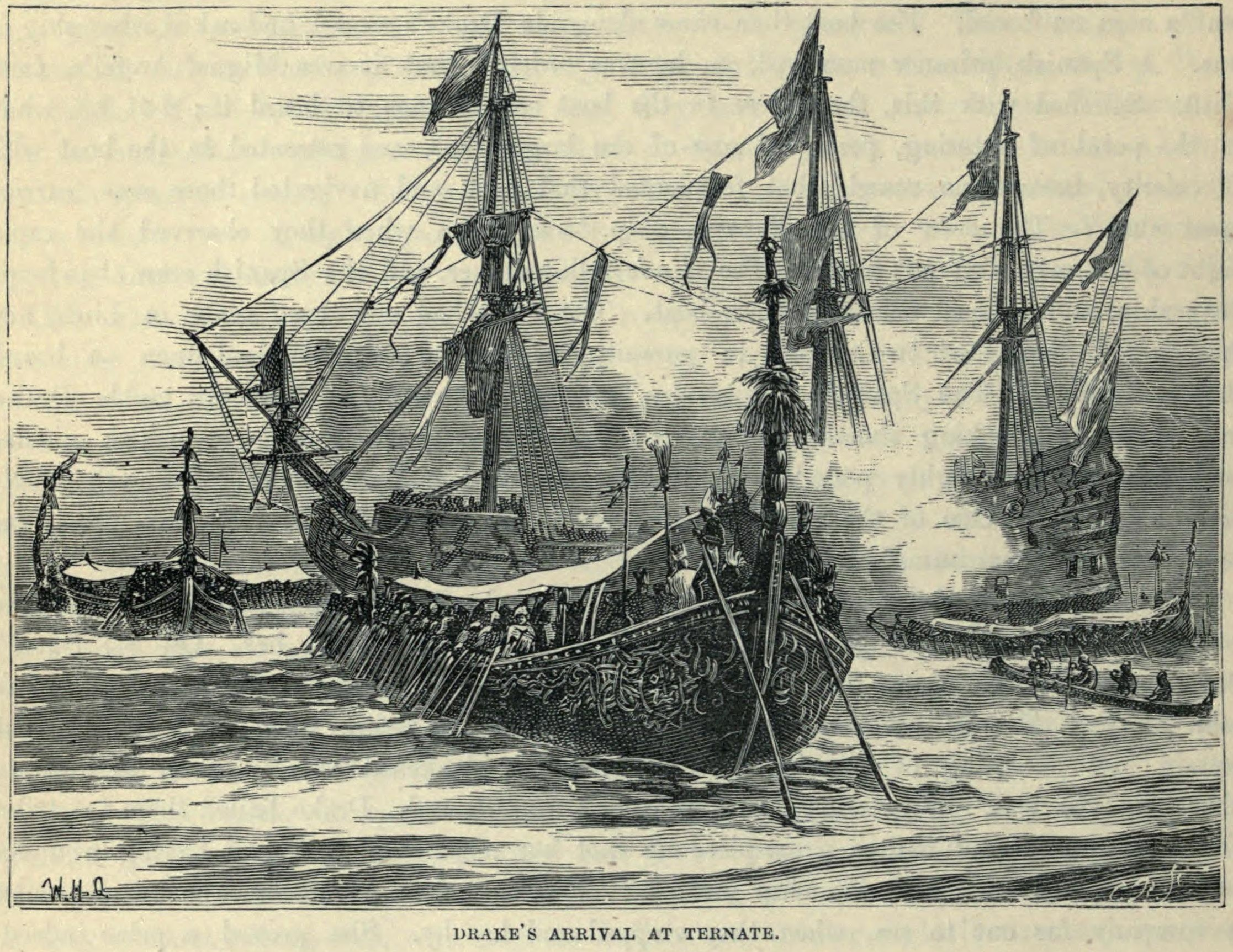
Ternatean galleys welcomed the arrival of Francis Drake.

The peak of Ternate's power came near the end of the 16th century, under Sultan Baabullah (1570–1583), when it had influence over most of the eastern part of Sulawesi, the Ambon and Seram area, Timor island, parts of southern Mindanao and Papuan Islands. It frequently engaged in fierce competition for control of its periphery with the nearby Sultanate of Tidore. According to historian Leonard Y. Andaya, Ternate's "dualistic" rivalry with Tidore is a dominant theme in the early history of the Maluku Islands.

Ternate was also often a part of the political affairs of Philippine kingdoms. In a punitive expedition, it once destroyed Bo-ol in the Central Visayas region, forcing the Boholanos to re-establish their kingdom in Northern Mindanao.

=== 16th century to the present ===
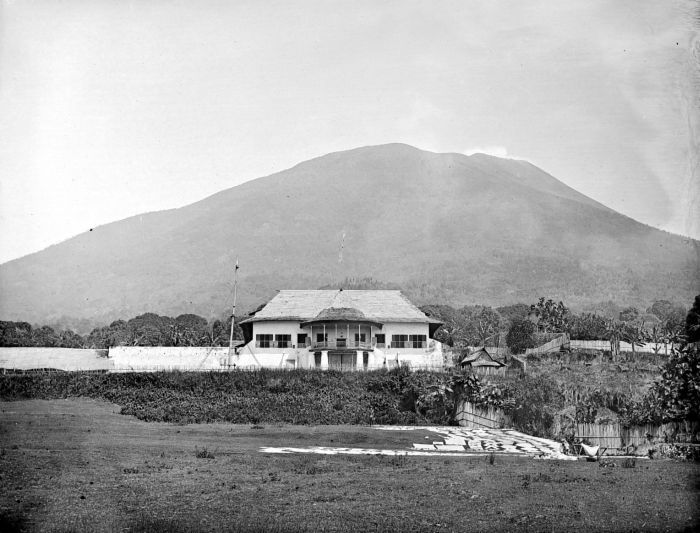
Kraton (palace) of the Sultan of Ternate

The first Europeans to stay on Ternate were part of the Portuguese expedition of Francisco Serrão out of Malacca, which was shipwrecked near Seram and rescued by local residents. Sultan Bayan Sirrullah of Ternate (1500–1522) heard of their stranding and, seeing a chance to ally himself with a powerful foreign nation, he brought them to Ternate in 1512. The Portuguese were permitted to build a fort on the island, today known as Kastella, construction of which began in 1522, but relations between the Ternateans and Portuguese were strained from the start. Ternate developed closer relations with the Ottomans as a result.

An outpost far from Europe generally only attracted the most desperate and avaricious, so that the generally poor behaviour of the Portuguese, combined with feeble attempts at Christianisation, strained relations with Ternate's Muslim ruler. In 1535 Sultan Tabariji was deposed and sent to Goa by the Portuguese. He converted to Christianity and changed his name to Dom Manuel. After being declared innocent of the charges against him he was sent back to re-assume his throne; however, he died en route in Malacca in 1545. He had though bequeathed the island of Ambon to his Portuguese godfather, Jordão de Freitas. Following the murder of Sultan Hairun at the hands of the Portuguese, the Ternatans expelled the Portuguese in 1575 after a five-year siege. Ambon became the new centre for Portuguese activities in Maluku. European power in the region was weak and Ternate became an expanding, fiercely Islamic and anti-Portuguese state under the rule of Sultan Baab Ullah (r. 1570–1583) and his son Sultan Saidi Berkat.

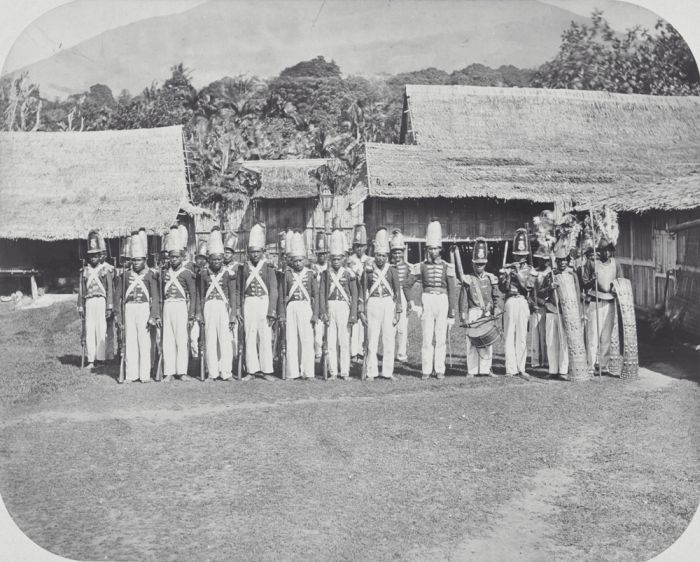
The Sultan's guard (1900-1920)

Spanish forces, aided by Filipinos mainly the Boholanos of the destroyed state of Bo-ol, who were formerly at war against Ternate, captured the former Portuguese fort from the Ternatans in 1606, deporting the Ternate Sultan and his entourage to Manila in the Spanish Philippines. The Spanish forced the Ternate ruler, Sultan Said Din Berkat to settle in Manila and pushed him to accept Christianity. In 1607 the Dutch came back to Ternate, where with the help of Ternatans they built a fort in Malayo. The island was divided between the two powers: the Spaniards were allied with Tidore and the Dutch with their Ternaten allies. For the Ternatan rulers, the Dutch were a useful, if not particularly welcome, presence that gave them military advantages against Tidore and the Spanish. Particularly under Sultan Hamzah (1627–1648), Ternate expanded its territory and strengthened its control over the periphery. Dutch influence over the kingdom was limited, though Hamzah and his grandnephew and successor, Sultan Mandar Syah (1648–1675) did concede some regions to the Dutch East India Company (VOC) in exchange for help controlling rebellions there. The Spaniards abandoned Maluku in 1663. They took the aristocracy of Moluccan-Portuguese and Filipino-Mexican mixed descent and settled them in Ternate, Cavite (Named after their homeland) in the Philippines, when they evacuated Ternate. Till this day, the Ternate community speak Ternateño Chavacano, a creole language of Spanish with Ternatean and Portuguese influence. In attempts to frustrate Spain, the Ternateans militarily supported the Sultanates of Mindanao in the Southern Philippines by sending reinforcement, during the Spanish-Moro Wars.

Desiring to restore Ternate to its former glory and expel the western power, Sultan Sibori Amsterdam (1675–1691) declared war to the Dutch, but the power of Ternate had greatly reduced over the years, he lost and was forced to concede more of his lands to the Dutch by a treaty in 1683. By this treaty, Ternate had lost its equal position with the Dutch and became a vassal. However, the Sultans of Ternate and its people were never fully under Dutch control until its annexation in 1914.

In the 18th century Ternate was the site of a VOC governorship, which attempted to control all trade in the northern Moluccas. By the 19th century, the spice trade had declined substantially. Hence the region was less central to the Netherlands colonial state, but the Dutch maintained a presence in the region to prevent another colonial power from occupying it. After the VOC was nationalised by the Dutch government in 1800, Ternate became part of the Government of the Moluccas (Gouvernement der Molukken). Ternate was seized and occupied by British forces in 1810 before being returned to Dutch control in 1817. In 1824 it became the capital of a residency (administrative region) covering Halmahera, the entire west coast of New Guinea, and the central east coast of Sulawesi. By 1867 all of Dutch-occupied New Guinea had been added to the residency, but then its region was gradually transferred to Ambon (Amboina) before being dissolved into that residency in 1922.

Sultan Haji Muhammad Usman (1902–1914) made a last attempt to oppose the Dutch by clandestinely endorsing revolts in the region; he failed and was dethroned, his wealth being confiscated, and he was exiled to Bandung, where he lived until 1932. This spelt the end of the traditional Ternatan kingdom, since the administration and settlement pattern were forcibly changed by the Dutch. The throne of Ternate was left vacant from 1914 to 1929, until the board of ministers under the blessing of the Dutch created Crown Prince Iskandar Muhammad Jabir the next Sultan.

Muhammad Jabir reigned when the Japanese arrived in 1942 and began a hard rule. Two years later he was smuggled to Australia by the Allies. The Sultan played a political role during the Indonesian Revolution, but the tense political situation pushed him to reside in Jakarta after 1950. He made attempts to revive the old body of traditions (adat) in the 1960s, but the sultanate lapsed after his death in 1975. His son Mudaffar was enthroned as a titular head in 1986. He restored many of the old royal traditions, though Ternate society was temporarily disturbed by sectarian violence in 1999. Sultan Mudaffar Sjah II died in 2015. The male members of his wife's family, the Dutch Van Gelders, were named Prince of Ternate in 2012, and tried to control the sultanate after Mudaffar's death.

== Administration of the Sultanate ==
The basic unit in Ternatan society was the soa, a territorial unit that consisted of descent groups that originated from a common ancestor. In Ternate, there were four groups of soa called Soa Sio, Soa Sangaji, Soa Heku and Soa Cim. These four were divided into 43 sub-soa. The palace or kadaton of the Sultan was at the center of this social order. The Soa Sio (nine soa) resided close to the ruler. Among the various descent groups, the houses of Marsaoli, Tomaito, Tomagola, and Tamadi were highest in rank, being collectively known as Fala Raha (the Four Houses). Their leaders bore the title kimalaha. When Ternate expanded its territory in the 16th century, Fala Raha leaders set themselves up as governors in various parts of Maluku. The most important was Tomagola whose members governed in the Ambon Quarter and were based on the Hoamoal Peninsula on Ceram up to 1656.

Detailed records about the administration are known from the 17th century onwards. By that time, the Sultan governed with the help of a council that consisted of eighteen dignitaries called bobato, consisting of the leaders of the nine soas of Soa Sio and the nine of Soa Sangaji. Apart from these, the ruler consulted four officials known as bobato ma dopolo. The most important was the first minister (jogugu), who was ideally a member of Marsaoli, the oldest noble house. He was counted as the authochtonous "lord of the land" in relation to the Sultan who supposedly had foreign origins. Other main officials were the sea lord (kapitan laut) and two magistrates (hukum) who saw it that the commands of the jogugu were followed by the soa leaders. Inside the palace, the secretary or jurutulis had important tasks as archivist and caretaker of communications with other realms. For economic relationships, the syahbandar was an important figure who served as contact between the Sultan and foreign traders.

The Sultan was the religious and political headman of the realm. As the main representative of the Islamic community, he was known as amir ul mu'minin, leader of the believers. Under him were various religious dignitaries who were collectively known as bobato akhirat. They included judges (kadi), imams, preachers (khatib) and leaders of prayers (modin). The most important figures were four imams from Soa Sio and Soa Sangaji, who were known as imam jiko, imam jawa, imam sangaji, and imam moti.

Outside of Ternate, the Sultan held suzerainty over a realm shifting in size, usually including parts of Halmahera, Buru, the Ambon Quarter, the Sula Islands, and the east coast of Sulawesi. Local Malukan rulers who acknowledged Ternate's rule were called sangaji and must send tribute to the Sultan. Fields in Halmahera and elsewhere which belonged to the royal court, were worked by serfs called ngofangare and non-Muslim locals, so-called Alfurs. These workers provided the court with provisions such as sago, meat, palm wine, betel, wood, and water. Most importantly, they tended and harvested the clove trees, which gave the Sultan most of his income up to the onset of Dutch colonialism.

== List of sultans ==
Kolano of Ternate	Reign
Baab Mashur Malamo [Cico]	1257–1277
Poit [Jamin Qadrat]	1277–1284
Komala 'Abu Said [Siale]	1284–1298
Bakuku [Kalabata]	1298–1304
Ngara Malamo [Komala]	1304–1317
Patsaranga Malamo [Aitsi]	1317–1322
Cili Aiya [Sidang Arif Malamo]	1322–1331
Paji Malamo [A'ali]	1331–1332
Shah Alam	1332–1343
Tolu Malamo [Fulu]	1343–1347
Kie Mabiji [Buhayati I]	1347–1350
Ngolo-ma-Caya [Muhammad Shah]	1350–1357
Mamoli [Momole]	1357–1359
Gapi Malamo [Muhammad Bakar]	1359–1372
Gapi Baguna I	1372–1377
Komala Pulu [Bessi Muhammad Hassan]	1377–1432
Marhum [Gapi Baguna II]	1432–1486
Zainal Abidin	1486–1500
Bayan Sirrullah	1500–1522
Abu Hayat	1522–1529
Hidayatullah	1529–1533
Tabariji	1533–1535
Hairun Jamilu	1535–1570
Babullah Datu Shah	1570–1583
Said Barakat Shah	1583–1606
Muzaffar Shah I	1607–1627
Hamzah	1627–1648
Mandar Shah [Manlarsaha]	1648–1650
Manilha	1650–1651
Mandar Shah	1651–1675
Sibori Amsterdam	1675–1689
Said Fathullah	1689–1714
Amir Iskandar Zulkarnain Saifuddin	1714–1751
Ayan Shah	1751–1754
Syah Mardan	1755–1763
Jalaluddin	1763–1774
Harun Shah	1774–1781
Ahrad	1781–1796
Muhammad Yasin	1796–1801
Muhammad Ali	1807–1821
Muhammad Sarmoli	1821–1823
Muhammad Zain	1823–1859
Muhammad Arsyad	1859–1876
Ayanhar	1879–1900
Muhammad Ilham [Kolano Ara Rimoi]	1900–1902
Haji Muhammad Usman Shah	1902–1915
Iskandar Muhammad Jabir Shah	1929–1975
Haji Muzaffar Shah II [Dr Mudaffar Syah]	1975–2016
Sjarifuddin Sjah	2016-2019
Hidayatullah Sjah	2021-present

== Palace ==
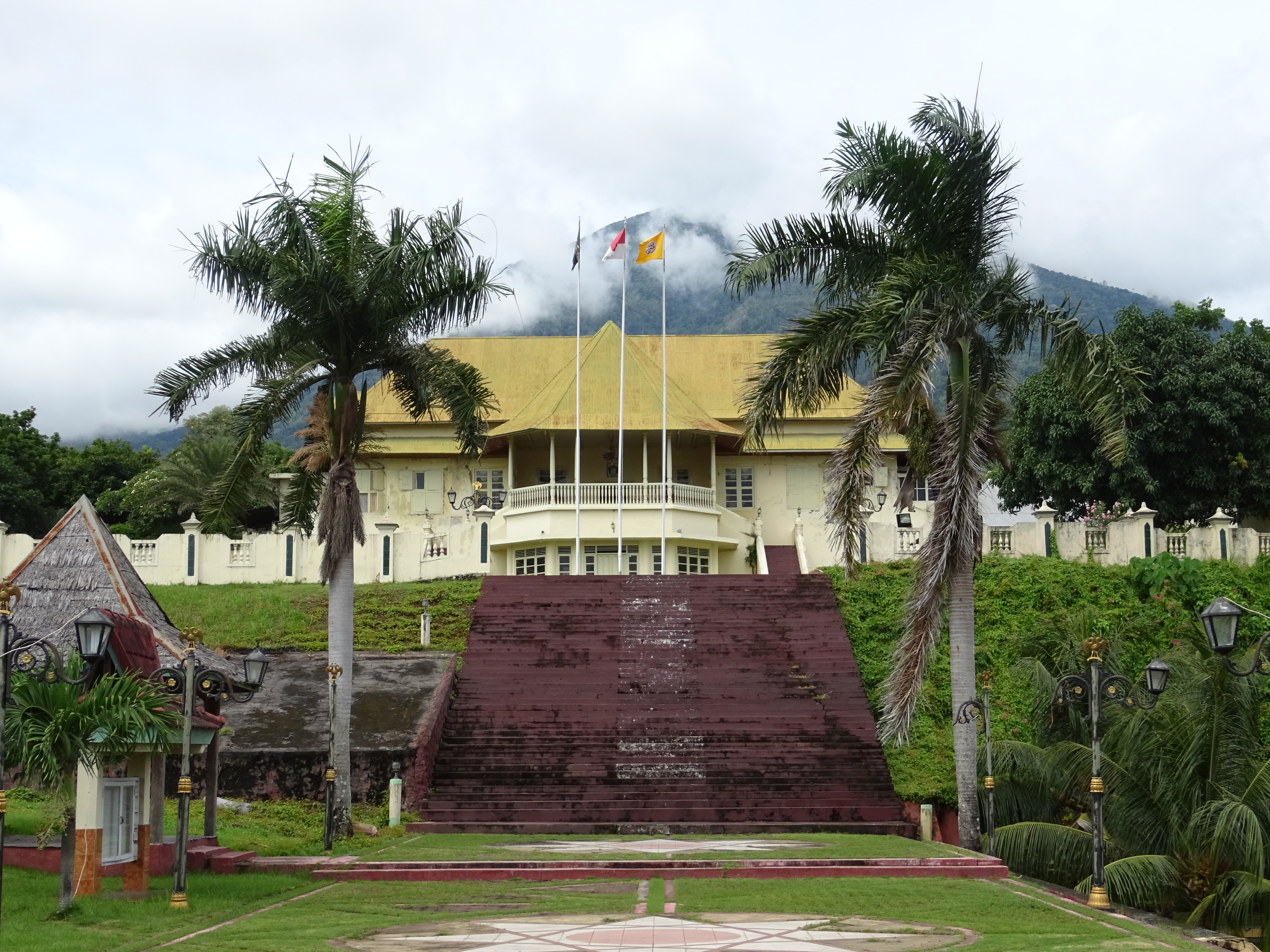
The sultan's palace today

The old sultan's palace was abandoned between 1781 and 1813, when construction of the existing palace (kadaton) began. It was restored in a semi-colonial style and is now partly a museum as well as the sultan's home. The museum exhibits the genealogy of the Ternatean royal family from 1257, a collection of Portuguese and Dutch helmets, swords and armour, and memorabilia from the previous sultans.

== Legacy ==
The eastern Indonesian archipelago empire led by Ternate had indeed fallen apart since the middle of the 17th century but the influence of Ternate as a kingdom with a long history continued to be felt until centuries later. Ternate has a very large share in the eastern archipelago culture, especially Sulawesi (north and east coast) and Maluku. These influences include religion, customs and language.

As the first kingdom to embrace Islam, Ternate had a large role in the efforts to convert and introduce Islamic Sharia in the eastern part of the archipelago and the southern part of the Philippines. The form of the organization of the empire and the application of Islamic law which was first introduced by Sultan Zainal Abidin and later implemented by his successors in the 16th century, became the standard followed by all the kingdoms in Maluku without significant changes.

The success of the Ternate people under Sultan Baabullah in expelling Portugal in 1575, was the first indigenous victory of an archipelagic polity over western powers. The 20th-century writer Buya Hamka praised the victory of the Ternate people as it delayed the western occupation of the archipelago for 100 years while at the same time strengthening the position of Islam. If Ternate had not halted European political and missionary efforts, the eastern part of Indonesia might have become a Christian center like the Philippines.

The position of Ternate as an influential kingdom also helped raise the degree of Ternate Language as the language of association in various regions which were under its influence. E.K.M Masinambouw, in his text "Ternate Language in the context of Austronesian and Non-Austronesian languages", suggested that Ternate had the greatest impact on the Malay language used by the people of eastern Indonesia. 46% of Malay vocabulary in Manado is taken from Ternate. Ternate Malay or North Moluccan Malay language is now widely used in Eastern Indonesia, especially in North Sulawesi, the east coast of Central and South Sulawesi, Maluku and Papua with different dialects.

Two original letters by Sultan Abu Hayat II to the King of Portugal, the first written between 27 April and 8 November 1521 and the second in early 1522, are recognized as the oldest Malay manuscripts in the world after the Tanjung Tanah manuscripts. Abu Hayat's letters are currently stored in the Museum of Lisbon, Portugal.

== See also ==
- Spice trade
- Portuguese-Ternate wars
- List of Sunni Muslim dynasties
- List of rulers of Maluku
