= Fort Tahula =

Spanish fortification in Indonesia

Coordinates: 0.6481°N 127.4421°E

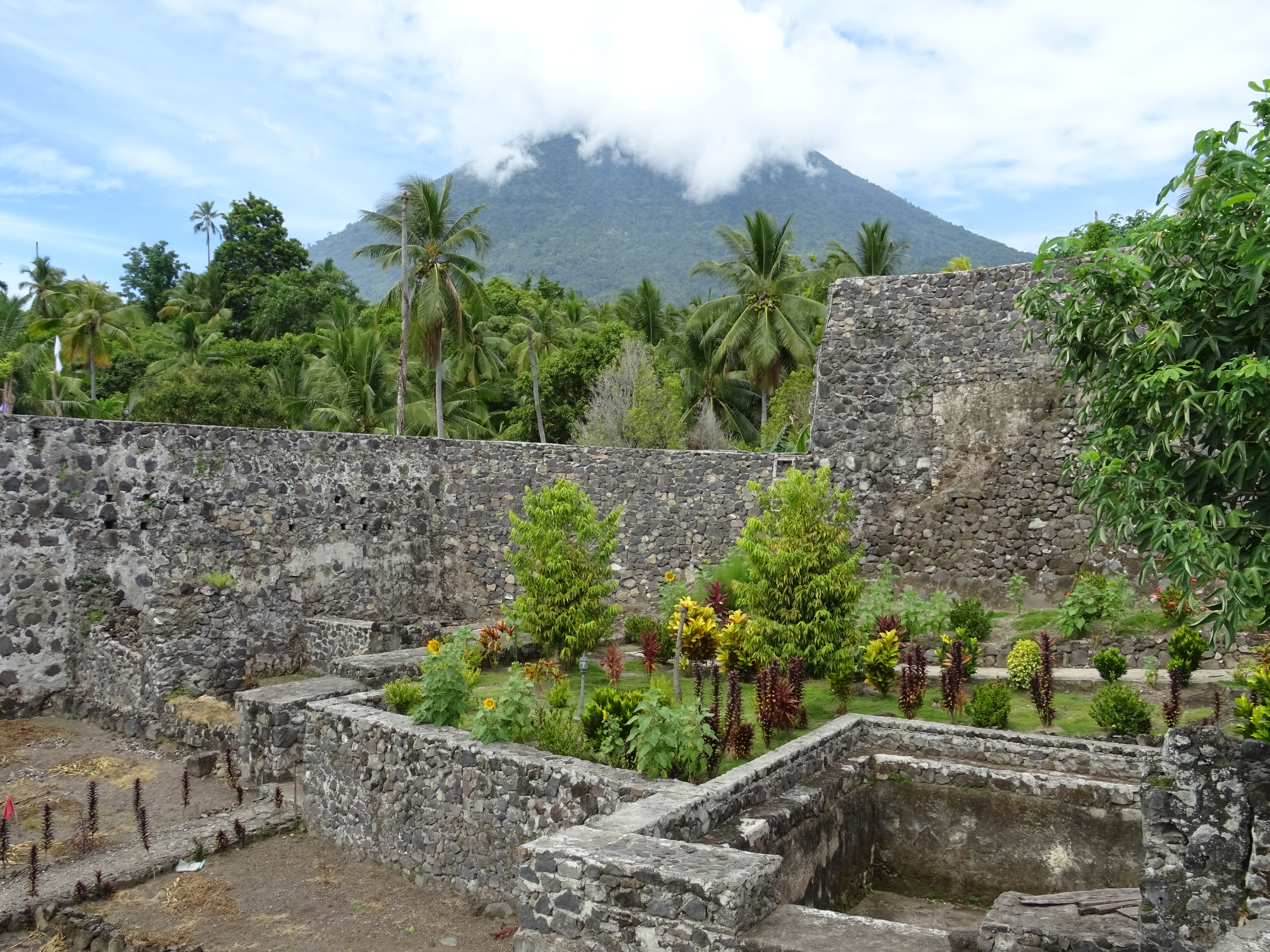
- Tahula Fort in the island of Tidore, Maluku
- Interactive map of the Fort Tahula area

General information
- Architectural style: Spanish
- Location: Tidore
- Construction started: 1609
- Completed: 1615

Technical details
- Structural system: Stone built artillery fort

Fort Tahula (also spelled Tohula, Indonesian: Benteng Tahula) is a 17th-century colonial fortification located in the city of Tidore built by the Spanish Empire during their colonial presence in the Indonesian Archipelago. The fort was built in 1609 by the Spaniards to defend their troops in the island.

== History ==
The construction of this fort was started by the first Spanish governor of the Moluccas, Juan de Esquivel. The construction began in 1609 and was briefly delayed due to the lack of labor workers, it was later continued by the second governor, Cristobal de Azcqueta Menchaca. The fort was finished in 1615, and was named Santiago de los Caballeros de Tidore or, in one of the unstable spellings of the period, Sanctiago de los Caualleros de la ysla de Tidore. The Spanish occupied and controlled the fort until 1662 when the Dutch East India Company (VOC) took it over.

The VOC allowed Sultan Saifuddin of Tidore to stay in the fort and made it his residence. In 1799 Sultan Nuku upgraded the fort by adding canons and ammunitions to prepare for his plans to attack the VOC.

The Dutch once destroyed the fort in 1707.

== Building ==
Fort Tahula is located in the regency of Soasio, Tidore Island.

The Fort has a rectangular plan and consists of four buildings made of natural stone. There are several elements that can be seen in this fort building, namely bastions, tombs, inner courtyards, rooms in the fort, stairs, and ponds. In the interior of the fort, there is a room with a semicircular door. There are also bastions in the form of triangles and circles.
