= Mudaffar Sjah =

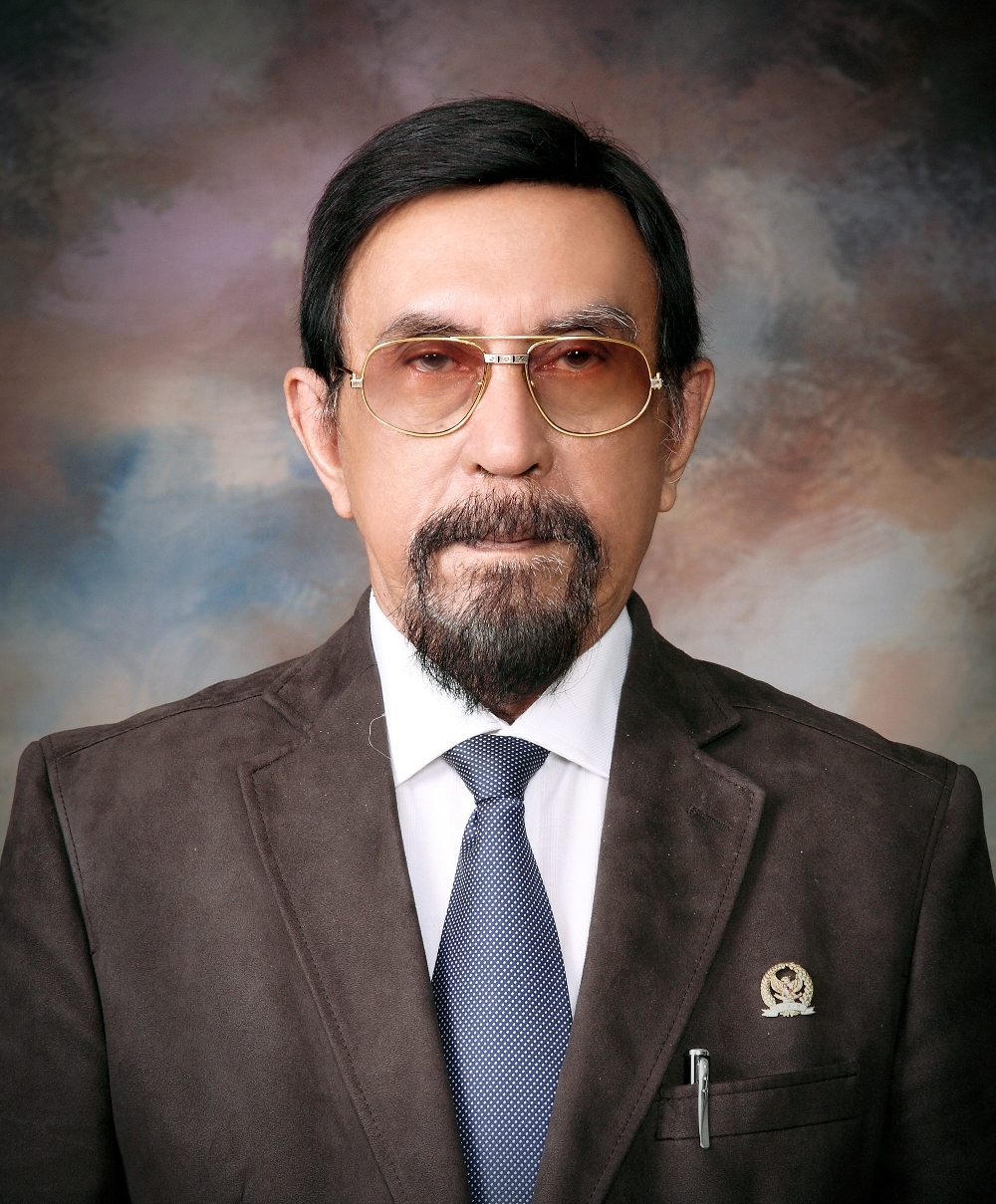
- Official portrait of Mudaffar Sjah as a member of the Regional Representative Council of the Republic of Indonesia period 2014-2019

Sultan of Ternate
- Reign: 1975 – 19 February 2015
- Coronation: 1986
- Predecessor: Mohammad Djabir Sjah
- Successor: Sjarifuddin Sjah
- Born: 13 April 1935; Dufa Dufa, Ternate, Dutch East Indies
- Died: 19 February 2015 (aged 79); South Jakarta, Indonesia
- Father: Mohammad Djabir Sjah
- Mother: Boki Maryam

Mudaffar Sjah II (13 April 1935 – 19 February 2015) was the 48th Sultan of Ternate from 1975 until his death. Although his position as monarch was ceremonial rather than executive, he was a prominent local politician whose career was temporarily interrupted by sectarian violence in 1999.

== Early life and enthronement ==
Mudaffar was born on 13 April 1935 in Dufa Dufa on Ternate as the third son of the 47th Sultan of Ternate, Mohammad Djabir Sjah. He was educated in Ternate, Makassar and Jakarta. However, his youth coincided with the Independence of Indonesia and the winding down of traditional forms of rule. Mohammad Djabir had little authority after 1950 as he stayed permanently in Jakarta, and in 1965 a law deprived the North Malukan Sultans their rights of representation in the administration. Mudaffar came back to Ternate in 1966 and was active in a movement to restore the adat (body of traditions) of the old sultanate. His followers regarded him as his father's heir. However, the old Sultan Mohammad Djabir meddled in the local politics from his base in Jakarta, leading to internal conflicts between factions. In 1968 Mudaffar was ordered by the government to put a stop to the restoration movement. In the elections for the regional North Maluku Assembly in 1971, he was a candidate for the ruling Golkar party, and was actually elected. The prince was seen as an unlikely candidate to succeed his father as Sultan, but in 1975 on the death of his father he was chosen as heir apparent. He was inaugurated as the new Sultan in 1986. However, the central authorities in Jakarta made clear that they regarded the installation as non-official.

== Political career and later life ==
In 1977 Mudaffar Sjah became member of the People's Representative Council of Indonesia (DPR). He served as member of the political party Golkar. In 1987, one year after his inauguration as Sultan, he became provincial chairman of the party in North Maluku. After the outbreak of communal violence in Ambon in 1999, disturbances temporarily spilled over to North Maluku which was just about to be reconstituted as a new province, with the Sultan as one of the candidates for the governorship. Mudaffar made efforts to protect the local Christians from persecution, but fighting broke out in November 1999 between followers of the Sultan and forces loyal to his rivals for the governorship of North Maluku. The Sultan of Tidore joined the adversaries, blowing new life in the age-old rivalry between Ternate and Tidore. The fighting drove Christians to flight to other islands and was followed by severe massacres in Tobelo in Halmahera. Mudaffar was temporarily removed from Ternate by the central authorities, though he soon returned. Fighting in North Maluku receded in 2001, and the Sultan was at length able to keep a strong position locally.

Apart from his position as Sultan he also served on the North Maluku Representatives Council. As a leader, he was locally considered to be a judicious and fair person who took the right decisions and was able to reconstruct the traditions of the sultanate after a long hiatus.

In 2013 Mudaffar Sjah appeared in the second episode of Bill Bailey's Jungle Hero, where Bailey had an audience with the Sultan to request permission to search for birds-of-paradise in the former territories of the Sultanate.

He suffered from lung cancer before his death in the Pondok Indah Hospital in South Jakarta on 19 February 2015 at age 79. His death was followed by disputes within the family as to which son was entitled to head the Sultanate; eventually his brother Sjarifuddin Sjah was appointed in 2016.

== Family ==
Sultan Mudaffar Sjah married the following wives:

- Nelly Manoppo from Menado
- Thalha binti Marhi
- Drevenlya Amahorsea from Ambon
- Nita Budhi Susanti from Java

He had fifteen children, nine sons and six daughters, including:

- Iskandar Sjah
- Ronny Muhammad Ghazali Sjah
- Muhammad Usman Sjah
- Hidayat Sjah
- Nuzuluddin Sjah
- Firman Mudaffar Sjah
- Syahmardan Sjah
- Ali Muhammad Sjah
- Gajah Mada Sjah
- Monalisa Mihir Sjah
- Soraya Sjah
- Aya Sofia Sjah
- Wiriawati Mudaffar Sjah
- Nabila Maryam Sjah
- Azka Nukila Sjah

From the previously mentioned children, he managed to have the following grandchild:

- Randy Putra
- Windy Puspita
- Kenth Boheyat Tanjung
- Cythia Carissa
- Hagia Sophia Sjah
- Arra Sjah Malamo
- Tarra Pastaranga

== See also ==
- List of rulers of Maluku
- Sultanate of Ternate
- Maluku sectarian conflict

Mudaffar Sjah
Preceded by Sultan Mohammad Djabir Sjah	Sultan of Ternate; 1975–2015	Succeeded by Sjarifuddin Sjah
