= François Valentyn =

Dutch writer and minister (1666–1727)

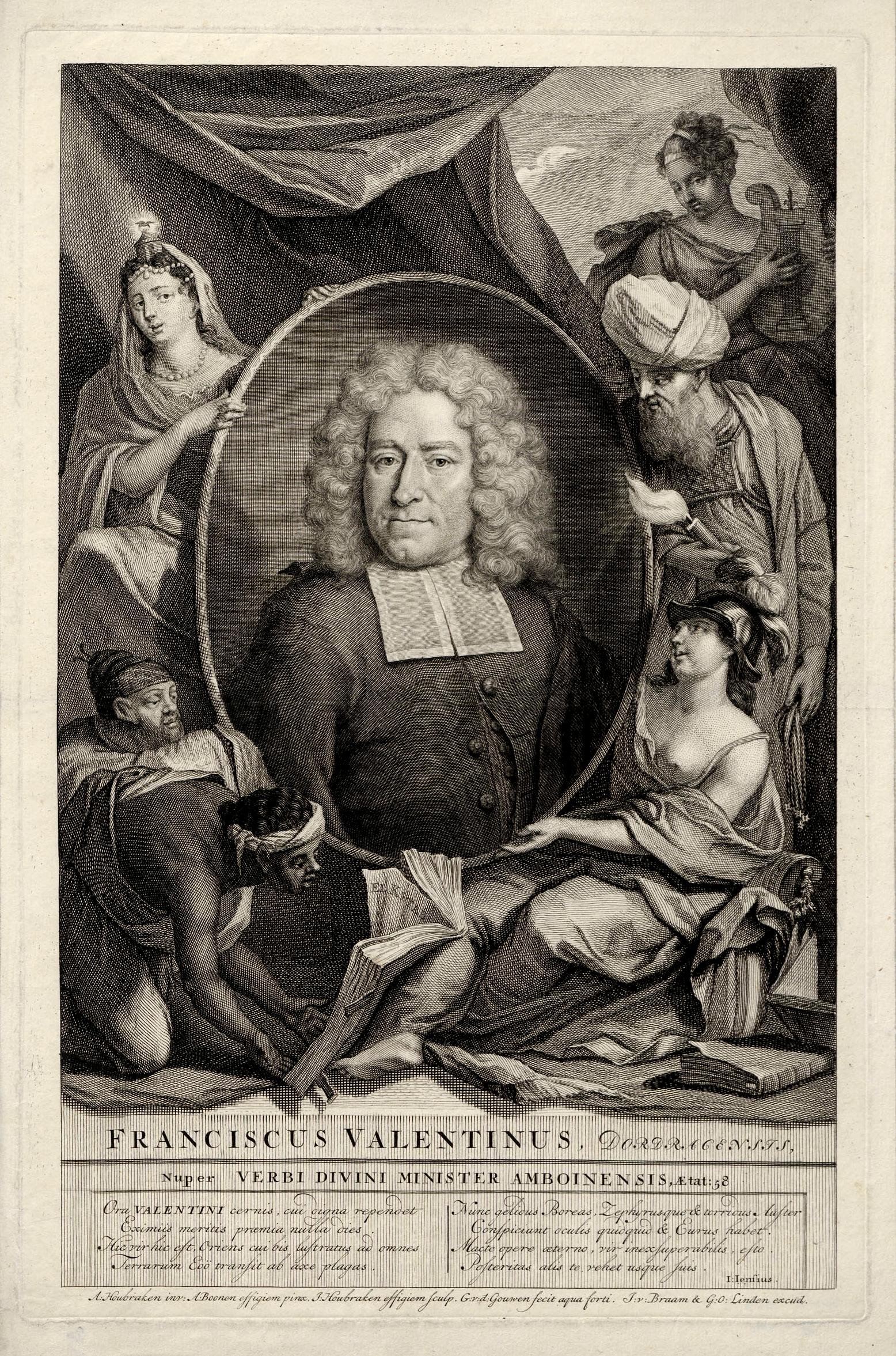
François Valentyn.

François Valentyn or Valentijn (17 April 1666 – 6 August 1727) was a Dutch Calvinist minister, naturalist and author whose Oud en Nieuw Oost-Indiën ("Old and New East-India") describes the history of the Dutch East India Company while also making notes on geography, ethnography, and natural history; half is about the Moluccas. The work is characterised by vanity, randomness, imbalance and the lack of systematics. Valentyn even used sources that he considered unreliable and some of his descriptions were considered far-fetched.

== Biography ==
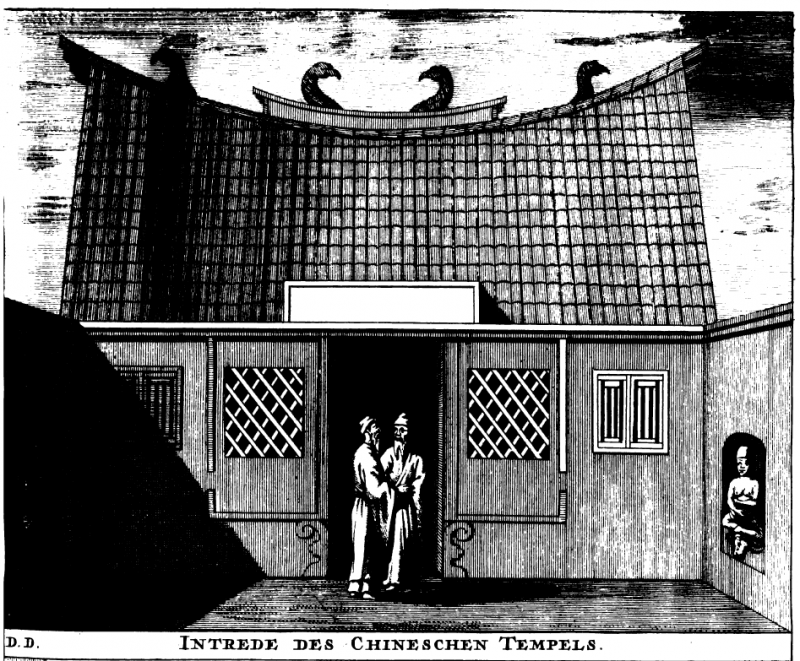
Kim Tek Ie Temple in Batavia by Valentyn

François Valentyn was born in 1666 in Dordrecht, Holland, where he lived most his life; however, he is known for his activities in Southeast Asia, notably in Ambon, in the Maluku Islands. Valentyn read theology and philosophy at the University of Leiden and the University of Utrecht before leaving for a career as a preacher in the Indies.

Valentyn lived in the East Indies for 16 years, he was first employed by the VOC (Vereenigde Oost-Indische Compagnie) at the age of 19 as minister to the East Indies, where he became a friend of the German naturalist Georg Eberhard Rumpf. He returned and lived in Holland for about ten years before returning to the Indies in 1705 where he was to serve as army chaplain on an expedition in eastern Java. When he finally returned to Dordrecht he would go on to write his Oud en Nieuw Oost-Indiën (1724–26) a massive work of five parts published in eight volumes and containing 1,200 engraved illustrations and some of the most accurate maps of the Indies of the time.

Apart from Malay manuscripts, he had Indian miniatures at his disposal, which Valentyn used not only as illustration material but also as a historical source. Cornelis Jan Simonsz, a former governor of Dutch Ceylon, gave him translations of chronicles of the Sinhalese kings.

== Writings ==
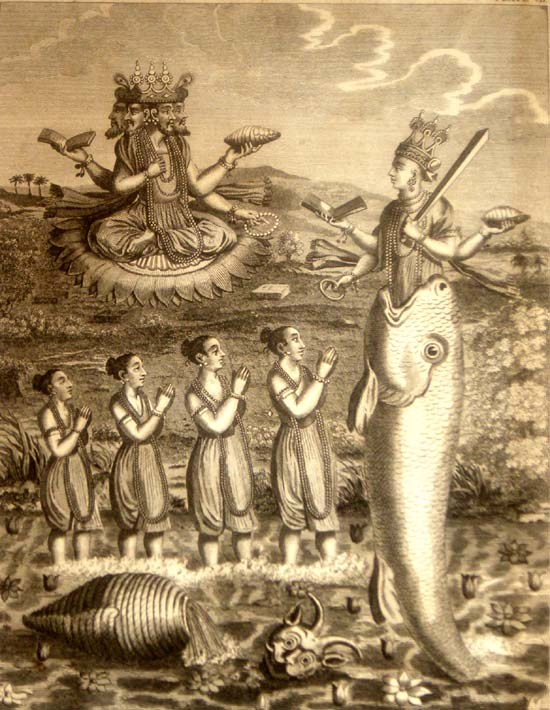
Print of a Matsya based on Valentyn

Valentyn probably had access to the VOC's archive of maps and geographic trade secrets, which they had always guarded jealously. Johannes II van Keulen (d. 1755) became hydrographer to the VOC, at the time Valentyn's Oud en Nieuw Oost-Indiën was published. It was in Van Keulen's time that many of the VOC charts were first published, one signal of the decline of Dutch dominance in the silver and spice trade. One uncommon grace afforded Valentijn was that he lived to see his work published; the VOC strictly enforced a policy prohibiting former employees from publishing anything about the region or their colonial administration. And while, as Suárez notes, by the mid-18th century the Dutch no longer feared sharing geographic secrets, Beekman notes how "the execution of this policy was erratic and based on personal motives".

While Valentyn's maps and diagrams were prized possessions, his scholarship, is now considered unscrupulous. He included illustrations of a merman who he claimed to have seen in May 1714 on the way from Old Batavia to Holland. He however did describe some molluscs and fishes with engravings. Valentyn's use of the products of other scientists' and writers' intellectual labour, passing it off as his own, reveals a penchant for self-aggrandisement. Many of the natural history illustrations were copied from Rumpf's Het Amboinsche Kruid-boek. Several fish illustrations were copied from Poissons, Ecrévisses et Crabes published in 1718 by Louis Renard. Beekman nevertheless cites him as an important figure and, given his writing style, diction and aptitude for narrative, considers him one of the greatest Dutch prose writers of all time.

He died in The Hague, Netherlands in 1727. In 2003/2004, the complete work was published again as a facsimile. With this, the stipulation in Valentyn's will that the work would never be republished was broken.

As a famous Dutch writer, Valentyn wrote a number of famous quotes in the books stated above:

"Their language, Malay, is not only spoken in seaside areas but also in the Malay islands, and the Eastern Southeast Asian islands, as a language that everyone can understand anywhere by anyone, like Latin in Europe..."

== Bibliography ==
- Valentijn, François (1724). Oud en Nieuw Oost-Indiën (in Dutch). Te Dordrecht: By Joannes van Braam, boekverkooper. OL 25412097M.
- Huigen, Siegfried (2009) Het historiografische gebruik van Aziatische bronnen door François Valentyn 'Kennis van zeer veel fraeje zaaken'. ('Knowledge of many beautiful things.' The historiographic use of Asian sources by François Valentyn). In: Nieuw Letterkundig Magazijn 27, nr. 1, p. 23-30.
