= Fort Kota Janji =

Historic Portuguese fortress in Indonesia

General information
- Type: Fortress
- Location: Jalan Ngade, Dusun Laguna, Desa Fitu, Kecamatan Ternate Selatan, Provinsi Maluku Utara, Indonesia
- Construction started: in or after 1522
- Owner: Balai Pelestarian Nilai Budaya Ambon

Technical details
- Grounds: 2,147.25 square metres (0.214725 ha)

Fort Kota Janji (Portuguese: Fortaleza Saõ Jõaõ, Spanish: Fortaleza San Pedro y San Pablo) is a Portuguese fortress located at Jalan Ngade, Laguna Hamlet, Fitu Village, South Ternate District, Ternate, North Maluku Province. It is located on the side of the main road to Ternate City from the south. The fort, which stands firmly at a height of 50 metres (160 ft) above sea level, was originally built during the Portuguese colonial period. Construction was possibly initiated by Governor António de Brito in about 1522. It is locally believed that it was named Fort Kota Janji (Mal. ‘’janji’’, pledge) because it became a silent witness to the peace treaty between Sultan Hairun and the Portuguese Governor. However, the Portuguese broke their vows and took the sultan's life in nearby Fort Kastela in 1570. In 2004, restoration work was done at the site of the fort, but only through beautifying the area around the fort by creating a park and build a fence surrounding the site. However, the original shape of the fort is no longer visible.

== History ==
An early fort was built in or after 1522 by the Portuguese. This was a modest bulwark with some light artillery, situated close to the main fortress Gammalamo. However, due to the assassination of Sultan Hairun (r. 1535–1570), the Portuguese were expelled from Ternate Island in 1575 by the local population which was led by Sultan Babullah. The fort was later overrun by Spanish forces led by Governor Don Pedro Bravo de Acuña who came from Manila in 1606 in order to take control over Ternate Island. In 1609, the Spanish commander Lucas de Vergara Gaviria initiated work on a renovated fortification with three bastions at the site. It was reinforced by the Spanish by placing 27 Spanish and 20 Portuguese soldiers together with several men of Filipino origins, complete with six cannons and ammunition. The fort was later named "Fort San Pedro y Pablo", in honour of Governor Pedro. In addition to being used to oversee the waters between Ternate and Tidore, the fort also had a role as a military base, and was unsuccessfully attacked by the Dutch in 1609 and 1612. If sea conditions were calm, Spanish fleets sailing from the Philippines could dock on the southern coast by the fort, which facilitated logistics.

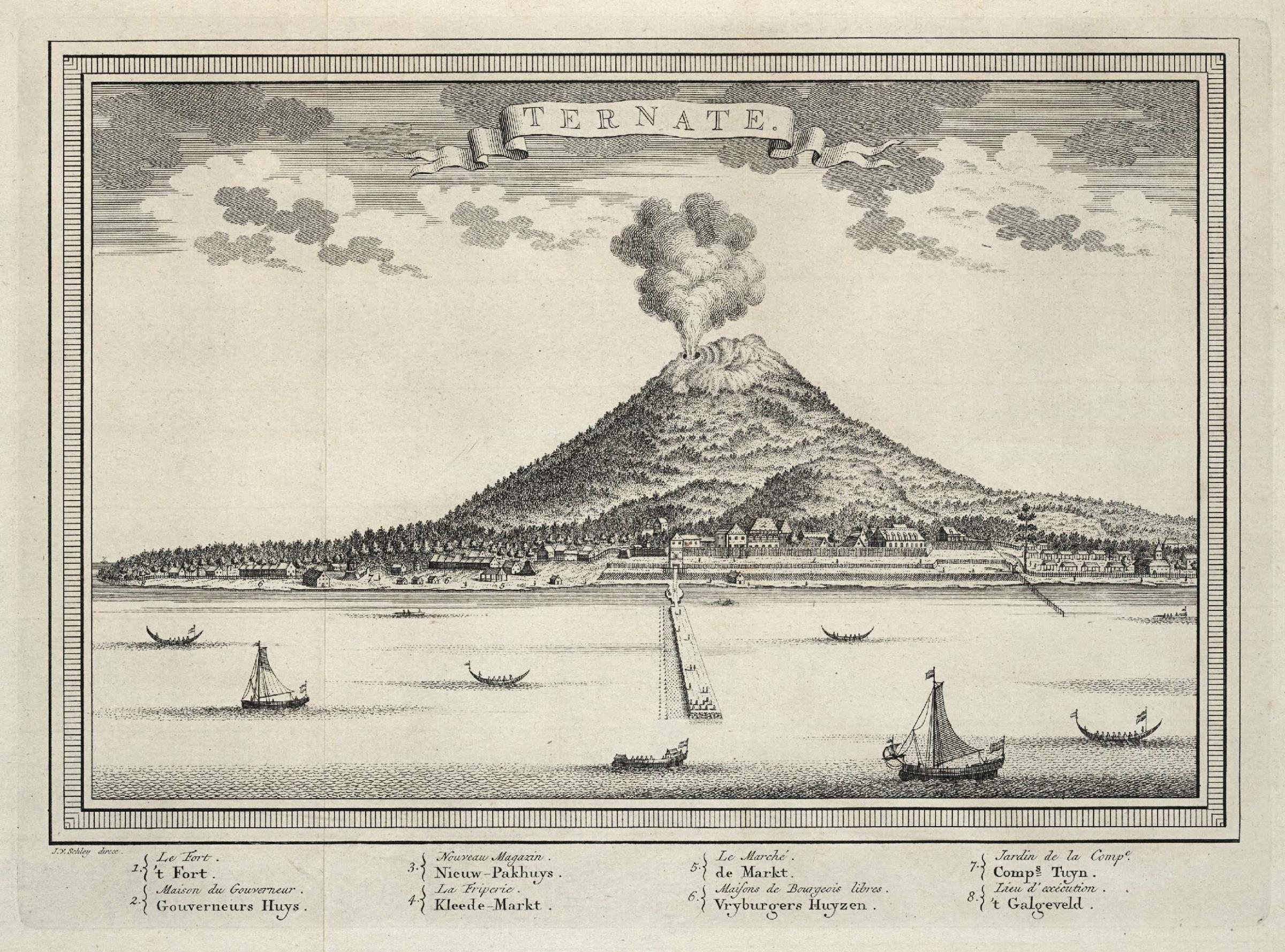
Ternate in about 1753

The fort was situated in a war zone during much of the 17th century. Southern Ternate with the main fortress Gammalamo was defended by the Spanish garrison against the encroaching Dutch who were ensconced at the eastern side of the island and allied with the Sultans of Ternate. Together with the other Iberian fortresses in Ternate and Tidore, San Pedro y San Pablo was eventually abandoned when the Spaniards left Maluku in 1663. Southern Ternate then came under the rule of the Dutch East India Company. By the late 20th century the fortress was an abandoned site. The sandy area around the fort was also ignored until there was an abrasion and most of the fort was flooded with seawater. It was not until 1994 that the fortress was restored by the Ministry of Education and Culture of the Republic of Indonesia, so that it was kept intact without reducing the original shape of the fort.
