= Mount Hiri =

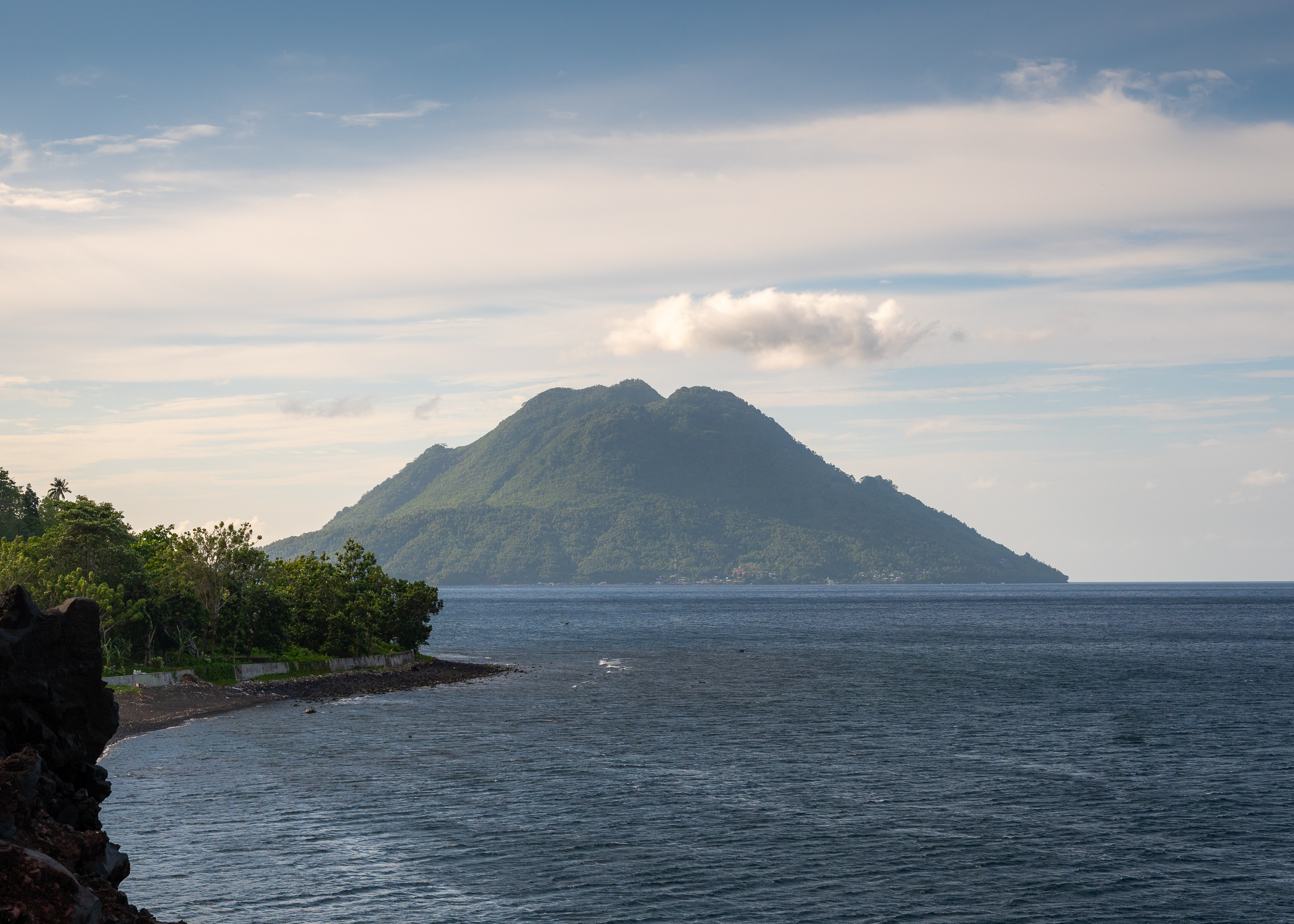

Highest point
- Elevation: 630 m (2,070 ft)
- Listing: List of volcanoes in Indonesia
- Coordinates: 0°54′N 127°19′E

Geography
- Location within Indonesia
- Location: North Maluku, Indonesia

Geology
- Mountain type: Volcanic cone

Hiri is a small, 3-kilometre-wide forested island immediately north of the island of Ternate, in the Maluku Islands of Indonesia. It is located at the northernmost part of a chain of volcanic islands off the western coast of Halmahera. It is a conical stratovolcano which rises to 630 m (2,067 ft). The island covers 9.72 km^{2} and had a population of 2,880 in mid 2023; it is administered as a district (kecamatan) of the City of Ternate. Its dominant neighbour to the south is the more active volcano of Mount Gamalama (1716 m), on Ternate island.

This island was used by Z Special Unit (Z Force), the mainly Australian special operations group active in this area during World War II, on April 9–10, 1945, to take the then Sultan of Ternate, Iskander Muhammad Jabir Syah, to safety from the occupying Japanese forces. The Sultan and his family were rowed at night from Ternate across to Hiri Island, where Z Force protected them from the Japanese troops the next day. He and his family were shortly after taken by U.S. Navy PT boat to Morotai Island.
