= Tolire Lake =

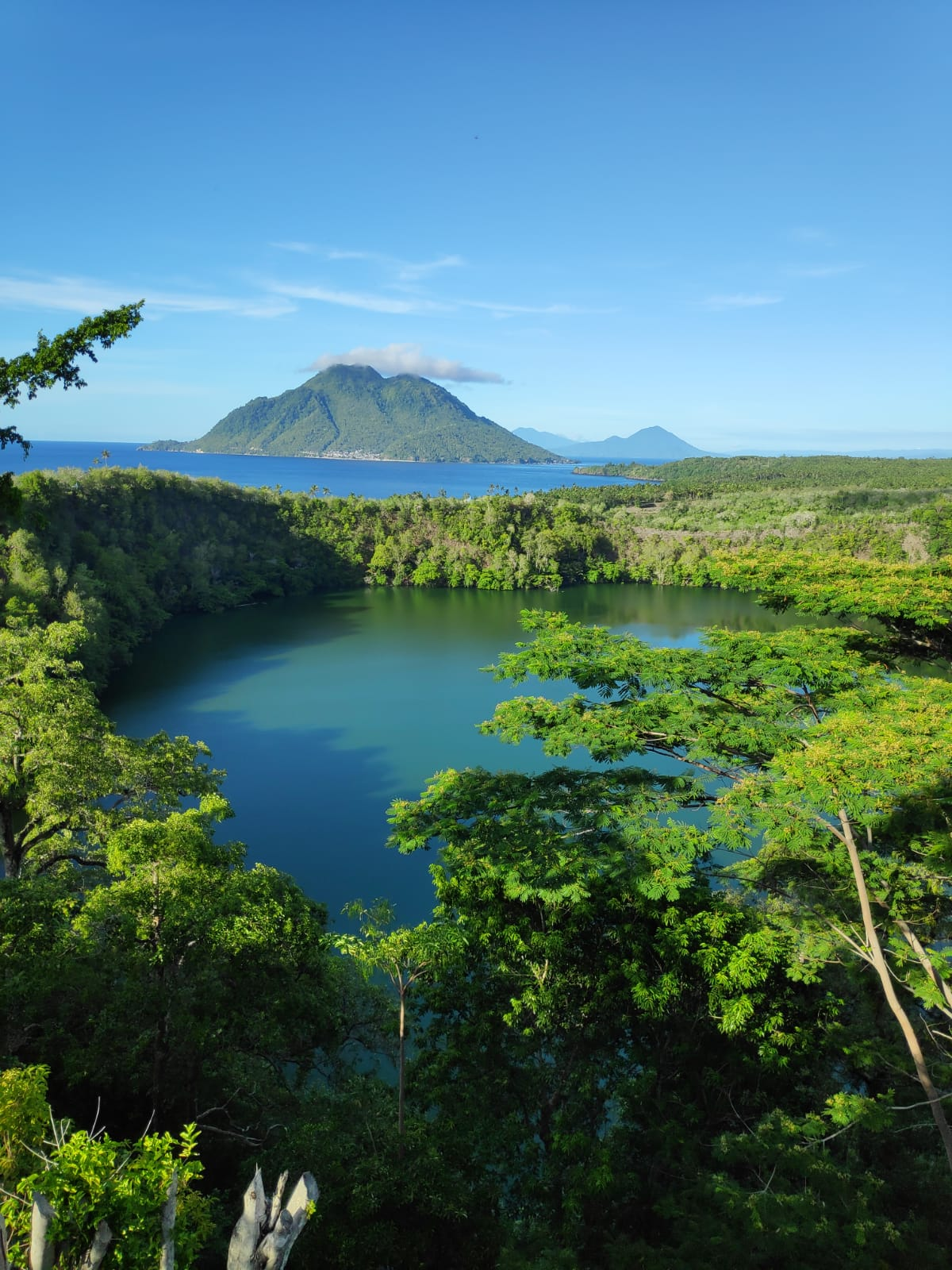
- Tolire Lake

- Location within Indonesia
- Location: Ternate, North Maluku, Indonesia
- Coordinates: 0.836°N 127.307°E
- Type: lake

Tolire Lake is located in northwest Ternate, North Maluku, Indonesia. The lake is bordered by sheer cliffs.

Tolire Lake at the foot of Mount Gamalama, the highest volcano in North Maluku. The lake itself is composed of two sections which locals call Tolire Large and Small Tolire. The distance between them is about 200 meters.

== Legend ==
Tolire Large and Small Tolire, according to local stories, was once a village where people lived in prosperity. This village was then cursed into a lake by a master of the universe, because one of the fathers in the village impregnated his own daughter. Great Tolire is believed to be the father and Small Tolire is believed to be a girl.
