= Aljufri Daud =

Indonesian footballer

Personal information
- Full name: Aljufri Daud
- Date of birth: 1 May 2000 (age 26)
- Place of birth: Ternate, Indonesia
- Height: 1.73 m (5 ft 8 in)
- Position: Full-back

Youth career
- 2016–2018: Borneo

Senior career*
| Years | Team | Apps | (Gls) |
| 2019–2021 | Borneo | 4 | (0) |
| 2022–2023 | Inter Banten | 2 | (0) |
| 2023–2024 | Perserang Serang | 8 | (0) |
| 2024–2026 | Persiba Balikpapan | 9 | (0) |
- * Club domestic league appearances and goals as of 12 January 2026

Aljufri Daud (born 1 May 2000) is an Indonesian professional footballer who plays as a full-back.

== Club career ==
=== Borneo ===
He made his professional debut in the Liga 1 on 18 September 2019, against Madura United where he played as a substitute.

== Career statistics ==
=== Club ===
As of 23 November 2025

| Club | Season | League | | | Cup | | Other | | Total | |
| Club | Season | Division | Apps | Goals | Apps | Goals | Apps | Goals | Apps | Goals |
|---|---|---|---|---|---|---|---|---|---|---|
| Borneo | 2019 | Liga 1 | 4 | 0 | 0 | 0 | 0 | 0 | 4 | 0 |
| Borneo | 2020 | Liga 1 | 0 | 0 | 0 | 0 | 0 | 0 | 0 | 0 |
| Inter Banten | 2022 | Liga 3 | 2 | 0 | 0 | 0 | 0 | 0 | 2 | 0 |
| Perserang Serang | 2023–24 | Liga 2 | 8 | 0 | 0 | 0 | 0 | 0 | 8 | 0 |
| Persiba Balikpapan | 2024–25 | Liga Nusantara | 5 | 0 | 0 | 0 | 0 | 0 | 5 | 0 |
| Persiba Balikpapan | 2025–26 | Championship | 2 | 0 | 0 | 0 | 0 | 0 | 2 | 0 |
| Career total | | | 21 | 0 | 0 | 0 | 0 | 0 | 21 | 0 |

== Honours ==
Persiba Balikpapan

- Liga Nusantara Promotion play-offs: 2024–25
