= Kastella =

Kastella may refer to:

- Kastella, Indonesia, a fortress in Indonesia also known as Fort Kastela
- Kastella, Greece, a hilly district of Piraeus also known as Munichia

== See also ==
- Kaštela, a suburb of Split, Croatia
