= Zamrony =

Indonesian footballer

Personal information
- Full name: Zamrony M. Dun
- Date of birth: 10 March 1988 (age 38)
- Place of birth: Ternate, Indonesia
- Height: 1.72 m (5 ft 8 in)
- Position: Defensive midfielder

Senior career*
Years	Team	Apps	(Gls)
2011–2013	PSPS Pekanbaru	9	(0)
2014	Barito Putera	0	(0)
2014–2015	PSPS Pekanbaru	7	(1)
2016–2017	Persiter Ternate	4	(1)
2018	PSPS Riau	12	(1)
2018–2021	Persiraja Banda Aceh	40	(5)
2021–2022	Persis Solo	0	(0)
2021	→ PSPS Riau (loan)	8	(0)
- * Club domestic league appearances and goals

Zamrony M. Dun (born 10 March 1988) is an Indonesian former footballer who plays as a defensive midfielder.

== Club career ==
=== PSPS Riau ===
He was signed for PSPS Riau to play in Liga 2 in the 2018 season.

=== Persiraja Banda Aceh ===
He was signed for Persiraja Banda Aceh to play in the middle season of Liga 2 in 2018.

=== Persis Solo ===
In 2021, Zamrony signed a contract with Indonesian Liga 2 club Persis Solo.

== Honours ==
=== Club ===
Persiraja Banda Aceh

- Liga 2 third place (play-offs): 2019
