= Ternate =

Largest city in North Maluku, Indonesia

- City
- City of Ternate; Kota Ternate
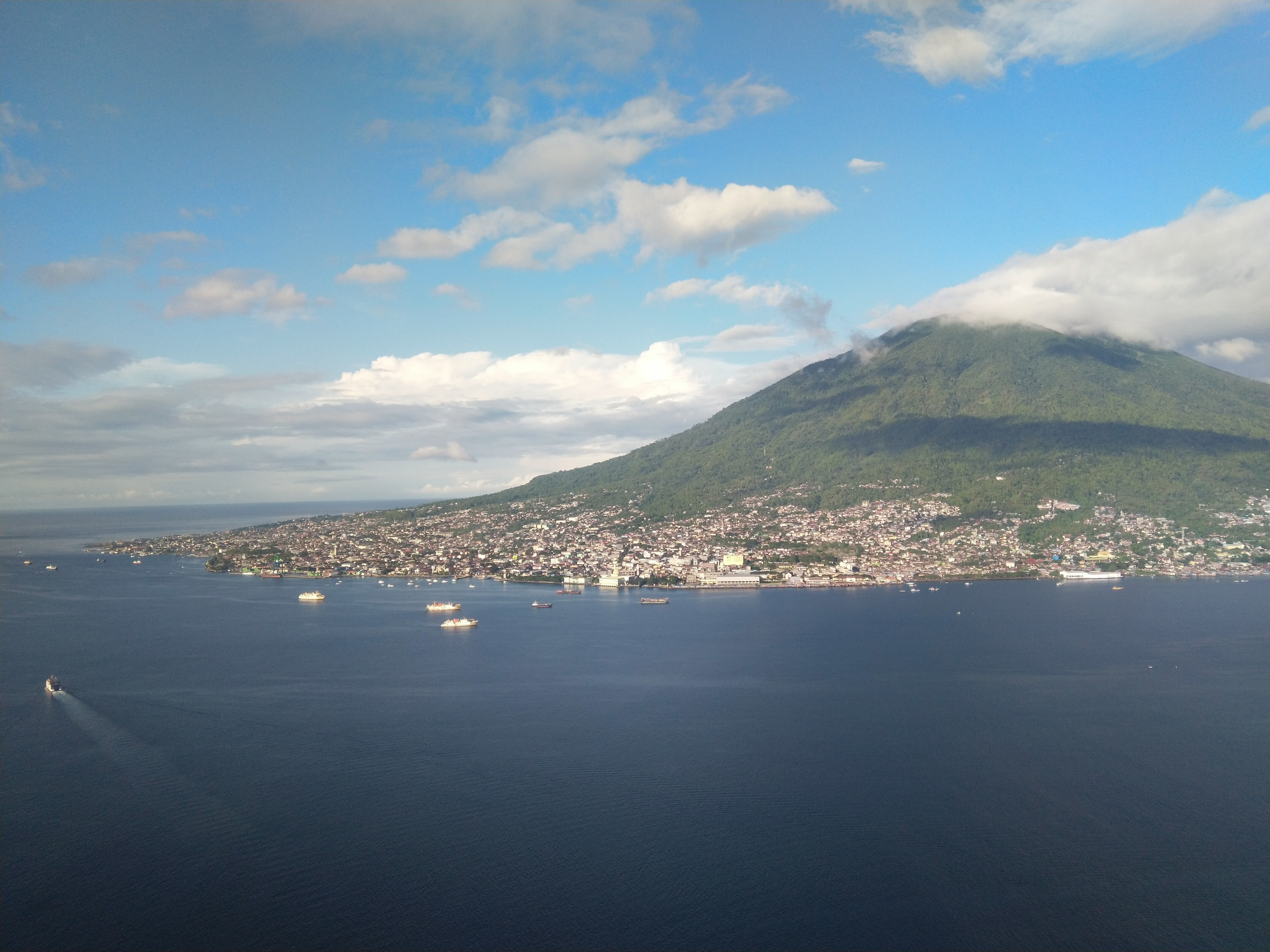
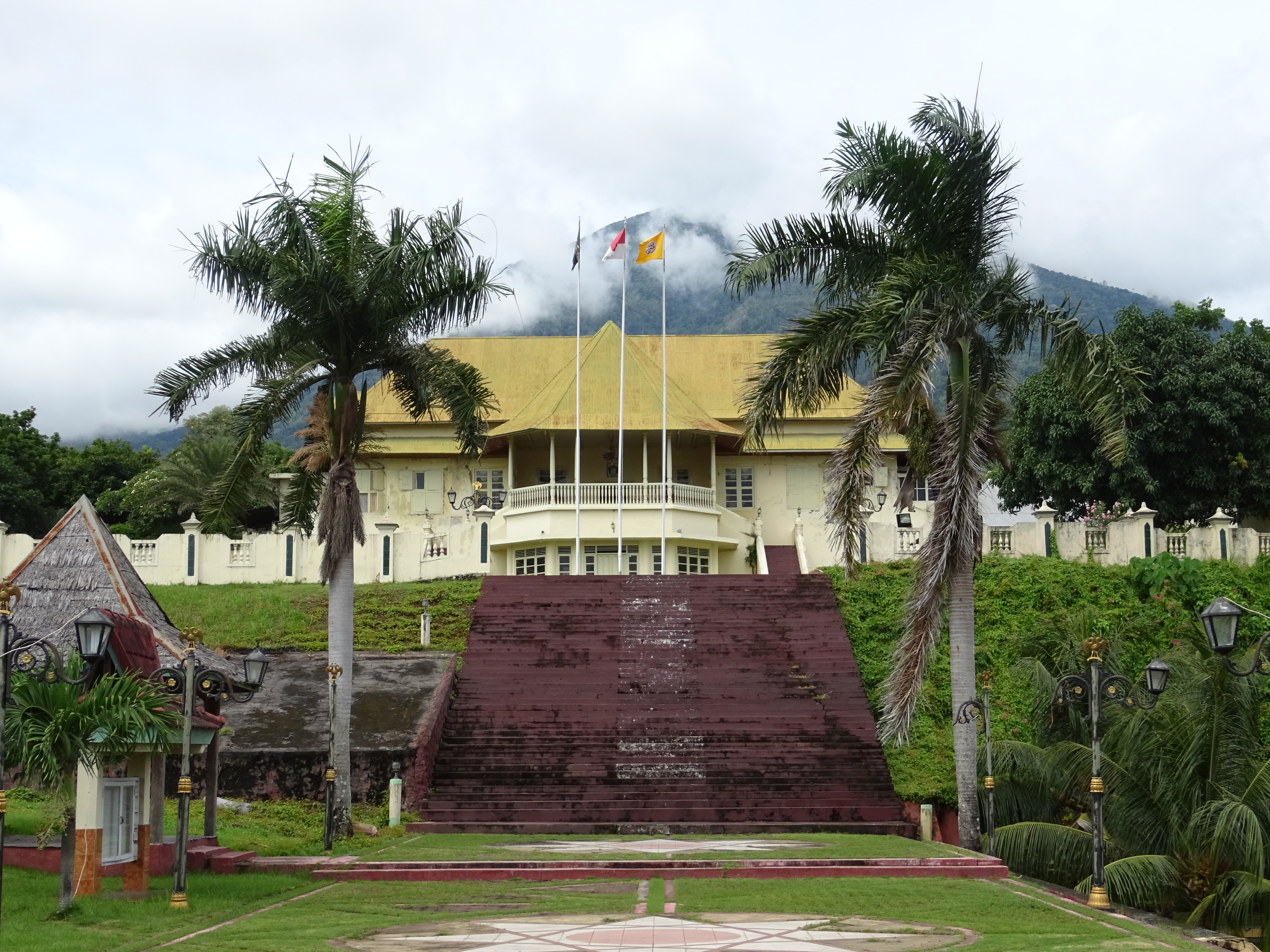
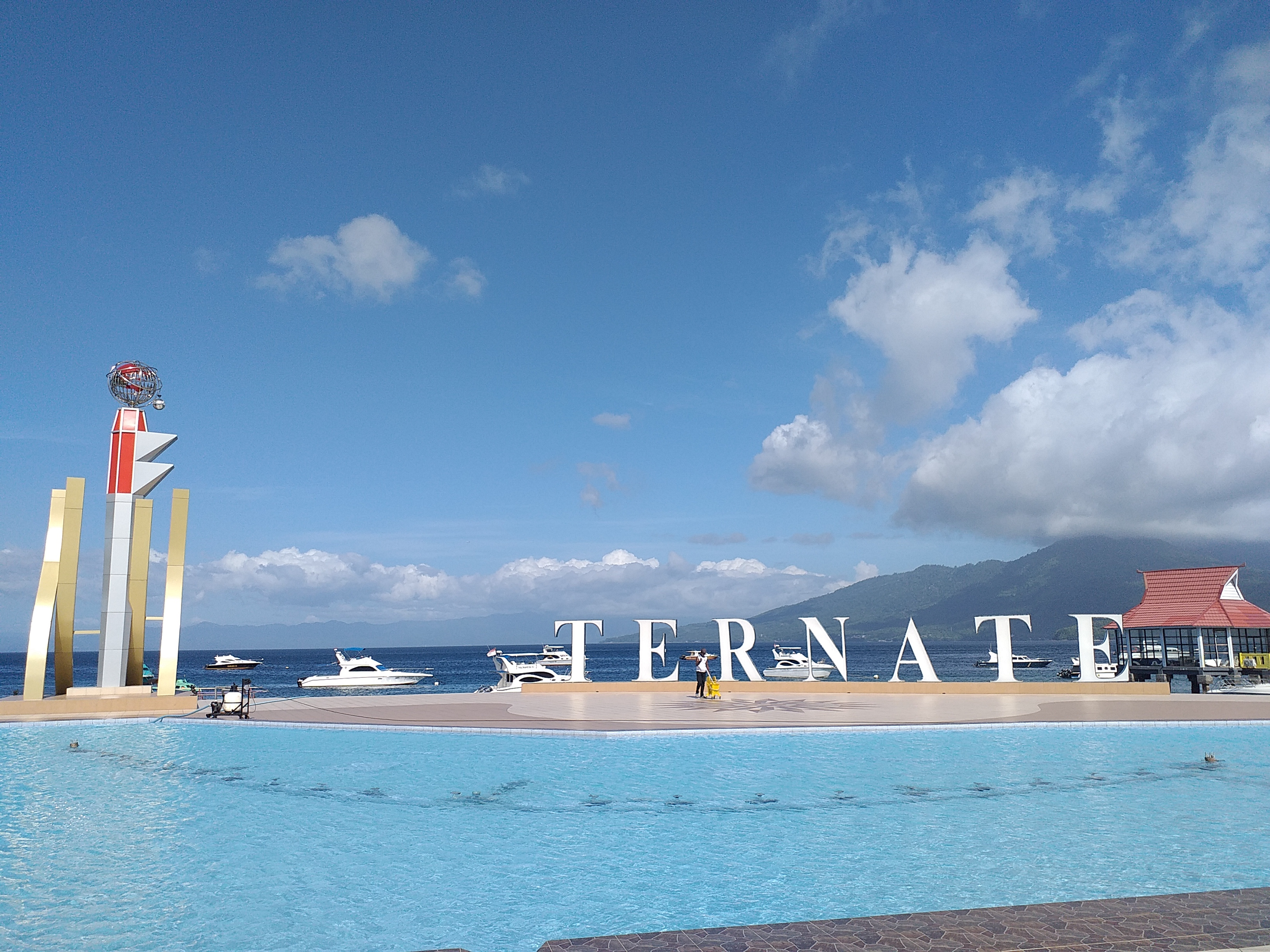
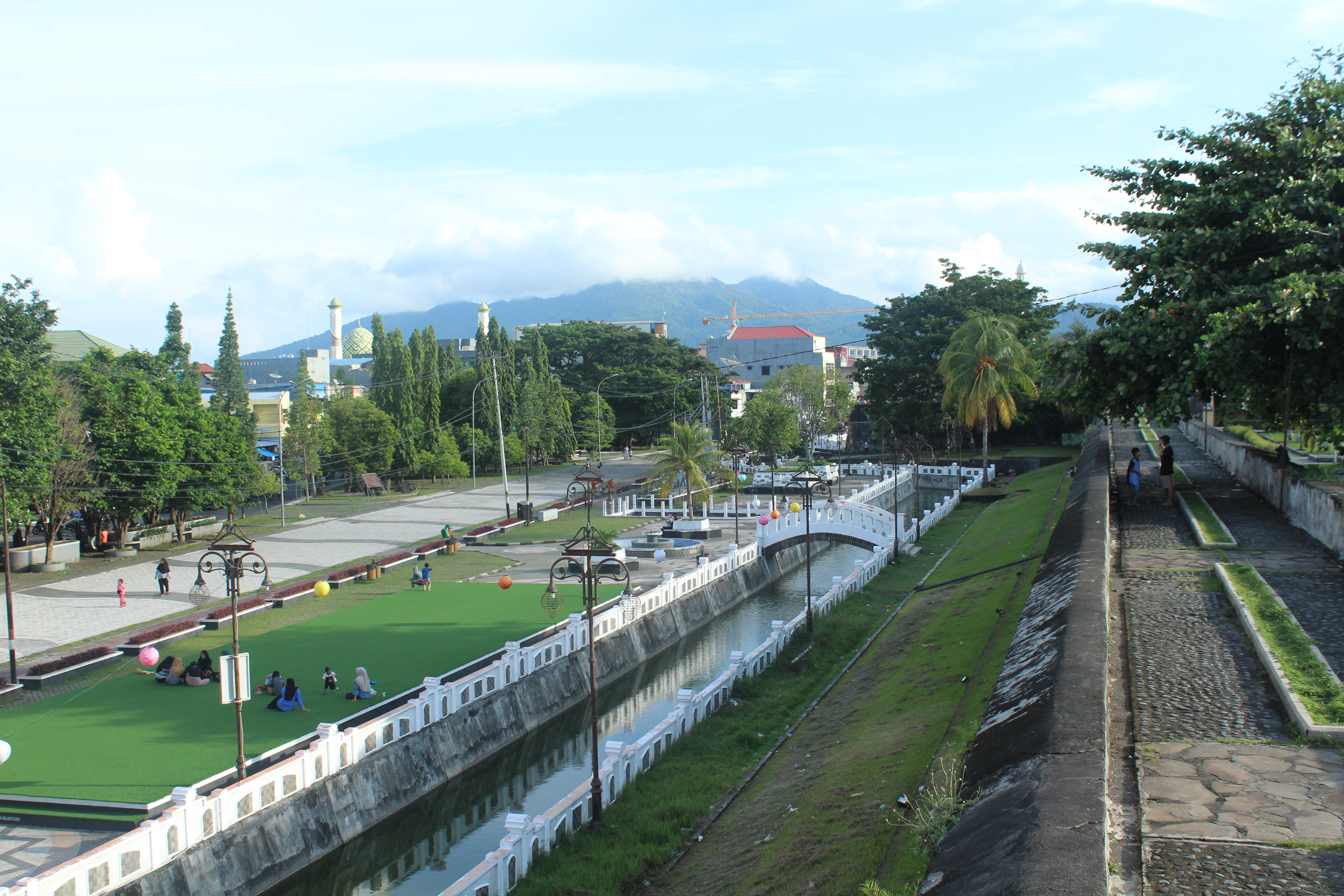
- Aerial view of Ternate Kedaton Sultanate of Ternate Landmark of Ternate Fort Oranje

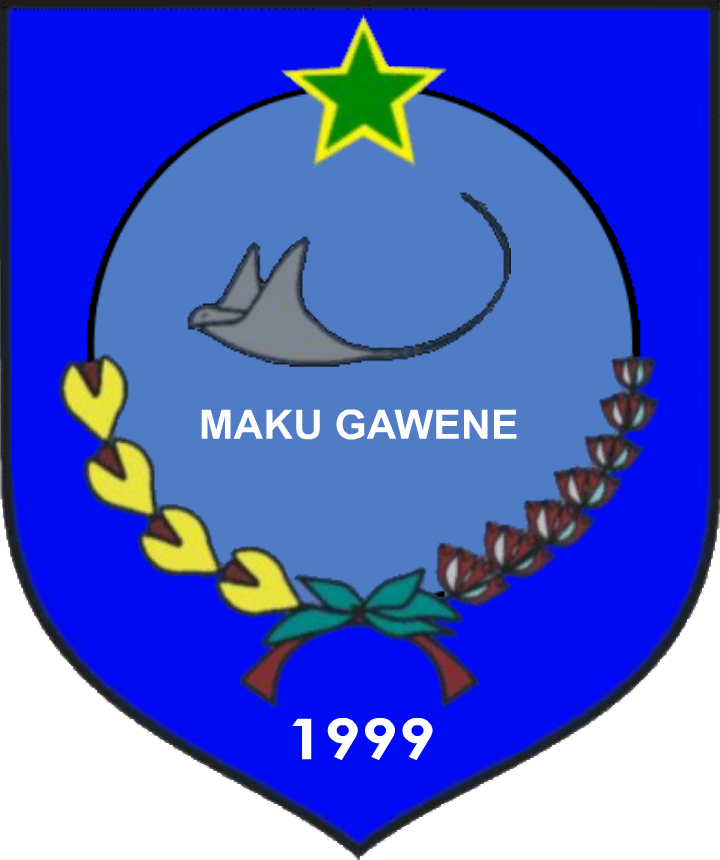
- Coat of arms
- Motto: Maku Gawene (Ternate) "Love Each Other"
- Location within Maluku Islands
- Interactive map of Ternate
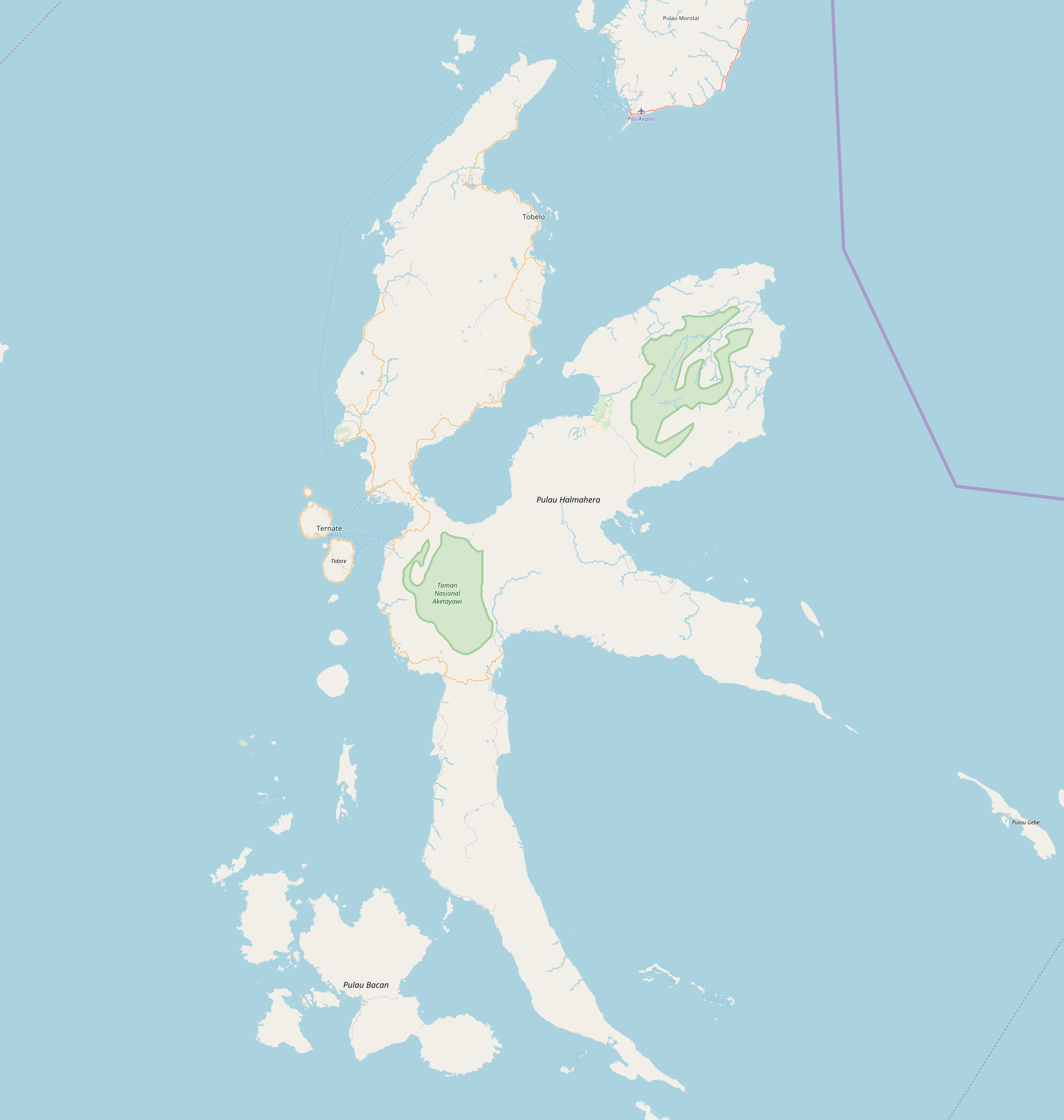
- Location in Halmahera and Indonesia Ternate (Indonesia)
- Coordinates: 0°46′48″N 127°22′55″E
- Country: Indonesia
- Province: North Maluku
- Settled: C. 13th century
- Established: 15 February 1523

Government
  - Mayor: Tauhid Suleiman (NasDem)
  - Vice Mayor: Nasri Abubakar
  - Legislature: Ternate City Regional House of Representatives

Area
  - Land: 162.20 km^{2} (62.63 sq mi)
  - Water: 5,547.55 km^{2} (2,141.92 sq mi)

Population (mid 2024 estimate)
  - Total: 210,836
  - Density: 1,300/km^{2} (3,400/sq mi)
- Time zone: UTC+9 (Indonesia Eastern Time)
- Area code: (+62) 921
- HDI: ▲0.800 (Very High)
- Website: www.ternatekota.go.id

Ternate (Indonesian pronunciation: [t̪ərˈnat̪e]) is the city with the largest population in the province of North Maluku and an island in the Maluku Islands, Indonesia. It was the de facto provincial capital of North Maluku before Sofifi on the nearby coast of Halmahera became the capital in 2010. It is off the west coast of Halmahera, and is composed of five islands: Ternate, the biggest and main island of the city, and Moti, Hiri, Tifure and Mayau (the latter two constitute the Batang Dua Islands, together with the small ofshore islets of Makka, Mano and Gurida). In total, the city has a land area of 162.20 square kilometres and had a total population of 185,705 according to the 2010 census, and 205,001 according to the 2020 census, with a density of 1,264 people per square kilometre; the official estimate as of mid-2024 was 210,836 (comprising 104,128 males and 100,792 females in 2023). It is the biggest and most densely populated city in the province, as well as the economic, cultural, and education center of North Maluku, and acts as a hub to neighbouring regions. It was the capital of the Sultanate of Ternate in the 15th and 16th centuries, and fought against the Sultanate of Tidore over control of the spice trade in the Moluccas before becoming a main interest to competing European powers.

== History ==
=== Early history ===
Maluku is mentioned in Nagarakretagama. The term originally denoted the spice-producing islands of North Maluku, of which Ternate became the dominant one. The Ternate Kingdom was previously known as the Kingdom of Gapi. Moluccan tradition says that there was an exodus of people moving out of Halmahera around 1250 due to political conflicts.^{:4} The settlement founded by people from Halmahera was first situated close on the hillside of the Gamalama mountain and named Tobona. During this time, Tobona was ruled by a tribal chief with the title of Momole.^{:4} This period was characterized by several smaller tribal settlements around Gamalama which were founded afterwards, such as Foramadiahi being established further downhill, while Sampalu, and Gamlamo were founded along the coast. These settlements also had their own Momole and were nominally independent from each other.^{:4}

In 1257, Tobona gathered all the Momole from other villages for a meeting, who all agreed to choose Cico, the chief of Sampalu village, as the collective ruler of Ternate. Cico may correspond to Kaicil Mashur Malamo, who was the first ruler according to other traditions and was a son of the Arab Jafar Sadik, who is claimed to be the father of the founding kings of Ternate, Tidore, Bacan and Jailolo. This political four-division had a great symbolic role. Cico replaced his title with Kolano, which means "king".^{:4} The capital of the kingdom was first in Sampalu village, but moved to Formadiahi during the reign of Kaicil Siale (1284–1298).^{:4} Under Kaicil Ngara Malamo (1304–1317), Ternate expanded its influence and conquered neighbouring islands.^{:5} Ngara Malamo was succeeded by Patsyarangan Malamo (1317–1322) and later Sidang Arif Malamo (1322–1331). During this time, Ternate started to interact with Chinese and Arab traders, especially from Malacca and Java. Ternate became a major port city and center of the spice trade in the Moluccas region, competing with its rival, Tidore. Some of the foreign traders eventually created the foundations of the Chinese and Arab communities in the city today.^{:5}

Around 1322, Arif Malamo initiated the Moti Agreement, which was a result of discussions between the rulers in Moluccas about trade and standardization of government structures. As a result of this agreement, the Moluccas had relatively peaceful times of over the next twenty years and trade flourished.^{:6} However, Arif was succeeded by Kaicil Tulu Malamo, who revoked the agreement as he thought it limited his expansionist ambitions. Ternate conquered neighbouring islands like the Sula Islands and Seram Island over the course of the 1400s.^{:6}

In the midst of this expansionist era, Ternate officially became an Islamic sultanate during the reign of Zainal Abidin (1468–1500) and supplemented the Kolano title with that of sultan. It was during this time that a period of Islamization began. Abidin also changed the traditional Moluccan government structure into a more Islamic one, including the foundation of the Jolabe, a council made up of Islamic clerics that would advise the sultan on religious matters. This structural and titular change was also adopted by Tidore and Bacan.^{:7}

=== Colonial era ===
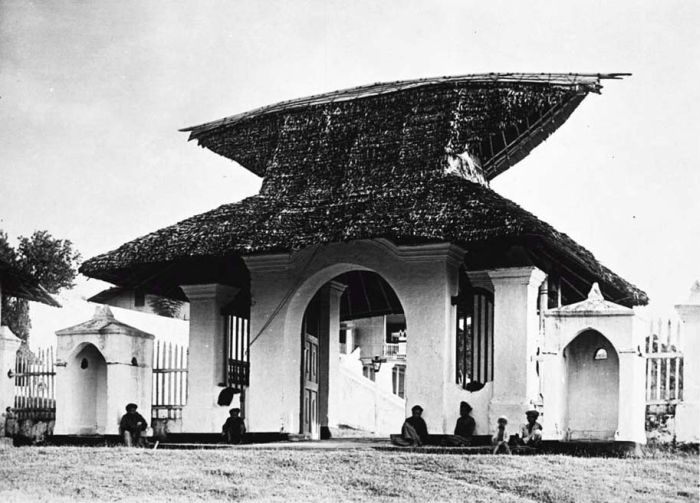
Gate of the palace of Ternate Sultanate.

Ternate and Tidore were the world's major producer of cloves, from which their rulers became among the wealthiest and most powerful sultans in the Indonesian region. Much of their wealth was used to fight each other. Until the Dutch completed the colonization of Maluku in the 19th century, the sultans of Ternate ruled an empire that periodically claimed at least nominal influence in magnitude as Ambon, Sulawesi, and Papua.

The peak of the Ternate sultanate's power came near the end of the 16th century under Sultan Baabullah, when it exerted influence over most of the eastern part of Sulawesi, the Ambon and Ceram area, the Banda Islands, Solor Islands, Mindanao, and parts of Papua. It engaged in a fierce competition for control of its periphery with Tidore. According to historian Leonard Andaya, Ternate's "dualistic" rivalry with Tidore was a dominant theme in the early history of the Maluku Islands.

As a result of its trade-dependent culture, Ternate was one of the earliest places in the region to which Islam spread, originating from Java in the late 15th century, though Islamic influence in the area can be traced further back to the late 14th century. The faith was restricted to Ternate's small ruling family before spreading to the rest of the population.

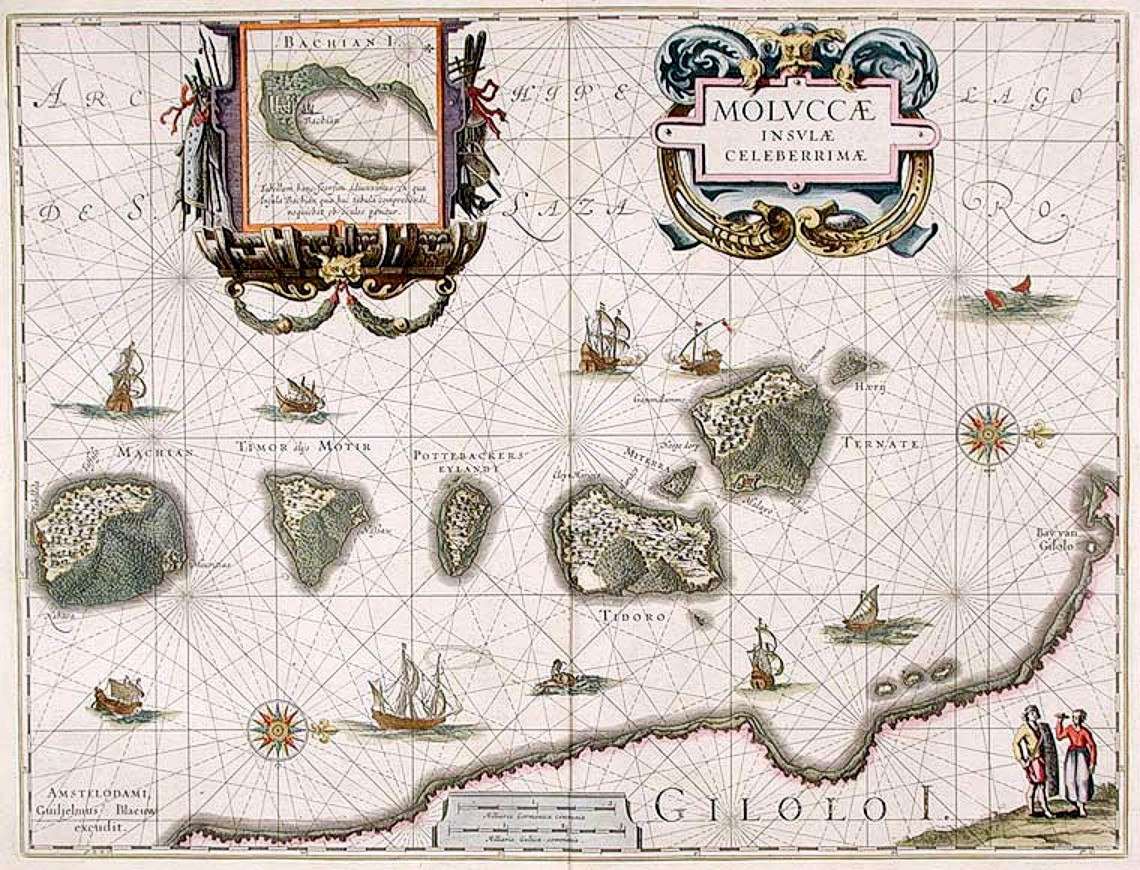
Early map of northern Maluku made during the Age of Discovery. North is on the right, with Ternate as the rightmost followed by Tidore, Mare, Moti and Makian islands. The bottom is the Gilolo (Jailolo or Halmahera) Island. The inset on the top is Bacan Island. Willem Blaeu, 1630

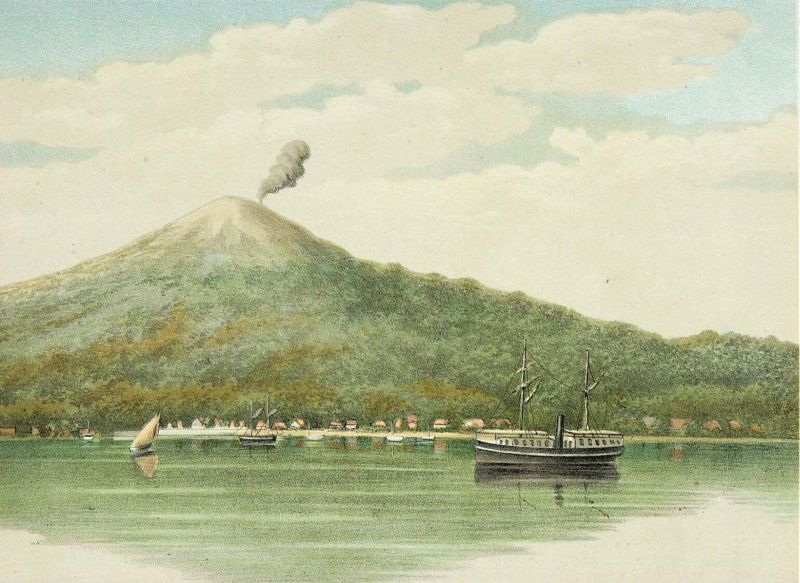
Colonial-era painting of Ternate island, c. 1883–1889.

The first Europeans to arrive at Ternate were part of the Portuguese expedition of Francisco Serrão coming from Malacca; they were shipwrecked near Ceram and rescued by local residents. Sultan Abu Lais of Ternate heard of their plight and brought them to Ternate in 1512 when he saw a chance to ally himself with a powerful foreign nation. The Portuguese were allowed to build Fort Kastela on the island.

Relations between the Ternateans and Portuguese were strained from the start; an outpost far from Europe generally only attracted the most desperate and avaricious figures. The poor behaviour of the Portuguese combined with feeble attempts at Christianisation strained relations with Ternate's Muslim ruler, as did their efforts to monopolise the spice trade and dominate local politics. In 1535 King Tabariji was deposed and sent to Goa by the Portuguese. He converted to Christianity and changed his name to Dom Manuel. After being declared innocent of the charges against him, he was sent back to reassume his throne, but died en route in Malacca in 1545, though he bequeathed Ambon to his Portuguese godfather Jordão de Freitas.

When Sultan Hairun was murdered and his head displayed on a pike in 1570, the Muslim Ternateans rebelled against the Portuguese who were besieged in their castle. Their captain was Dom Álvaro de Ataíde, and Belchior Vieira de Ternate distinguished himself in the defense until the garrison was forced to capitulate to Sultan Babullah in 1575, who made the castle his palace. Ambon and Tidore became the new centres for Portuguese activity in Maluku. European power in the region was weak and Ternate became an expanding, fiercely Islamic and anti-Portuguese state under the rule of Babullah (r. 1570–1583) and his son Sultan Saidi Berkat.

In 1579, the sultan entertained the English adventurer and circumnavigator Francis Drake, who had little interest in buying cloves, as his ship, the Golden Hind, was too full of gold that he had raided from Spanish treasure ships to carry cloves.

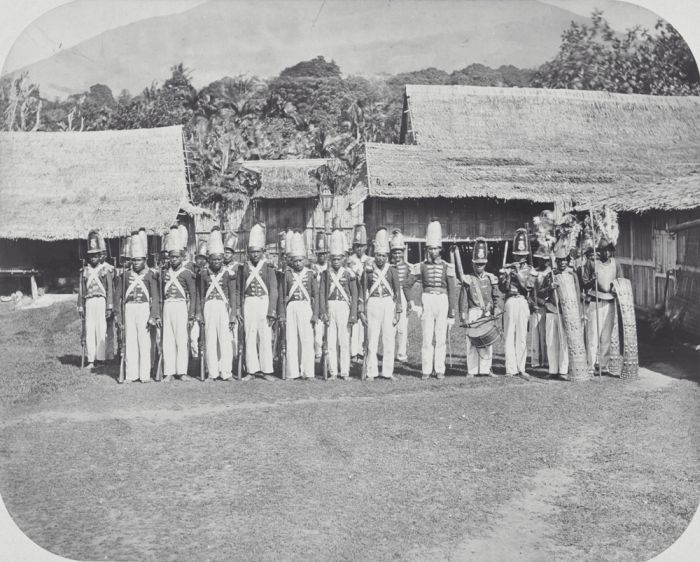
Sultan of Ternate's guard.

As the Portuguese battles in the Indian Ocean against Muslim powers continued, Ternate became a site of interest, particularly for the Ottomans, who had gained much information about maritime Southeast Asia from the Sultanate of Aceh. Kurtoğlu Hızır Reis, the Ottoman admiral, intended to reach both Java, Borneo and Ternate but was engaged in battle and outnumbered against the Portuguese fleet in Sumatra.

Spanish and Dutch traders competing for control over the lucrative clove trade were caught up in the competition between Ternate and Tidore. The Dutch eventually became the ruling power, though for a long time their influence was limited, and the sultanates are still in place today. Spanish forces captured the former Portuguese fort from the Ternateans in 1606 and deported the Ternate sultan and his entourage to Manila, a city which the Spanish captured from the Sultanate of Brunei by siding with the subjugated Kingdom of Tondo, the state which Manila displaced when Brunei invaded Luzon. The Spanish set up Manila as a captaincy-general under the Mexico-based Viceroyalty of New Spain, and Spanish Ternate in turn was ruled under the governor-general based in Manila. In 1607, the Dutch came back to Ternate and built a fort in Malayo with the locals' help. The Spaniards occupied the southern part of the island where they had their main settlement, Ciudad del Rosario. The island was divided between the two powers: the Spaniards were allied with Tidore and the Dutch with Ternate.

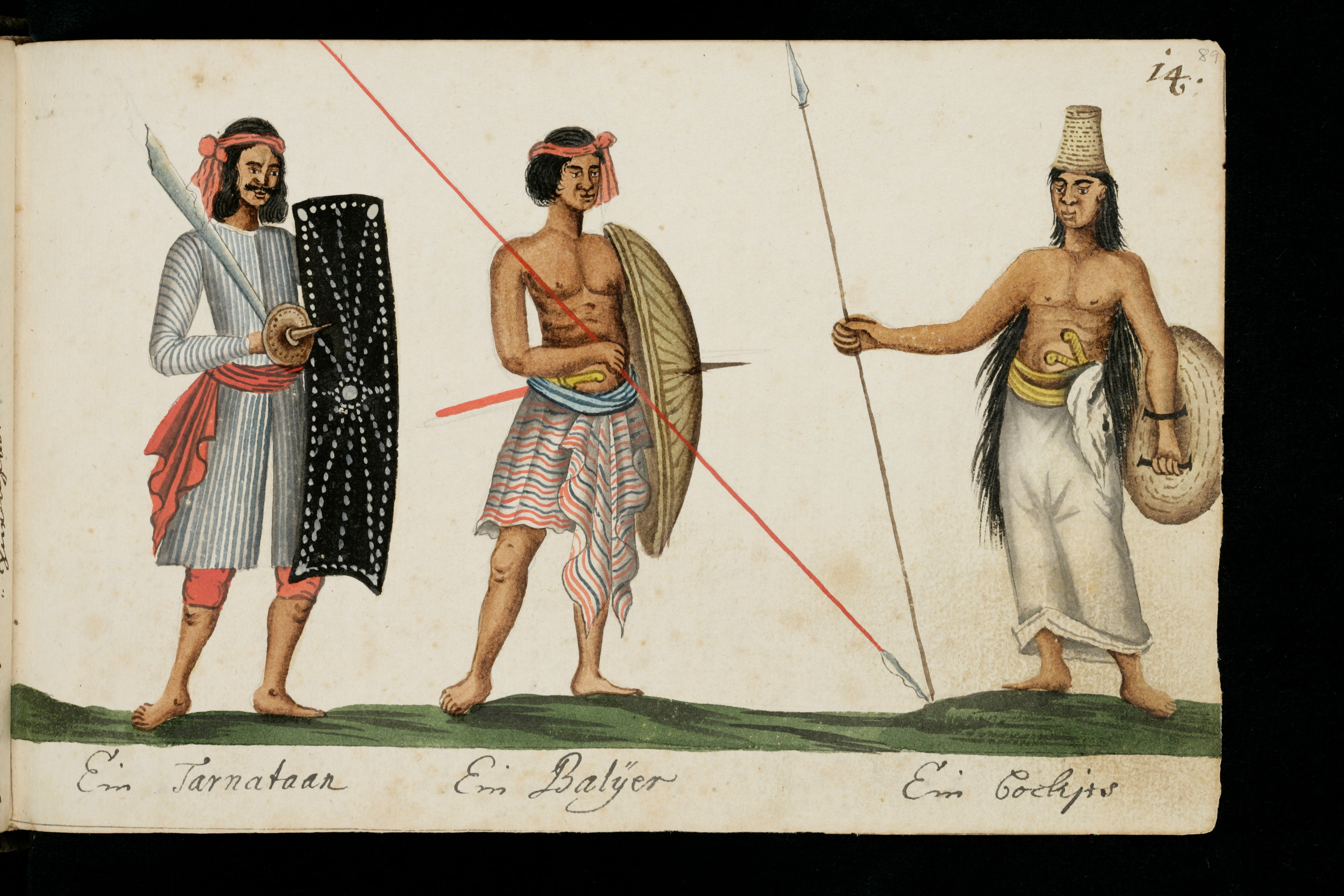
From left to right: Ternate, Bali and Bugis soldiers, European illustration from the 17th century

For the Ternatean rulers, the Dutch were a useful, if not particularly welcome, presence that gave them military advantages against Tidore and the Spanish. Ternate expanded its territory and strengthened its control over the periphery particularly under Hamzah's rule (r. 1627–1648). Dutch influence over the kingdom was limited, though Hamzah and his successor, Sultan Mandar Syah (r. 1648–1675) ceded some regions to the Dutch East India Company (VOC) in exchange for helping control rebellions. The Spanish abandoned Ternate and Tidore in 1663; when they abandoned Ternate, some of the people accompanied the Spanish in their retreat to the Philippines; about 200 families of mixed Mexican-Filipino-Spanish and Papuan-Indonesian-Portuguese descent left. In the Philippines, they settled in Ermita, Manila; San Roque, Cavite; Tanza, Cavite; and Ternate, Cavite, which they named after their homeland. Some mixed people chose to stay in Ternate, Indonesia, though they were persecuted and went through Islamization by a resurgent sultanate. In the 18th century, Ternate was the site of a VOC governorship, which attempted to control all trade in the northern Moluccas.

By the 19th century, the spice trade had declined substantially, and the region was less central to the Netherlands colonial state, but the Dutch maintained a presence in the region to prevent another colonial power from occupying it. After the VOC was nationalised by the Dutch government in 1800, Ternate became part of the government of the Moluccas (Gouvernement der Molukken). Ternate was captured and occupied by the British in 1810 before being returned to Dutch control in 1817. In 1824, it became the capital of a residency (administrative region) covering Halmahera, the entire west coast of New Guinea, and the central east coast of Sulawesi. By 1867 all of Dutch-occupied New Guinea had been added to the residency, but its region was gradually transferred to Ambon (Amboina) before being subsumed into it in 1922.

=== 20th century–present ===
Like the rest of Indonesia, Ternate was occupied by Japanese forces during World War II; eastern Indonesia was governed by the navy. After Japan surrendered in August 1945 and Indonesia declared independence, Ternate was reoccupied in early November 1945 by Allied forces who intended to return Indonesia to Dutch control. After World War 2, Ternate gained city status on 10 December 1946,^{:18} but was demoted to a district on 30 March 1965. It regained its city designation on 11 March 1981.^{:19} The sultanate still exists but with no power, and the titular rulers only act as cultural figures.

Ternate became part of Maluku when Indonesia became independent. There was some violence in Ternate during the 1998–2000 sectarian conflict across the Maluku islands. After the split of the new North Maluku province, it was assigned as the de facto capital of the province until 2010, when Sofifi was chosen. However, Sofifi still lacked infrastructure and city status, and today most activity in the province is still conducted in Ternate.

== Geography ==
Ternate lies in a very active seismic region where volcanic activity and earthquakes are common. Ternate belongs to a group of islands that make up part of the Ring of Fire. Ternate is dominated by the volcanic Mount Gamalama (1,715 m). An 1840 eruption destroyed most houses, and additional ones occurred in 1980, 1983, 1994 and 2011. During the 2011 eruption, Indonesia closed a domestic airport near the volcano for several days following ash emissions that reached 2,000 metres (6,600 feet) into the atmosphere.

Ternate
Native name: Pulau Ternate
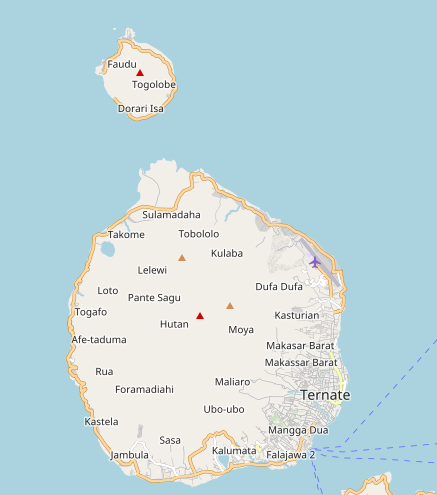
- Location map of villages on the island of Ternate

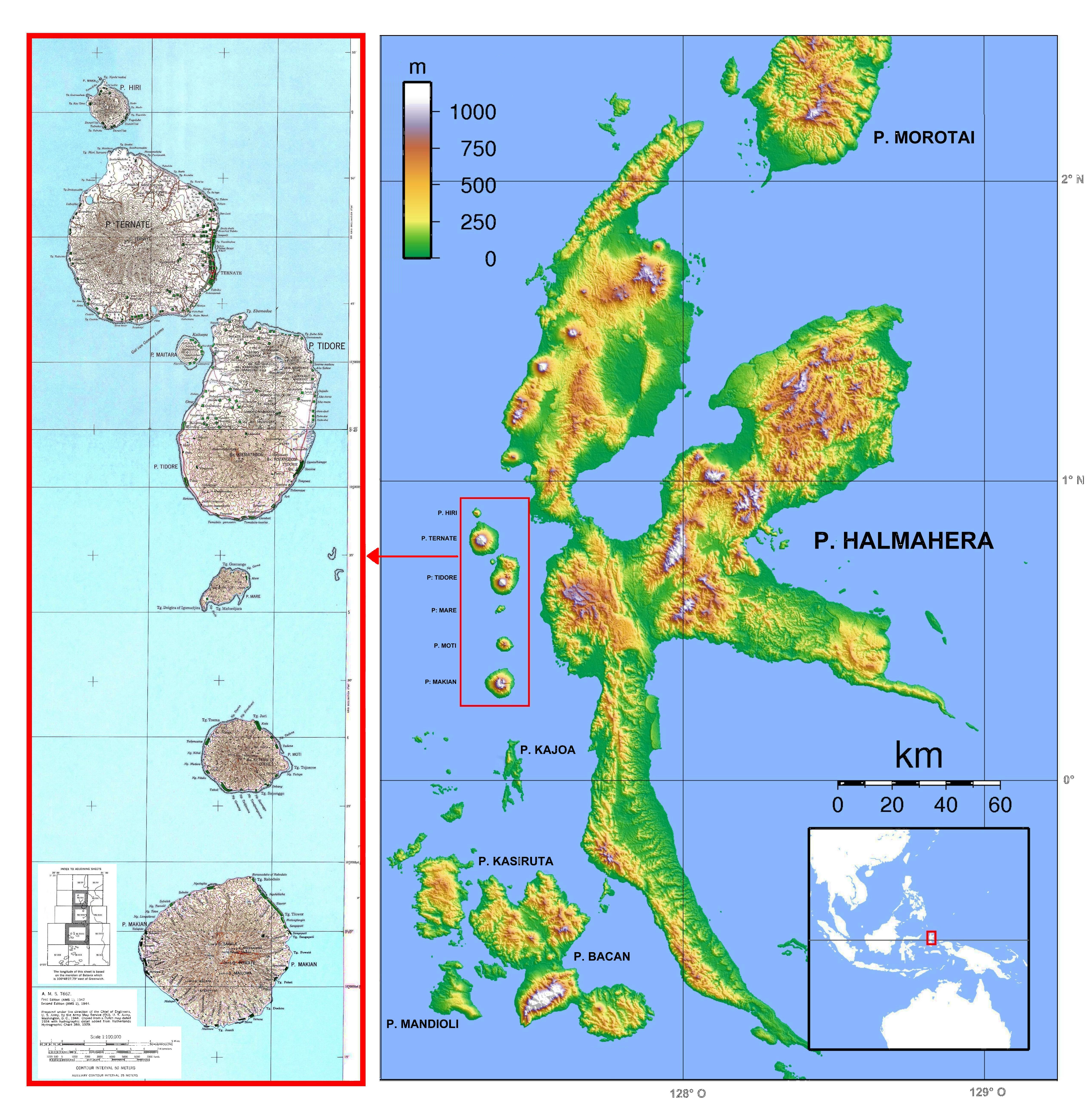
- Topographic map of the islands to the left shows (from north to south) the six volcanic islands of Hiri, Ternate, Tidore (with Maitara off its northwest coast), Mare, Moti and Makian; the map to the right shows their location within North Maluku

Geography
- Location: Pacific Ocean
- Coordinates: 0°48′N 127°20′E
- Archipelago: Maluku
- Area: 162.20 km^{2} (62.63 sq mi)
- Highest elevation: 5,627 ft (1715.1 m)
- Highest point: Gamalama

Administration
- Indonesia
- Province: North Maluku

Demographics
- Demonym: Ternateans
- Population: 201.244 (2021)
- Pop. density: 4,695,7/sq mi (18130.2/km^{2})

Additional information
- Time zone: IEST (UTC+09:00)

The foothills are home to groves of clove trees, and climbs to the peak of the volcano can be made. The airport lies along the northeast coastline. Hiri island is a stratovolcanic cone lying off the northern tip of Ternate. Moti Island is also a stratovolcano, and is situated between Tidore and Mare Islands to the north and Makian to the south. Crocodile-infested Tolire Lake lies in the northwest of Ternate island and is bordered by sheer cliffs. Ternate beaches include Sulamadaha in the north, Afetaduma and Jouburiki in the west, and the beach at the village of Kastela in the southeast.

=== Climate ===
Ternate has a tropical rainforest climate with heavy rainfall year-round.

Climate data for Ternate
Month	Jan	Feb	Mar	Apr	May	Jun	Jul	Aug	Sep	Oct	Nov	Dec	Year
Mean daily maximum °C (°F)	29.4 (84.9)	29.5 (85.1)	29.4 (84.9)	30.2 (86.4)	29.9 (85.8)	29.6 (85.3)	29.3 (84.7)	30.0 (86.0)	29.9 (85.8)	30.2 (86.4)	30.5 (86.9)	29.1 (84.4)	29.8 (85.6)
Daily mean °C (°F)	25.8 (78.4)	25.9 (78.6)	25.8 (78.4)	26.4 (79.5)	26.3 (79.3)	26.0 (78.8)	25.8 (78.4)	26.3 (79.3)	25.9 (78.6)	26.0 (78.8)	26.6 (79.9)	25.4 (77.7)	26.0 (78.8)
Mean daily minimum °C (°F)	22.2 (72.0)	22.3 (72.1)	22.3 (72.1)	22.6 (72.7)	22.7 (72.9)	22.5 (72.5)	22.3 (72.1)	22.6 (72.7)	21.9 (71.4)	21.9 (71.4)	22.7 (72.9)	21.8 (71.2)	22.3 (72.2)
Average rainfall mm (inches)	200 (7.9)	186 (7.3)	183 (7.2)	225 (8.9)	244 (9.6)	210 (8.3)	158 (6.2)	127 (5.0)	125 (4.9)	140 (5.5)	197 (7.8)	204 (8.0)	2,199 (86.6)
Source: Climate-Data.org

== Governance ==
=== Administration ===
At the time of the 2010 census, Ternate city (which includes seven neighbouring islands and islets as well as the main island of Ternate) was divided into seven districts, but in 2018 an eighth district (Ternate Barat) was created in the west of the island from part of the Pulau Ternate District. The districts are tabulated below with their areas (in square kilometres) and their populations during the 2010 and 2020 censuses, together with the official estimates as of mid-2024. Five of these districts are on the island of Ternate, and the remaining three each consist of a smaller neighbouring island or (in the case of Pulau Batang Dua District) islands. The table also includes the locations of the district administrative centres, the number of subdistricts in each district (all classed as urban kelurahan), and its post code.

Kode Wilayah	Name of district (kecamatan)	English version	Area in km^{2}	Pop'n 2010 Census	Pop'n 2020 Census	Pop'n mid 2024 Estimate	Admin centre	No. of subdistricts	Post code (on the left)
82.71.06	Ternate Tengah	Central Ternate	13.26	52,072	53,643	56,058	Salahuddin	15	97711 -97732
82.71.02	Kota Ternate Selatan	South Ternate	20.22	63,746	74,329	75,105	Kalumata	17	97713 -97734
82.71.03	Kota Ternate Utara	North Ternate	13.92	45,574	48,982	50,778	Dufa-Dufa	14	97723 -97738
82.71.01	Pulau Ternate ^{(a)}	Ternate island	17.39	14,692	8,735	9,233	Jambula	13	97747
	Ternate Barat ^{(b)}	West Ternate	33.88	^{(c)}	8,788	9,478	Sulamadaha	^{(c)}	97747
	Total island		98.67	176,084	194,477	200,652		59	
82.71.04	Moti ^{(d)}	Moti (Island)	24.78	4,399	4,811	4,615	Moti Kota	6	97741
82.71.05	Pulau Batang Dua ^{(e)}	Batang Dua Islands	29.03	2,487	2,791	2,711	Mayau	6	97743
82.71.07	Pulau Hiri	Hiri Island	9.72	2,735	2,922	2,858	Faudu	6	97745

Notes:

1. Pulau Ternate District consists of a reduced part of the western section of Ternate island.
2. The new Ternate Barat district includes the 22.05 km^{2} Hutan Lindung (protected forest) in the middle of the island and including the volcanic cone.
3. The figure is included in the previous figure for Pulau Ternate District.
4. Moti Island lies to the south of Ternate, between Tidore and Makian Islands.
5. This district actually comprises two widely-separated islands - Mayau (24.1 km^{2} with about 1,990 inhabitants) and Tifure (4.7 km^{2} with about 725 inhabitants), plus the uninhabited Gurida (0.224 km^{2}) off Tifure and the minor islets of Makka and Mano.

=== Local government ===
As with all Indonesian cities, the local government is a second-level administrative division run by a mayor and vice mayor with the city parliament, and it is equivalent to regency. Executive power lies with the mayor and vice mayor, while legislation duties are carried by local parliament. Mayor, vice mayor, and parliament members are democratically elected by people of the city in an election. Head of districts are appointed directly by city mayor with recommendation by the city secretary.

=== Politics ===
Ternate city is part of the First North Maluku electoral district with the West Halmahera Regency, both of which have 12 out of 45 seats in provincial parliament combined. At the city level, it is divided into four electoral districts, which has 30 representatives in total. The first electoral district consists of Central Ternate which has eight seats on city parliament, second electoral district with seven seats from North Ternate, third electoral district with 12 seats from South Ternate and Moti Island Districts, and the fourth electoral district with three seats from Ternate Island, Hiri Island, and Batang Dua Island Districts.

Electoral district	Region	Representatives
Ternate 1st	Central Ternate District	8
Ternate 2nd	North Ternate District	7
Ternate 3rd	South Ternate and Moti Island Districts	12
Ternate 4th	Ternate Island, Hiri Island, and Batang Dua Island Districts	3
Total		30

== Economy ==
The city's economy is diverse. Its gross regional product is dominated by service sector, such as trade and wholesale, which made 25.13% of the city's gross regional product in 2020. Other big sectors are the transportation sector with 13.13%, public administration and social security service with 19.15%, information and communication with 8.17%, and financial and insurance services with 7.31%. In contrast with neighbouring regions, it does not rely much on extraction or agriculture, with mining making only 0.08% of the city's gross regional product in 2020, and agriculture and fishing combined only 4.08%.

The fastest growing sector in 2020 was the administration service with a growth of 13.95% followed by communication and information with 10.46%. The transportation sector in 2020 was significantly affected by the COVID-19 pandemic and imposed restrictions, declining as much as 20.44%. Trading and manufacture sector also decreased 7.45% and 7.56%, respectively, in 2020. The city's GDRP per capita stood at 46.13 million rupiahs in 2019, and total nominal GDRP of the city in 2020 was 10.55 trillion rupiahs, an increase of 100 million rupiahs from the previous year. Economic growth in 2019 was 8.16% but later dropped to -0.85% in 2020.

Historically, the city and surrounding region were major producers of nutmeg in the world. As of 2020, 1,006 tons of nutmeg was harvested. Other agricultural products are clove with 330 tons, mango with 120 tons, tomato with 74.30 tons, and eggplant with 58.80 tons. The trading sector employed the most people in the city, with 12,683 working in 2020. Industries employed 5,068 people, and other service sectors employed 2,310 people. The total registered SMEs in the city number around 13,765 units with 21,723 employed people in the city. Most of the SMEs are engaged in commerce and trading sector. There are also 976 business entities registered in the city.

In 2020, there are total 73 hotel accommodations in the city, and 104 identified potential tourist spots according to Statistics Indonesia. In 2019, the city was visited by 1,501 international tourists and 208,871 domestic tourists. The city experienced an inflation of 2.13% in 2020.

== Demographics ==
Religion in Ternate (2023)
1. Islam (97.0%)
2. Protestantism (2.61%)
3. Roman Catholic (0.31%)
4. Hinduism (0.02%)
5. Buddhism (0.05%)
6. Confucianism (0.05%)
7. Folk religion and others (0.00%)

The most populous district is South Ternate with 74,960 people in 2022, while the least populous is Batang Dua Island District with 2,820 people. The sex ratio in the city in 2020 was 101 males per 100 females. As with most places in Indonesia, the population is relatively young with the group above 15 years numbering around 182,439 people. Population growth in 2019 was 2.21%.

Most inhabitants of Ternate are Muslim. There is also a small Protestant minority, mostly migrants from neighbouring regions. The indigenous inhabitants of Ternate speak the Ternate language, which is a non-Austronesian language that belongs to the North Halmahera family, which has been tentatively linked to the proposed West Papuan languages. Many inhabitants of Ternate use Ternatean as their first language and employ Ternate Malay as a means of interethnic or trade communication.

== Education ==
In 2020, the city had 114 kindergartens, 124 elementary schools, 43 junior high schools, 26 senior high schools, and 9 vocational high schools. All three public higher education institutions in North Maluku are located in Ternate. Khairun University is a public university in the province, located in South Ternate District. It is the main university of the province and accepts students from the national SNMPTN system. It was previously a private university, but was taken over by the Ministry of Education and Culture to serve as the public university of North Maluku in 2004. There is also the Ternate State Islamic Institute, which is also public, and Ternate Medical Polytech. Other private universities and institutions also exist, such as Muhammadiyah University, Wiratama Polytech of Science and Technology, Kie Raha Teaching and Education College, and Ternate Computer Academy. Aside from formal education, there are six registered Islamic boarding schools in the city as of 2021. Half of them are located in South Ternate District, while the rest are located in North Ternate and Central Ternate Districts. Due to numbers of higher education institutions in the city, it is also known as "Education City".

School participation rate is high: around 99.06% for children in the 15-year-old age group. Female student enrollment is higher than those of males as of 2020, reaching 100% as opposed to 98.05% on male students. Literacy rate was 99.68% as of 2020. Despite relatively developed infrastructure, schools in smaller islands, particularly such as those in the Moti and Hiri Districts, have fewer teachers in general compared to the mainland part of the city. The teacher-to-student ratio in the city is relatively lower compared to other parts of Indonesia: one teacher per 14 students.

== Healthcare ==
The city has total 5 hospitals, 5 polyclinics, 26 puskesmas, and 22 pharmacies as of 2020. Three out of five hospitals are located in the Central Ternate District, and there are 12 healthcare centers. The main public hospital in the city, Dr. H. Chasan Boesoirie Regional Hospital, is a public hospital owned by province government and classified as B-class by the Ministry of Health. Another public hospital was inaugurated in 2021, named Ternate City Regional Hospital, which is maintained by the city's government. There's also army hospital operated by the Indonesian Army. Other private hospitals are also present, such as Dharma Ibu Ternate General Hospital and Medika Harifalm General Hospital, both classified as D-class hospital.

Only 68% of city population has government-mandated healthcare insurance BPJS Kesehatan as of 2020, and major health problems in the city includes 27.59% of city population above 15 years old smoking an average 80 cigarettes per week. Toddler inoculation in the city for basic vaccines such as BCG and polio is relatively high, at 92.29% and 89.70%, respectively, while 91.02% of births in the city were assisted by professional healthcare workers. The city's population has a life expectancy of around 71 years, which is roughly similar to the national average.

== Culture and entertainment ==
=== Historical sites ===
The city houses historical forts built by both Europeans and the Ternate sultanate, such as Kalamata Fort, Kastela Fort, Oranje Fort, and Santo Pedro Fort. Fort Tolukko and Fort Kalamata were built by the Portuguese, while Fort Oranje was a temporary headquarters of Dutch East India Company. The palace of the Ternate sultanate still exists and currently functions as a museum. It is named Kedaton Sultan Ternate and is considered the national cultural heritage of Indonesia. Another historical building is the Ternate Sultanate Mosque.

=== Festivals ===
The city celebrates the kora-kora (traditional Moluccan boat) festival during their city anniversary, which is held in early December. It consists of a parade of decorated boats, a rowing competition, a fishing competition, and traditional art and dance shows. Another festival is the Legu Gam Festival, which is held to celebrate the sultan's birthday. During the festival, several traditional dances are performed in a parade. These festivals have been supported and promoted by the Ministry of Tourism.

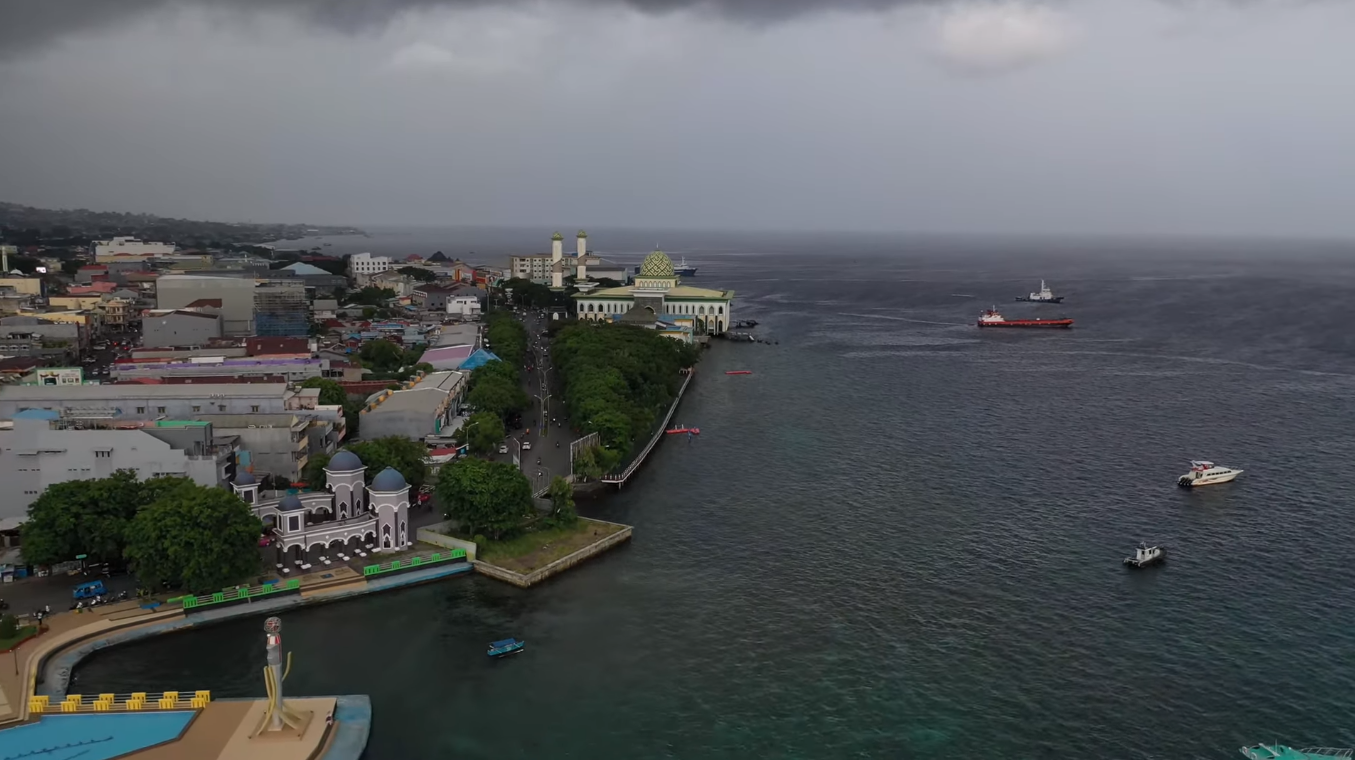
Ternate city from above, Nukila Park can be seen close to waterfront

=== City parks ===
There are several city parks in Ternate, such as Nukila Park. Another city park, Moya Park, located in the Moya subdistrict, was previously a dump site.

=== Others ===
The city has several shopping malls, such as Jatiland Mall, Hypermart Ternate, and Muara Mall.

== Transportation ==
There are 319 kilometers of road in the city, out of which 284 kilometers have been paved with hotmix asphalt. There are also 18 kilometers that have been paved with concrete instead. As Ternate is made of several islands, water transport is an important part of the city's transportation system. Goods transport is mostly done through Ahmad Yani Port; it is a relatively large port with a quay length of 167 meters and container yards totalling 1,889 hectares. The port is also served by routes operated by Pelni, and served 376,727 people out of the city in 2019. The city also has a separate port for fishing vessels, which can handle ships up to 2,250 gigatons. The city is served by Sultan Babullah Airport.

The city has angkots and online ride-hailing services such as Gojek.

== Media ==
There are nine media companies registered in Ternate according to the Press Council, both digital and printed. There are local television stations such as Gamalama TV, and also branches of nationwide private channels such as Trans TV Ternate Branch. Printed news media in the city include Malut Post, Fajar Malut, and Posko Malut. Radio Republik Indonesia also has a local branch in Ternate.

== Notable people ==
- Zamrony (born 1988) - footballer
- Aljufri Daud (born 2000) - footballer

== See also ==
- Ternate, Cavite, a municipality in the Philippines
- Pre-Islamic rulers of Ternate
- Sultanate of Ternate
