= Fort Kastela =

Fort Kastela Fortaleza de Ternate (Portuguese)
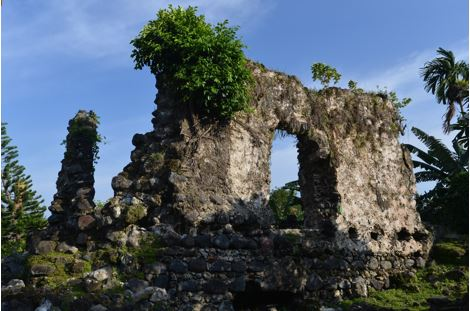
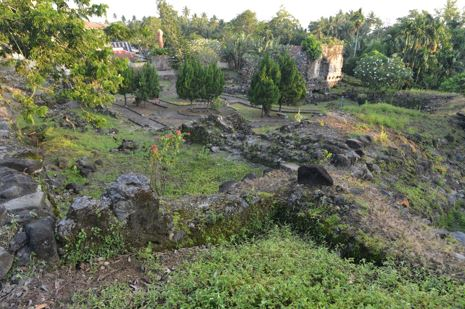
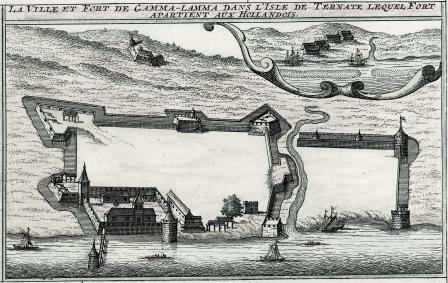
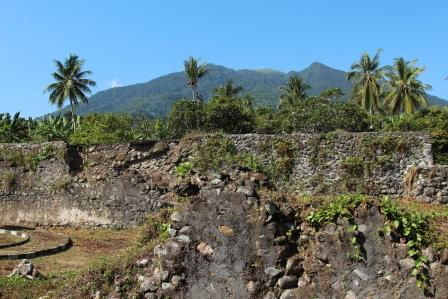
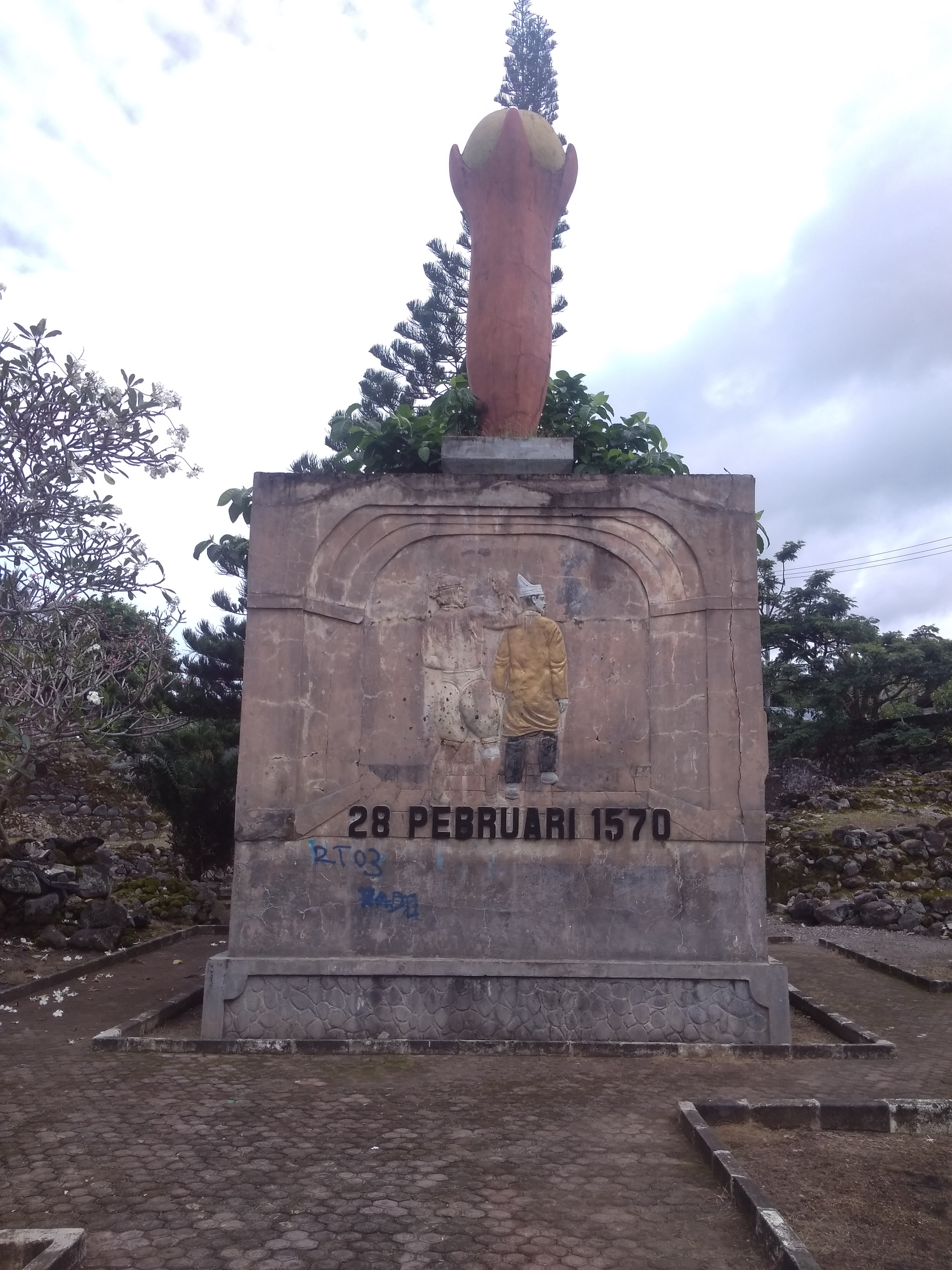
- Top, Middle, Bottom: Remaining ruins of the fort; 17th century image of Kastela; Fort ruins in front of Gamalama and Sultan Hairun monument.
- Interactive map of Fort Kastela; Fortaleza de Ternate (Portuguese)
- 00°45′39″N 127°18′43″E
- Location: Ternate, Maluku Islands, Indonesia

History
- Built: 1522 (finished on 15 February 1523)

Site notes
- Architectural style: Portuguese

Fort Kastela (Indonesian: Benteng Kastela) is a ruined Portuguese fortress located at the southwest coast of Ternate. It is famous for being the first colonial fortification constructed in the Spice Islands (Maluku) of Indonesia. Built by the Portuguese in 1522, it is also referred to in different languages as São João Baptista de Ternate or Fortaleza de Ternate (Portuguese), Ciudad del Rosario (Spanish) or Gammalamma (Ternatean and Dutch). Today it is locally known as Kastella, named after the Spanish region of Castile.

== History ==
In April 1521, a fleet was dispatched by King Manuel I of Portugal from Lisbon under the command of Jorge de Brito. The fleet was given orders to intercept the Spanish fleet of Ferdinand Magellan while sailing towards the Spice Islands from the Americas. Upon making landfall, they were ordered to construct a fortress on Ternate and to establish the Portuguese pre-eminence in the region.

=== Fort São João Baptista de Ternate ===
The initial fort was named by the Portuguese after Saint John the Baptist, on whose feast day the first stone was laid in 1522. It was completed in 15 February 1523. The location selected was on the south-west coast of Ternate, near the Sultan's Court, but 7 km from the island's main reef-free harbor at Talangame. São João Baptista commanded three narrow passages through the encircling reefs, which allowed small crafts to arrive for loading cloves, but prevented larger vessels from closing sufficiently to bombard.

Several subsequent visitors described the fort as incomplete, and it was not until the governorship of António Galvão, commencing in 1536, that the defenses were improved significantly. After killing Ternate's Sultan Hairun in 1570, the Portuguese were besieged in their fort by forces of the new Sultan Baab for five years. In 1575, they handed over the fort and retreated to Ambon.

=== Ternatean fort ===
Sultan Baab occupied the fort, renamed it as Gammalamma and converted it into his royal palace. Anticipating a Portuguese return, Sultan Baab extensively modified the defenses into a substantial fortress, and constructed an additional fort 5 km to the east, known today as Fort Kota Janji.

In 1605, the newly arrived Dutch VOC captured Portuguese forts on Ambon and Tidore and established a trading base on Ternate.

=== Spanish fort ===
The Spanish (in a personal union with Portugal since 1580) dispatched a strong expedition from the Philippines and recaptured Kastella, taking hostage Sultan Saidi Berkat and exiling him to Manila in March 1606. They further modified the Gammalamma defenses into a powerful fortress and renamed it as Ciudad del Rosario. Dutch Admiral Paulus van Caerden, captured by the Spanish in 1610 and held in Kastella, regarded it as "invulnerable."

It was the Spanish capital of the Moluccas between 1606 and 1663, a large city that housed several churches, a Franciscan monastery and a hospital. When the Spanish departed from the Spice Islands in 1663, they partially destroyed the defenses which were then occupied by the Dutch.

Today the site consists of ruins spread over a large area, scattered with local houses and bisected by the main island road. There is a monument for the 1575 Ternatean victory over the Portuguese, and sections of the old walls and bastions from the Spanish period can also be seen.

== Commanders of the fort ==
=== Portuguese ===
- Captain António de Brito 1522–1526
- Captain Garcia Henriques 1526–1527
- Captain Jorge de Menezes 1527–1530
- Captain Gonçalo Pereira 1530–1531
- Captain Luís de Andrade 1531
- Captain Vicente da Fonseca 1531–1533
- Captain Tristão de Ataíde 1533–1536
- Captain António Galvão 1536–1539
- Captain Jorge de Castro 1539–1544
- Captain Jordão de Freitas 1544–1546
- Captain Bernardim de Sousa 1546–1549
- Captain Baltazar Veloso 1549
- Captain Cristóvão de Sá 1549–1550
- Captain Bernardim de Sousa 1550–1552
- Captain Cristóvão de Sá 1552–1555
- Captain Duarte de Eça 1555–1558
- Captain António Pereira Brandão 1558–1560
- Captain Manuel de Vasconcelos 1560–1561
- Captain Sebastião Machado 1561
- Captain Henrique de Sá 1562–1564
- Captain Álvaro de Mendonça 1564–1566
- Captain Diogo Lopes de Mesquita de Lima 1567–1570
- Captain Álvaro de Ataíde 1567–1570
- Captain Nuno Pereira de Lacerda 1570-1575

== See also ==
- Fort Kalamata
- Fort Tolukko
- Otanaha Fortress
