= KS Inter Banten =

Indonesian football club

- Full name: Klub Sepakbola Internasional Banten
- Nickname(s): The Panthers
- Founded: 30 May 2022; 2 years ago
- Ground: Banten International Stadium
- Capacity: 38,000
- Owner: PSSI Serang City
- Manager: Dyaradzi Aufa
- Coach: Boni Safrudin Wijaya
- League: Liga 4
Home colours	Away colours

Klub Sepakbola Internasional Banten (simply known as Inter Banten) is an Indonesian football club based in Serang, Banten. They were scheduled to first competed in the 2022–23 Liga 3 but it was cancelled. They currently compete in Liga 4 Banten zone.

== History ==
Initially, this club was named Internazionale Banten and was confirmed as a member of PSSI (FA Indonesia) on 30 May 2022. However, the club changed its name because they were worried about being sued by the Italian club, Internazionale Milan and they finally realized that the word "Internazionale" also needed permission from the Internazionale Milan. Therefore, they apologized to Internazionale Milan supporters. In addition, the club also guaranteed to take care of the name change from Internazionale Banten to Internasional Banten or Inter Banten.
