= Gamalama =

Volcano on Ternate, Indonesia

- Pulau Ternate
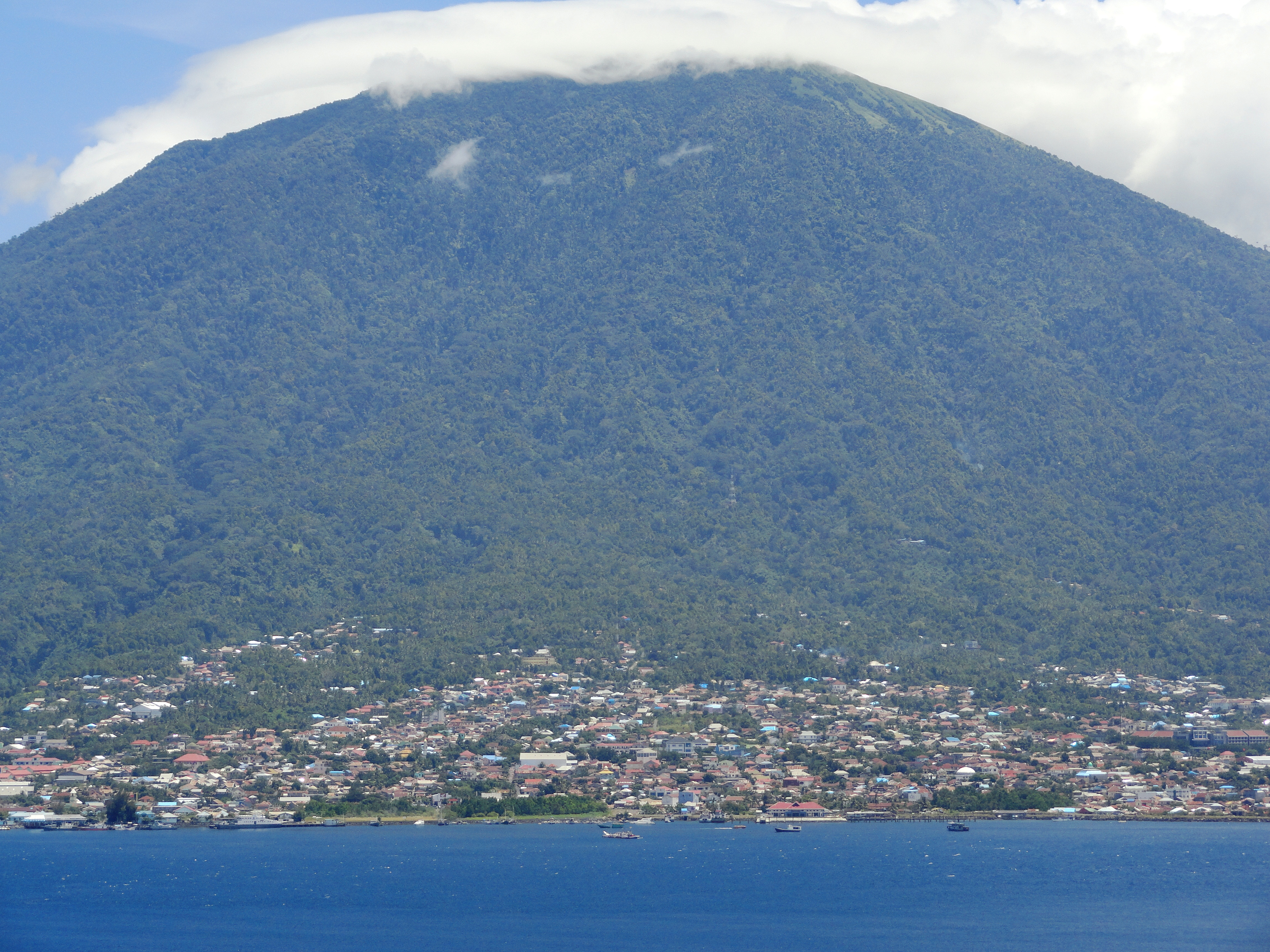

Highest point
- Elevation: 1,715 m (5,627 ft)
- Prominence: 1,715 m (5,627 ft)
- Listing: Ultra; Ribu
- Coordinates: 00°48′33″N 127°20′00″E

Geography
- Location within Indonesia
- Location: Ternate, Maluku Islands, Indonesia

Geology
- Mountain type: Stratovolcano
- Last eruption: 2022 (ongoing)

Gamalama is a near-conical active stratovolcano that comprises the entire Ternate island in Indonesia. The island lies off the western shore of Halmahera island in the north of the Maluku Islands. For centuries, Ternate was a center of Portuguese and Dutch forts for spice trade, which have accounted for thorough reports of Gamalama's volcanic activities.

== Geology ==
Mount Gamalama is one of the most active volcanoes in Indonesia. Between 1550 and 2015, 77 different eruptions have been documented. The 2015 eruption gave very short precursor signs (less than 24 hours). Eruptions range from basaltic effusive lava flows to more violent andesitic eruptions that are characterized with large and dangerous pyroclastic flows.

An eruption in 1775 caused the deaths of approximately 1300 people.

On December 4, 2011 Mount Gamalama erupted, ejecting material up to 2,000 meters into the air. Thousands of residents in nearby Ternate City fled due to ash and dust particles raining down on the town. Finally on December 27 some 4 people died and dozens injured from debris falls (lahar) after a month of activity.

More eruptions occurred in September 2012.

An eruption on December 18, 2014, deposited five centimeters of ash on the runway of Babullah Airport in Ternate, closing the airport.

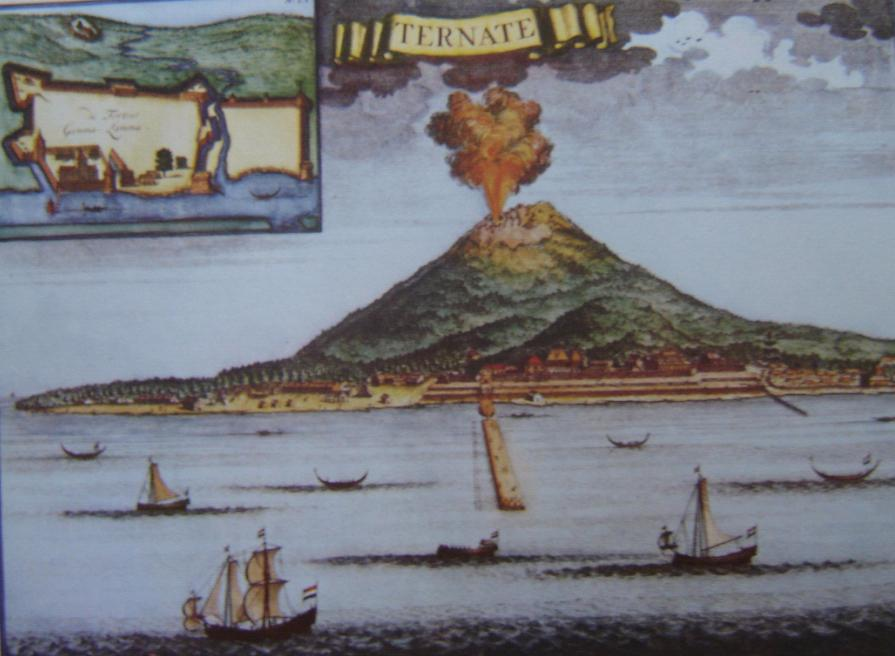
Depiction of Gamalama erupting in the early 1700s with a Portuguese fort shown.

== See also ==
- List of volcanoes in Indonesia
- List of ultras of the Malay Archipelago
