= Saifuddin of Tidore =

Saifuddin
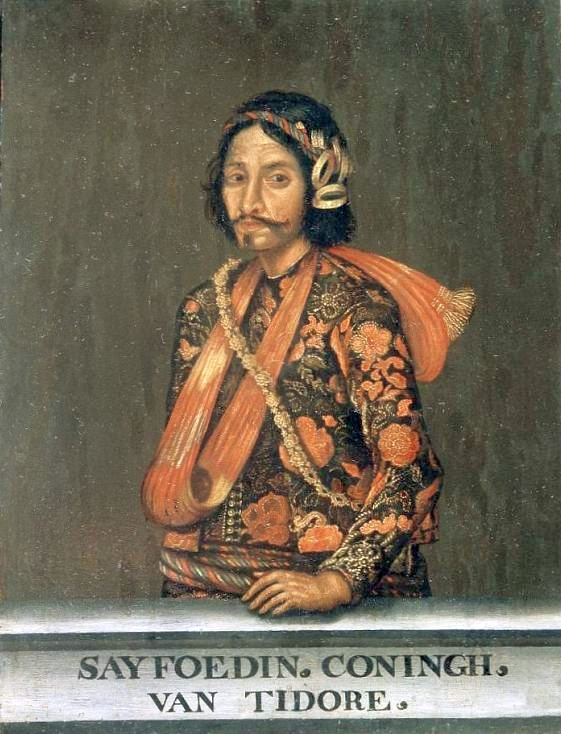

Sultan of Tidore
- Reign: 1657–1687
- Predecessor: Saidi
- Successor: Hamza Faharuddin
- Died: 2 October 1687
- Father: Gorontalo of Tidore
- Religion: Islam

Sultan Saifuddin (Jawi: سلطان سيف الدين), also known as Golofino (died 2 October 1687) was the eleventh Sultan of Tidore in Maluku Islands. Reigning from 1657 to 1687, he left Tidore's old alliance with the Spanish Empire and made treaties with the Dutch East India Company (VOC), which now became hegemonic in Maluku for the next century. Tidore was forced to extirpate the clove trees in its territory and thus ceased to be a spice Sultanate. In spite of this, Saifuddin and his successors were able to preserve a degree of independence due to the trade in products from the Papuan Islands and New Guinea.

== Early years, exile and comeback ==
Kaicili (prince) Golofino was a son of Sultan Gorontalo of Tidore. Although he had a brother Kaicili Gorian (Goranja) who was his senior, he stands out as the active representative of this branch of the royal family. When his father was murdered by the Spanish authorities in 1639 for treasonous conduct, Golofino tried to be acknowledged, opposing the Spanish candidate Saidi. However, he had to give up the attempt in 1640 and sought refuge in the Sultanate of Ternate, which was closely allied with the VOC. The Dutch tried to impose a monopoly on the spice trade after 1652 by forcing dependent territories to extirpate clove trees outside the Ambon Quarter. Since Tidore produced large amounts of cloves and was formally a vassal under the King of Spain the monopoly was still imperfect, and a VOC-Tidore war in 1653-1654 was inconclusive. In January 1657, however, Sultan Saidi died and his son Kaicili Weda prepared to succeed him. Now the Governor of Ternate, Simon Cos, and the Ternatan Sultan Mandar Syah brought forward Golofino as candidate, assisting his party with munitions and soldiers. Golofino soon gained the upper hand and was enthroned as the new Sultan of Tidore under the name Saifuddin. With this event, the long-standing rivalry between the two branches of the Tidore dynasty came to an end.

== VOC monopoly and Spanish withdrawal ==
The Spanish, who held a number of fortresses in Tidore Island and southern Ternate Island, were infuriated by the intervention of the VOC in a time of official peace, and vowed to strike back. However, their position was too precarious to undertake anything against Saifuddin or the VOC. In fact, the Spanish garrison found themselves under siege during 1657-1658 and suffered badly from shortage of food. At his accession, Saifuddin made a treaty with the Company where he promised to eradicate the spice trees in his realm, something that he actually took care to carry out. The new Sultan also took care to eliminate potential opponents. This included the jojau (first minister) who supposedly colluded with the Spanish to get rid of Saifuddin, and the kapita laut (sea lord) who was accused of witchcraft.

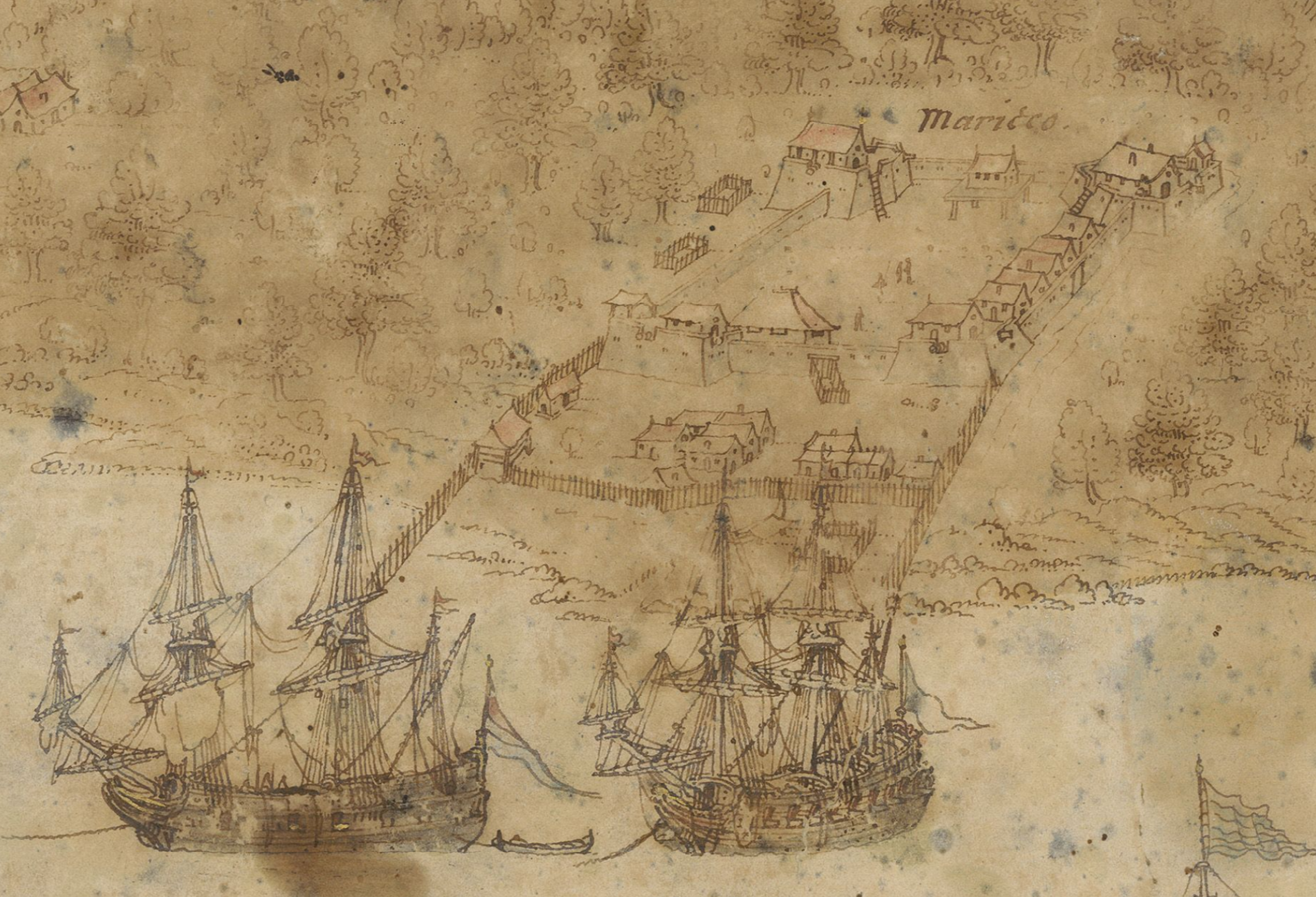
Fort Marieko on Tidore, image by Johannes Vingboons (between 1660-1667)

In the meantime the Spanish authorities in the Philippines found that they had limited use of the possessions in Maluku. The economic advantages were small and there was no opportunity to disseminate the Catholic creed in the lands of the staunchly Islamic Sultan of Tidore. This was coupled with administrative mismanagement where the captains wielded arbitrary power that caused many desertions of Spanish soldiers to the Dutch. In 1662, finally, the Governor in Manila decided to withdraw the garrisons from Ternate and Tidore. The soldiers were needed closer at home in case the Chinese-Japanese pirate lord Koxinga invaded the Spanish Philippines. The withdrawal took place in 1663, but the fortifications were dismantled in 1666. Ten fortresses were razed together with churches and other buildings. The Spanish captain-general left a note to the VOC governor where he asserted that King Charles II of Spain still kept "dominion and overlordship" over Maluku, though this turned out to be a vain gesture.

== Formal rights to Papua ==
With the coming of a VOC-friendly Sultan, the Dutch found the time ripe to arrange a treaty between the three North Malukan Sultanates, Tidore, Ternate and Bacan in 1660. In theory, this ended the centuries-long rivalry between Tidore and Ternate, though it would soon reappear. In the treaty the vassals of the Sultans were laid down. Under Tidore were places at or adjacent to Halmahera, namely Toniu, Kayassa, Yodi, Sasi, Maidi, Waunua, Goroa, Toia, Weda, Maba, Saffora, and Morotai, as well as the lands of the Papuans, "or all their islands". The Dutch thus legally acknowledged Tidorese rule in the New Guinea quarters, though they had little concrete knowledge of conditions there. Not even Saifuddin himself seems to have had a very clear idea how far his territory in New Guinea extended. This was complemented by another treaty in 1667 that reaffirmed the close alliance with the VOC and granted the Tidorese the exclusive rights to sail to the waters of Papua.

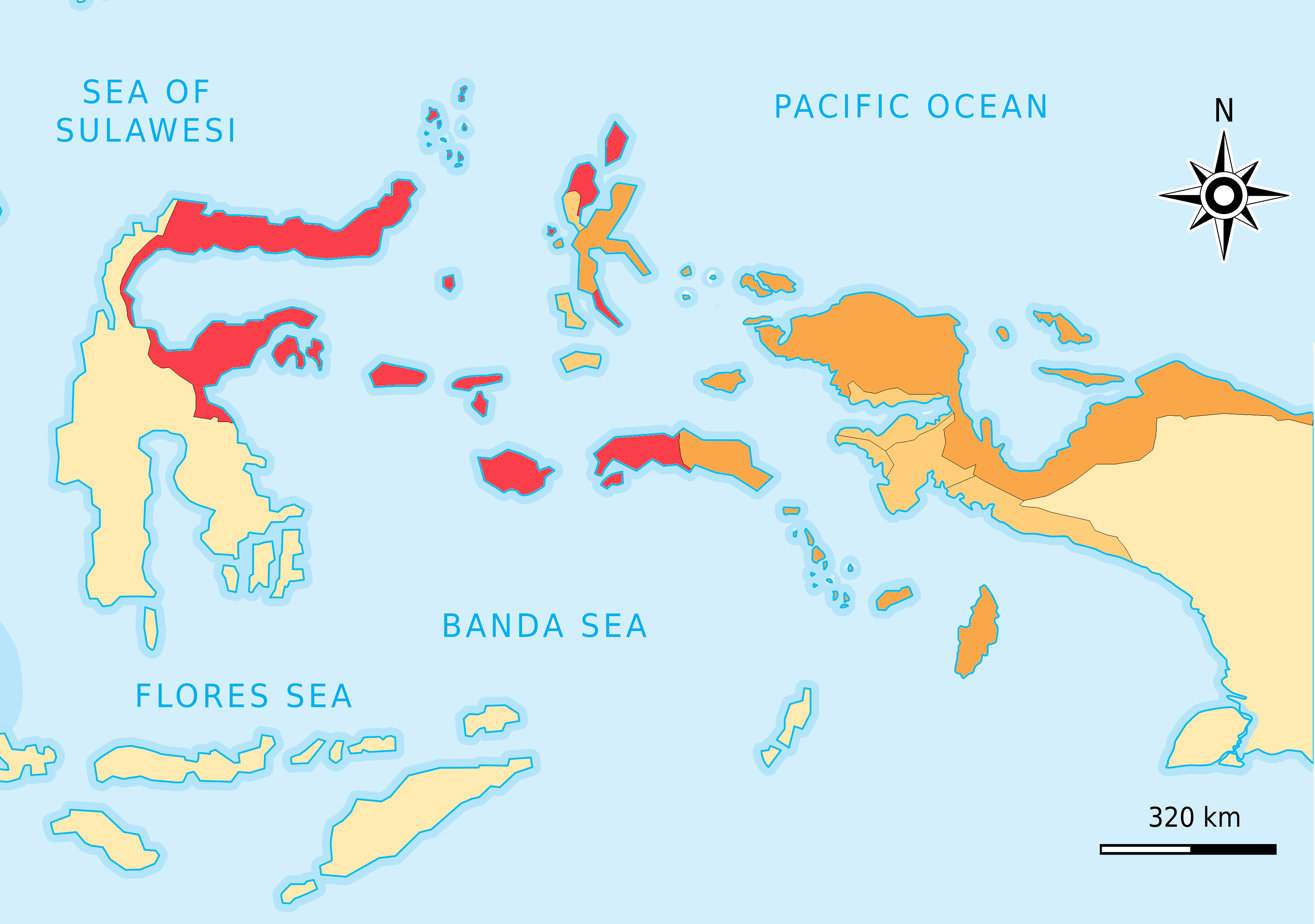
Territories associated with Ternate (red) and Tidore (orange), and Tidore vassals (light orange), in the VOC era. The exact area of influence shifted over the centuries; the map depicts the situation at the end of the VOC era.

The Halmaheran and Papuan areas became economically important for Tidore, which had lost the sago-producing Payahe area in Halmahera in the war in 1649. This and other losses made Tidore look for supplies further to the east. There were sago-rich areas in Gamrange in south-eastern Halmahera, while the Papuan areas provided sea and forest products and slaves. Among the valuable items brought from the far east of Saifuddin's realm were decorous sea-shells, large pearls, ambergris and birds of paradise, all of which had a European market. Papuan raiders were widely feared in eastern Indonesia, and seem to have acted with the understanding Sultan Tidore, beyond the control of the VOC.

== Political strengthening ==
Saifuddin took care to act as a ruler on equal status with the Ternate Sultan. Unlike the Ternatan counterpart, however, he did not try to disrupt traditional institutions in order to concentrate his personal powers. Rather, he shored up popular support by displays of liberality and generosity, distributing wealth among the chiefs (Bobatos). He also made repeated suggestions to the Dutch authorities to reinstall the long-vanished Jailolo Sultanate in order to revert to the traditional quadripartition of Maluku. This was also a way to weaken Ternate's power. However, the last Jailolo heir Kaicili Alam died in 1684 without being installed. Moreover, Saifuddin sided with the VOC when Sultan Sibori Amsterdam launched an anti-Dutch rebellion in 1679–1681, and assisted the Europeans with soldiers and ships to crush the uprising. While the defeated Ternate had to sign a treaty that transformed it into a formal vassal (leen), Tidore preserved its independence under Dutch protection for another century, strengthened by the economic redistribution system with Halmahera and Papua. However, the VOC denied him the rights to eastern Ceram and Ceram Laut, commercially vibrant areas which had been held or claimed by previous Tidore Sultans.

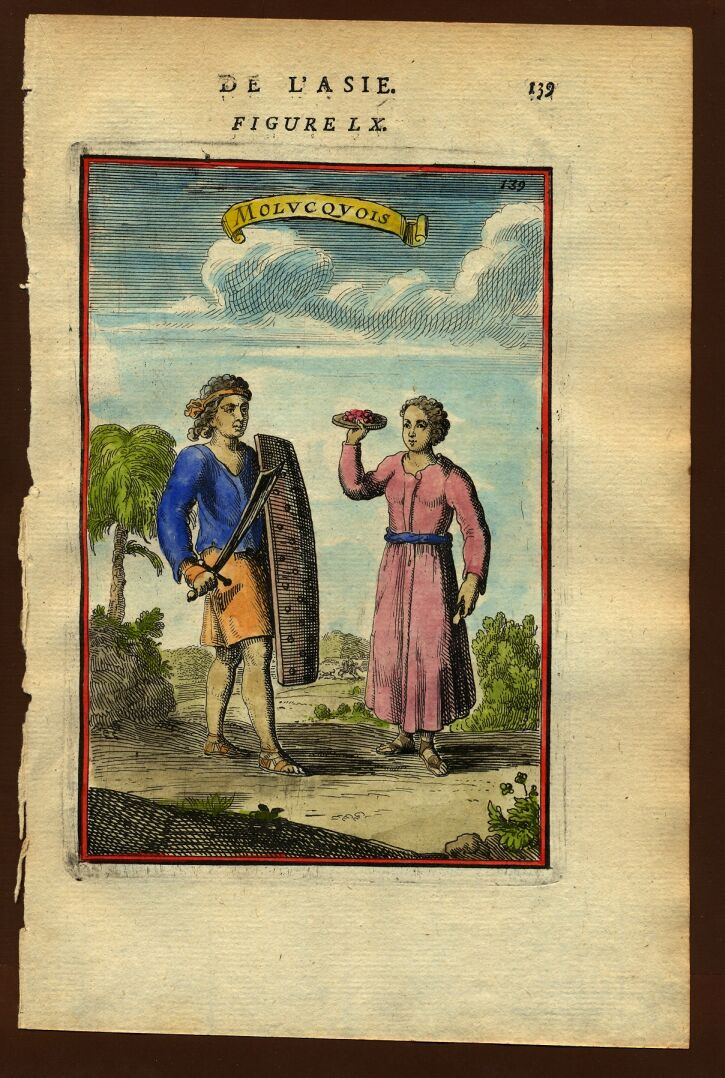
Malukan people, illustration from 1683.

Personally, Saifuddin was regarded an expert in Malukan tradition who had a great respect for the ways of the ancestors and tried to order his kingdom according to this. In this he was relatively successful and was seen as a highly efficacious ruler. In spite of keeping a partly Spanish demeanor, he was a strongly Islamic figure known for his poetical and mystical speeches in the mosque. He contracted leprosy after some years, but continued to govern his kingdom, communicating with official through the wall of an incense-filled room. He is one of the first Indonesian rulers of whom a painted portrait is preserved (at the Czartoryski Museum in Kraków), where signs of the sickness can be seen. He was pushed to install his son Kaicili Seram (Hamza Faharuddin) as formal ruler though he continued to handle the important issues. Seram married a daughter of Mandar Syah of Ternate who had previously been the wife of the Jailolo heir Kaicili Alam, thus seemingly binding the two kingdoms; however the princess soon returned to Ternate.

== Death and family ==
Sultan Saifuddin died on 2 October 1687, after permitting his co-wives who had not borne children to return to their respective families. Two years later he was succeeded by Hamza Faharuddin, formally Sultan since 1674, in a regular way. From Saifuddin the four main branches of the royal clan descended, to which all later Sultans belonged with one exception. His recorded children are:

- Hamza Faharuddin, or Kaicili Seram, Sultan of Tidore
- Pladok, grandfather of Sultan Kamaluddin
- Bagus
- Muhammad Ali, father of Sultan Jamaluddin
- Kaicili Duko (b. 1641) is sometimes said to be the son of Saifuddin, but was more likely a son of Sultan Saidi

== See also ==
- List of rulers of Maluku
- Spice trade
- Tidore Sultanate
- Sultanate of Ternate

Saifuddin of Tidore
Preceded by Saidi	Sultan of Tidore; 1657-1687	Succeeded by Hamza Faharuddin
