= Jailolo (disambiguation) =

Jailolo is on the island of Halmahera in Indonesia's Maluku Islands and may refer to either:

- Jailolo (town)
- Sultanate of Jailolo
- Jailolo volcanic complex
