= Siege of Jailolo (1550) =

16th-century war

Siege of Jailolo (1550–1551)
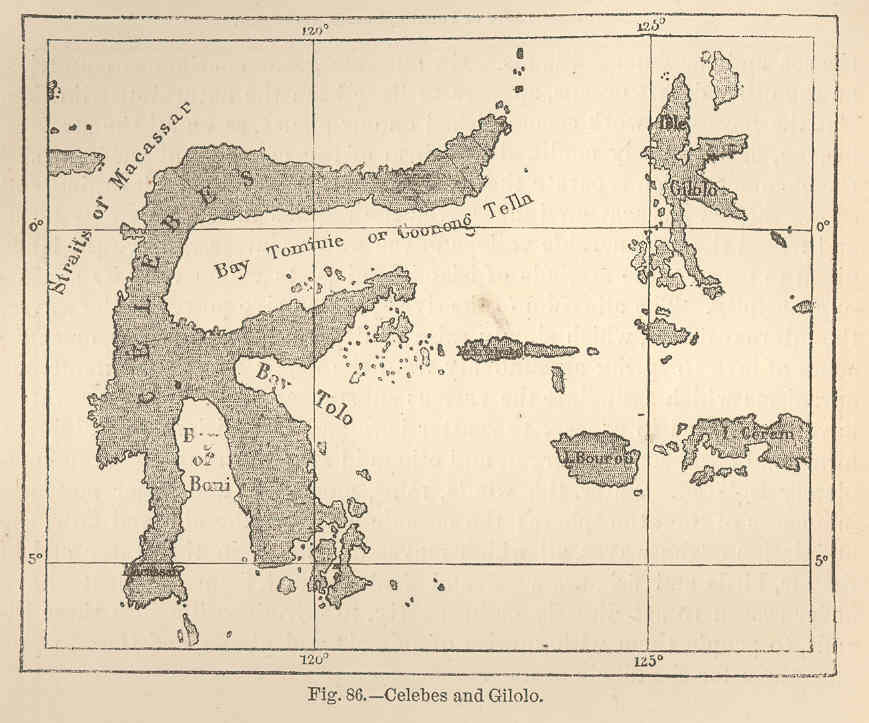
- Map of Jailolo Island
Date	28 December 1550 – 19 March 1551
Location	Jailolo (town), Moluccas
Result	Portuguese allied victory

Belligerents
Portuguese Empire; Sultanate of Ternate; Sultanate of Bacan	Sultanate of Jailolo

Commanders and leaders
Bernaldim de Sousa; Balthasar Velloso; Prince of Bacan	Sultan of Jailolo; Prince of Jailolo

Strength
180 Portuguese soldiers 5,000 allied men from Ternate and Bacan	1,200 soldiers Large quantity of cannons

Casualties and losses
18 Portuguese killed	300 killed Many wounded

The siege of Jailolo (1550–1551) was a successful military expedition launched by Bernaldim de Sousa, a Portuguese commander, against the Sultan of Jailolo, supported by the Sultan of Ternate and the Prince of Batjan, lasting three months.

== Background ==
Conflicts between the leaders of Ternate and Jailolo drew the Portuguese and missionaries into insular warfare during 1550-51. Jailolo, situated seven leagues (28 miles) from the Portuguese fortress at Ternate on the island of Halmahera, had held its own stronghold for seventeen years, dating back to around 1533. During this time, the sultan of Jailolo had seized guns and artillery from the local Christians, using them against the Portuguese and their converts. Known as a great tyrant, he caused many of the converts to suffer martyrdom. Hostilities between Ternate and Jailolo, which had previously been intermittent, became regular starting in 1549.

Bernaldim de Sousa, a Portuguese commander, led an expedition to Jailolo with 180 soldiers, supported by the Sultan of Ternate and the Prince of Batjan, with 5,000 men to the effort. Their objective was to destroy a fortress being built by the Sultan of Jailolo, which posed a threat to Portuguese interests in the region.

== Ambush ==
As Bernaldim de Sousa's forces approached Jailolo, they encountered strong resistance. Balthasar Velloso, leading the vanguard, was ambushed by a force under the Prince of Jailolo, who had concealed his men in a carefully laid trap. Despite the surprise attack, Velloso managed to rally his troops and defend his position with remarkable courage. His forces inflicted heavy losses on the enemy, forcing the attackers to retreat. Meanwhile, Bernaldim de Sousa was also engaged by the forces of Jailolo but succeeded in driving them back into the fortress.

== The siege ==
Following these clashes, Bernaldim de Sousa laid siege to the fortress of Jailolo. He cut off the water supply and blockaded the stronghold, preventing any resupply. The siege lasted for three months, with both sides suffering significant losses. Despite being heavily outnumbered, the defenders of Jailolo held out with remarkable tenacity, enduring starvation and a lack of resources. Finally, their provisions exhausted, the defenders were forced to capitulate. The Portuguese entered the fortress in the presence of the Sultan, committing numerous atrocities during the sacking of the stronghold, killing 300 of them, and 18 of their own, with the number of wounded being greater still. The fortress itself was razed to the ground.

== Aftermath ==
After the siege, the Jailolo were forced to capitulate and agree on harsh treaty for peace, with such hard terms that the Sultan of Jailolo was compelled to give up his royal title and accept himself as a vassal to Ternate, and pay tribute to the Portuguese.

The Sultan was later said to have committed suicide by poison due to grief, and was succeeded by his son, Cachilguzarate.
