= Mudafar Syah I =

Sultan of Ternate
- Reign: 1606–1627
- Predecessor: Saidi Berkat
- Successor: Hamza
- Born: c. 1595
- Died: 16 June 1627
- Father: Saidi Berkat
- Religion: Islam

Sultan Mudafar Syah I (Jawi: سلطان مدفر شاه ١; b. c. 1595–d. 16 June 1627), also spelt Muzaffar Syah, was the ninth Sultan of Ternate who ruled from 1606 to 1627. He reigned during an important transitional phase, when the Dutch East India Company gained ascendency in the Maluku Islands and began to regulate the commerce in spices. This was the beginning of the colonial subordination of Maluku that would accelerate during his successors.

== Sultan in opposition ==
Mudafar was born around 1595 to Sultan Saidi Berkat (r. 1583–1606). It is unclear if his mother was Saidi's main consort Ainal-ma-lamo or a co-wife from soa Jika. At his birth, the spice empire of Ternate was still intact, and invasion attempts by Spanish-Portuguese forces were regularly thwarted. Ternate had vassals in North Sulawesi, the Sangihe Islands, Halmahera, Buru Island, Ceram and the Banda Islands. However, the arrival of the Dutch, political and commercial rivals of the Spanish-Portuguese empire, alerted the Spanish authorities in the Philippines. Dutch seafarers entered negotiations with Saidi in 1599 and onwards and conquered the Iberian fortification on nearby Tidore in 1605. A large Spanish armada invaded Ternate in 1606 and reduced the kingdom to vassalage. Sultan Saidi and most of his family was brought to Manila as prisoners. However, the young Prince Modafar with a number of supporters hid in Halmahera where they found protection with his brother-in-law, King Doa of Jailolo. He was now proclaimed new Sultan of Ternate, though he was not universally recognized.

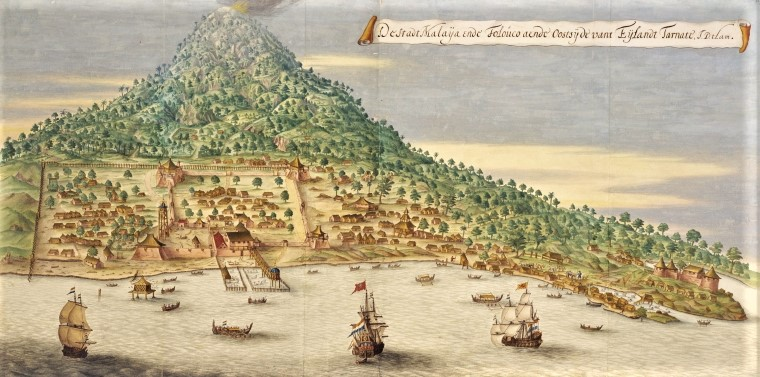
Panorama of Ternate with Malayu and Toloko in about 1620.

== Contract with the VOC ==
Now Mudafar's party became the natural allies of the Dutch East India Company (VOC). Admiral Cornelis Matelief de Jonge arrived to North Maluku in 1607 and made contact with the pretender-Sultan. He concluded a contract with the VOC on 26 May 1607, where the Dutch were acknowledged as protectors and they would all unite to fight the Iberian powers. There was an important commercial aspect with the contract, since Mudafar undertook to only sell cloves produced on the island to the VOC for a fixed price. Defying the Portuguese garrisons on Ternate and Tidore, the Dutch built a fort at Malayu on the eastern side of Ternate. In the following years a series of forts were constructed in North Maluku: four in Ternate, three on Makian, and one each on Moti, Bacan and Jailolo (Halmahera). Ternatans and other allied peoples moved to live under VOC protection close to fortresses.

The new contract was initially seen by the Ternatans as a pact for support, with due commercial advantages for the part that provided assistance. At length, however, the regulations of the spice trade had bad effects for the regional economy. Although the price that the VOC paid for the spices was reasonable, the Ternatans were paid in goods more than in money. The Dutch fixed the prices for the imported goods at an overly high level, so that the producers in practice received less for their cloves than before. As all visits by other European and Asian trading vessels were forbidden, the VOC were not able to bring in sufficient foodstuff (such as rice) and other necessities to meet the needs of the locals. The system therefore led to a comprehensive smuggling from the outside, where Javanese, Malays and Makassarese seafarers braved the European restrictions and paid much higher prices for the spices than the VOC did.

== New Spanish efforts ==
The Spaniards tried to strike back against the VOC alliance using their traditional friends (and rivals of Ternate), the Tidorese. In spite of initial successes against the Ternatan vassal Jailolo in 1608, the efforts could not be sustained, however, since the Tidorese feared Dutch retaliation. The Governor of the Philippines, Juan de Silva, brought Mudafar's exiled father Saidi with him on an expedition in 1611, trying to reconcile with the Ternatans. As this failed, the Spanish fleet attacked and captured a few sites in Halmahera, though they soon reverted to Ternate and the VOC. A new diplomatic foray in 1623 also failed. The Spanish nevertheless kept the Gamalama fortress in Ternate and several forts in Tidore until the 1660s.

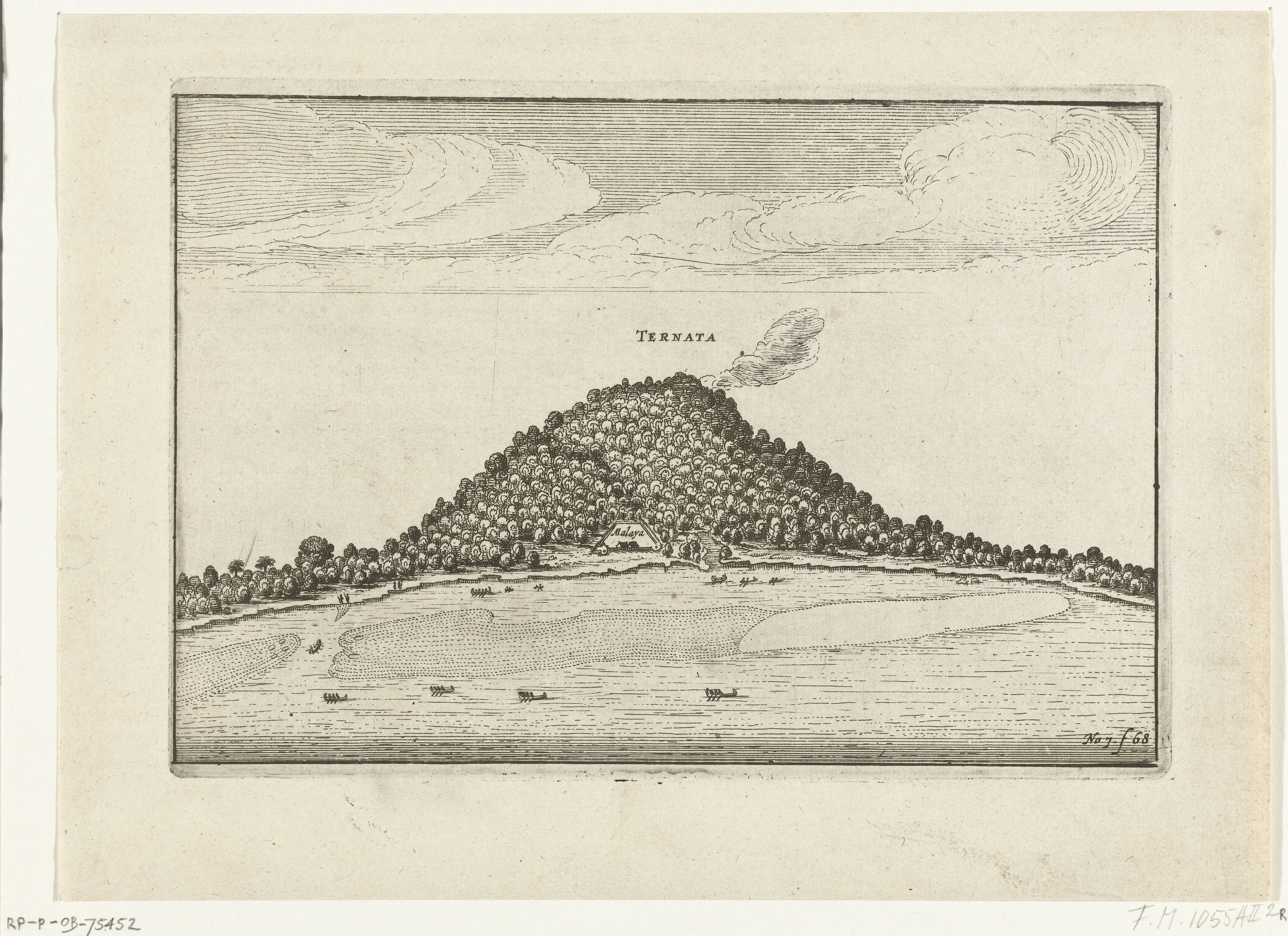
Another view of Ternate Island seen from the east, Dutch illustration from 1607. Fort Malayu is visible in the center.

== Under Company protection ==
A number of startling events took place in Maluku during the time of Mudafar Syah. These included the genocidal Dutch conquest of the Banda Islands, a traditional vassal of Ternate, in 1621, which secured VOC exploitation of the valuable nutmeg that grew on the islands. Furthermore, the Dutch strengthened their grip on Ambon, parts of which were also Ternatan dependencies, through the equally notorious Amboyna massacre that eliminated English influence. Though Mudafar Syah presided over a formally independent realm, the Dutch and Spanish regarded their respective Ternatan and Tidorese allies as mere auxiliaries whose wishes were subordinated to those of the Europeans. Mudafar was, moreover, no forceful figure and was far from popular with the Dutch. He was considered a lethargic youth sometimes capable of fits of cruelty. His first wife was a daughter of the Sangaji (sub-ruler) of Sahu in Halmahera, but she somehow displeased him, and he killed her with his kris and had her body thrown into the sea. He also asked for the daughter of the Tidorese crown prince Ngarolamo in marriage, but this was opposed by his kinsman Kapita Laut Ali, who wanted her for himself. Kapita Laut Ali was the Ternatan sea lord and was remembered by historical tradition as a forceful figure who maintained the wide influence of the Ternate kingdom. Mudafar Syah eventually fell sick and died on 16 June 1627, only 32 years old. Though he left a number of sons, his successor was Hamza, a cousin of his father.

== Family ==
Sultan Mudafar Syah had several wives and co-wives:

- A daughter of the Sangaji of Sahu, Halmahera, married in 1612
- A sister of Kapita Laut Ali, married in 1612 as co-wife
- A daughter of a Ternate chief
- A daughter of the Sangaji of Sarangani, South Mindanao, fled to the Spanish in 1616
- A daughter of the Sangaji of Gamkonara, married in 1623
- A daughter of the Sangaji of Ngofakiaha, married in 1626
- Bida, from soa Toboleo, mother of Mandar Syah
- Woman from soa Kalamata, mother of Kaicili Kalamata
- Woman from soa Kulaba, mother of Kaicili Manilha

His sons were:

- Mandar Syah, sultan of Ternate
- Kaicili Kalamata
- Kaicili Manilha

== See also ==
- Sultanate of Ternate
- Sultanate of Tidore
- Sultanate of Jailolo
- Spice trade
- List of rulers of Maluku

Mudafar Syah I
| Preceded by Saidi Berkat | Sultan of Ternate; 1606–1627 | Succeeded by Hamza |
