= Saidi of Tidore =

Saidi

Sultan of Tidore
- Reign: 1640-1657
- Predecessor: Gorontalo
- Successor: Saifuddin
- Died: 7 January 1657
- Father: Ngarolamo
- Religion: Islam

Sultan Saidi (Jawi: سلطان سعيدي; d. 7 January 1657) was the tenth Sultan of Tidore in Maluku Islands. He was also known as Magiau (مݢيأو), and ruled from 1640 to 1657. His reign saw intermittent hostilities with Tidore's traditional rival, the Sultanate of Ternate, which included interference in an anti-Dutch rebellion in Ternate and Ambon and attempts to increase Tidorese territory in Maluku. By the time of Saidi's reign Tidore had gained a political position in parts of the Papuan territories.

== Power struggles and succession ==
Saidi was a son of Sultan Ngarolamo who was deposed by his rival Gorontalo in 1634. He stayed with his father and 200 loyal retainers in exile on Ternate Island until 1639, when Ngarolamo was killed because of his secret deliberations with the Spanish, the traditional allies of the Tidore Sultans. This murder was soon followed by another one in August 1639, when Gorontalo was killed by a Spanish officer for treacherous collusion with the Ternatans. Now Tidore was split between two camps; one favoured Gorontalo's son Kaicili Golofino while another wanted Saidi. The succession dispute lasted into 1640 but was finally resolved in favour of Saidi, who was the Spanish candidate. Ternate's ally, the Dutch East India Company (VOC) preferred to stay out of this dispute.

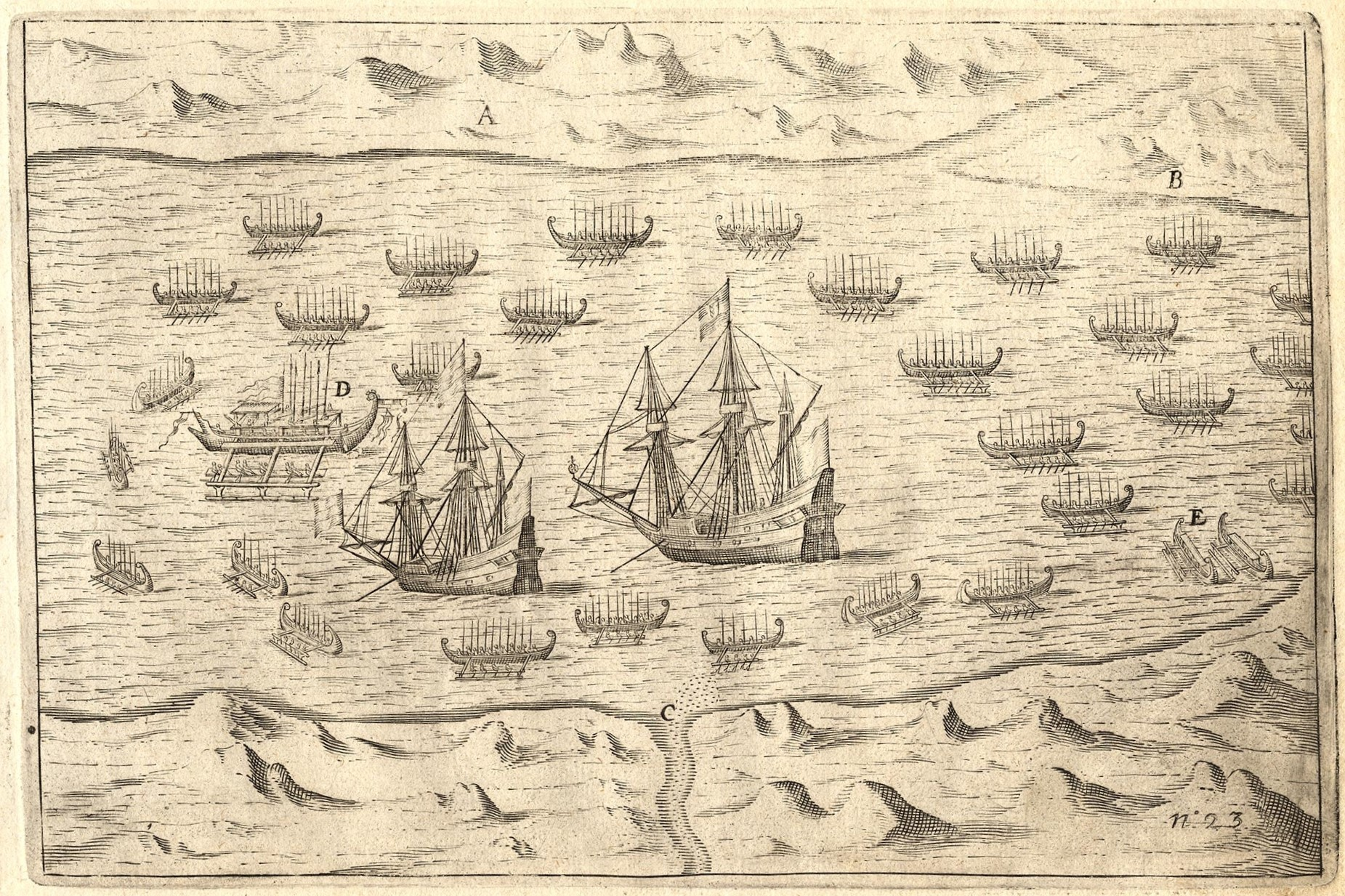
Dutch image from 1646 showing Dutch and indigenous vessels with Tidore Island in the upper part, actually illustrating an event in 1599.

== Uneasy relationship with the Spanish ==
At his accession Saidi had to promise to fulfill a number of points. He should provide military assistance to the Spanish establishments in Maluku when needed, he was only to sell cloves to the Spaniards, and he must allow anyone who so desired to become a Catholic. According to Spanish opinions he failed in all these commitments. On the contrary he strove to manage the spice trade in Tidore's own interests and forbade his subjects to sell the cloves to Spanish buyers. Saidi also interfered in the affairs of the Sangihe Islands north of Maluku, vassals under the Spanish Philippines, where he supported a Muslim rebel with soldiers and Islamic preachers against the Christian ruler of Kalongan. He even had the rebel chief consecrated as ruler in the mosque of Tidore and, in the Spanish interpretation, reserved for himself the role of emperor. The precarious situation of the Spanish in Maluku nevertheless forced them to maintain the Tidore alliance, since Saidi was their only potential supporter in the region.

== Continuing struggles against Ternate and the VOC ==
The ongoing war between the Spanish Empire and the Dutch Republic was matched by hostilities in Maluku where Spain and Tidore stood against the VOC and Ternate. The Dutch actively tried to prevent any attempts to make a separate peace between Ternate and Tidore. The VOC noted that Saidi was a political man who was no great friend of Spain but who strove to secure Tidore's position within the power balance between the Europeans. Several clashes nevertheless took place during the 1640s. Tidore turned out to be the more successful "due to its greater carefulness and bravery" Foodstuff was brought to Tidore from its vassals in Halmahera and even from the Papuan Islands, where Tidorese influence had been established by this time. One of Saidi's helpers was the chief Gurabesi whom later traditions associate with the origins of Tidore rule in the Papuan lands. In 1649 a number of battles and mutual raids took place, culminating in a Tidore-Spanish invasion in Ternate where the Dutch were defeated with considerable losses. Before the VOC were able to stage a counter-attack, news of the Peace of Westphalia reached the East Indies, and hostilities were cancelled.

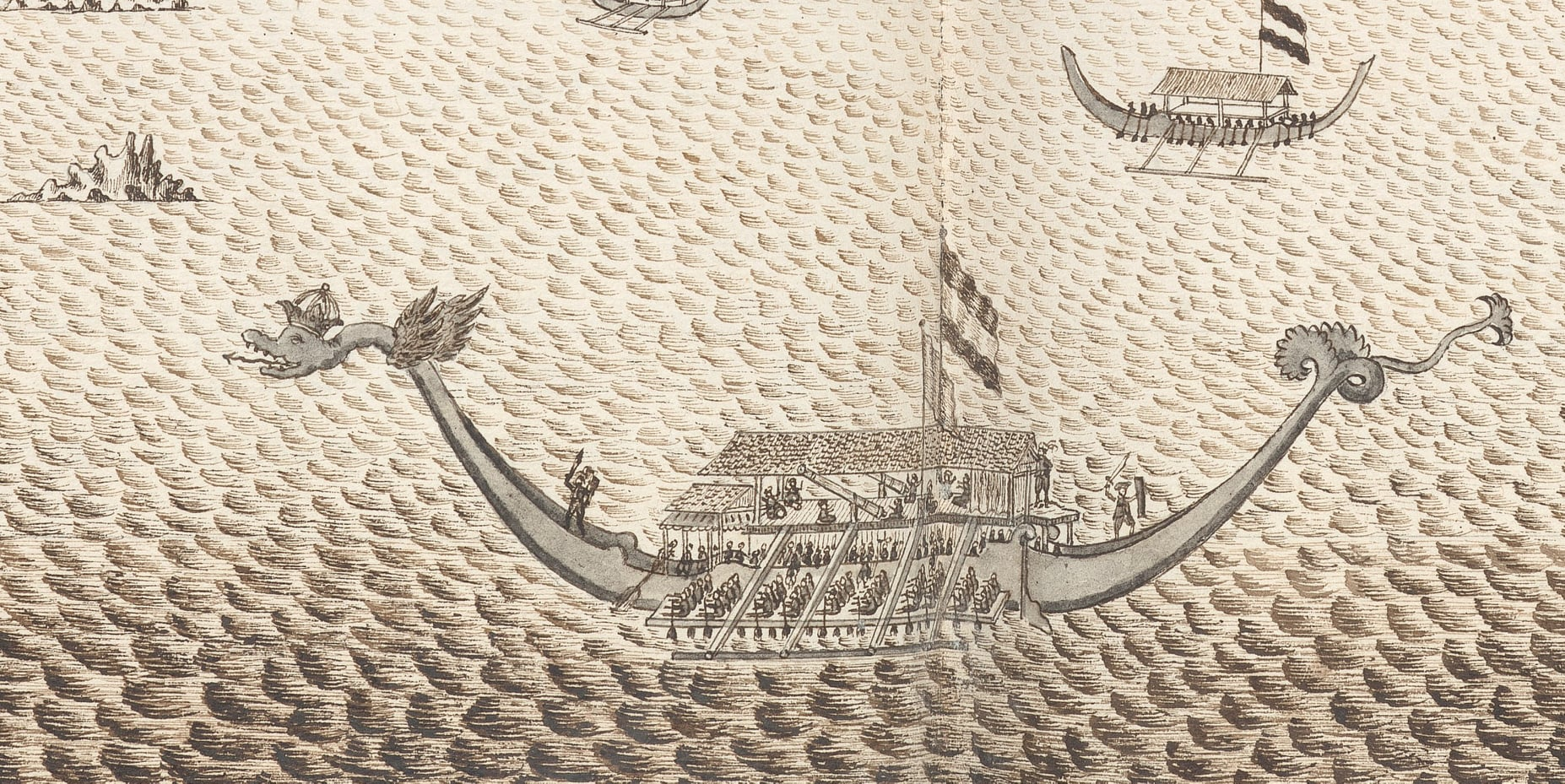
Malukan kora kora used in the 1649 Dutch conquest of Rarakit on Ceram, a place that sheltered Tidorese and Papuan opponents.

== Interference in anti-VOC rebellion ==
Shortly after this, the VOC-backed Sultan of Ternate, Mandar Syah, was opposed by his brothers and part of the Ternatan elite. The Dutch commander Arnold de Vlamingh van Outshoorn suppressed an attempt to replace Mandar Syah, and the Ternatans had to agree on a treaty in 1652 where they were stipulated to extirpate clove trees in their dominions. This would ensure VOC monopoly on the spice trade, but the treaty was insufficient as long as Tidore sold its cloves to other buyers. Since Saidi actively supported the rebels in Ternate without Spanish approval, De Vlamingh van Outshoorn declared war on Tidore, hoping to eliminate the Tidorese clove production. In order not to antagonize the Spanish, Tidore Island was not attacked; rather, an expedition under Simon Cos was dispatched to worst Tidore's vassals in Halmahera and the Papuan Islands. The expedition was not particularly successful, and in the meantime the Papuan Raja of Salawati raided in Ambon on behalf of Sultan Saidi. However, the efforts of Saidi to take over the Ternatan parts of Halmahera also failed, and the increasingly irritated Spanish finally arrested the Sultan in 1654 for disturbing the peace. He was however soon set free again, and peace with the VOC followed. The Spanish claimed that they saved the skins of the Dutch in Maluku by depriving the rebels in Ternate and Ambon of Tidorese support.

== Death ==
Sultan Saidi died on 7 January 1657, since long suffering from leprosy. He sired at least three children:

- Kaicili Weda (alias Mole)
- Kaicili Duko (b. 1641 - d. after 1705) who became a Catholic in 1665
- A daughter who was betrothed to Mandar Syah in 1651 though the engagement was broken due to the war.

His demise immediately triggered a succession war. Weda was proclaimed Sultan on his father's demise. However, the VOC and Ternate brought forward his second cousin Kaicili Golofino who had stayed in exile in Ternate since 1640. Golofino soon had the upper hand and was enthroned under the name Sultan Saifuddin. Under him Tidore finally took the step from a Spanish to a Dutch ally.

== See also ==
- List of rulers of Maluku
- Spice trade
- Tidore Sultanate
- Sultanate of Ternate

Saidi of Tidore
Preceded by Gorontalo	Sultan of Tidore; 1640-1657	Succeeded by Saifuddin
