= Sibori Amsterdam =

Sultan Sibori Amsterdam

Sultan of Ternate
- Reign: 1675–1690
- Predecessor: Mandar Syah
- Successor: Toloko
- Born: c. 1654
- Died: 27 April 1690
- Father: Mandar Syah
- Mother: Lawa
- Religion: Islam

Sultan Sibori Amsterdam (Jawi: سلطان سيبوري اميستردام; b. c. 1654 – d. 27 April 1690) was the twelfth Sultan of Ternate in the Maluku Islands who reigned from 1675 to 1690. He participated in the last outburst of armed resistance against the Dutch East India Company (VOC) in 1679–1681, but was eventually forced to sign a new treaty that reduced Ternate to a mere vassal of the Company. In that way he was the last formally independent Sultan before the onset of early-modern Dutch colonialism.

== Succession to the throne ==
Sibori Amsterdam was born around 1654 as the eldest son of Sultan Mandar Syah and his consort Lawa. The Dutch leanings of his father made him name two of his sons after cities in the Netherlands - a junior brother was called Prince Rotterdam. When Mandar Syah died from an epidemic in January 1675, Sibori Amsterdam succeeded to the throne with Dutch support. He professed his pro-Dutch standing, saying "If my father was half a Dutchman, I shall certainly be a whole one". Like his predecessor he realized that a good relationship with the Dutch could raise his prestige and power, since Ternate's resources were fragile. Thus he received a Dutch bodyguard including a sergeant and a corporal, which increased his reputations. It should be recalled that the VOC was at the peak of its power at this time, after victories in Ambon, Palembang, Aceh, Makassar, and Java. The new Sultan was nevertheless dissatisfied with the spice monopoly that the Company had imposed on his father, which led to a shortage of money for the Ternate court.

== Rebellion ==
The Sultan gave proof of military prowess in an expedition to Siau Island in 1677, which turned out to be a success. This contributed in strengthening his royal authority to the detriment of older, consensus-based forms of governance. One aristocrat who felt threatened by Sibori Amsterdam's policy was his brother-in-law Kaicili Alam (d. 1684), the heir to the defunct Jailolo kingdom, who sought and found sanctuary at the Dutch Fort Oranje on Ternate, to the great irritation of the Sultan. Shortly after, the three most important officials of the kingdom, the Jogugu (first minister), the Kapita Laut (the sea lord) and the Hukum (magistrate), fled to Ternate's traditional rival, the Tidore Sultanate, after which Sibori Amsterdam abolished the Jogugu position altogether for a while. Later on, Kaicili Alam found favour with the Sultan because of his warlike feats and was made Jogugu of Ternate.

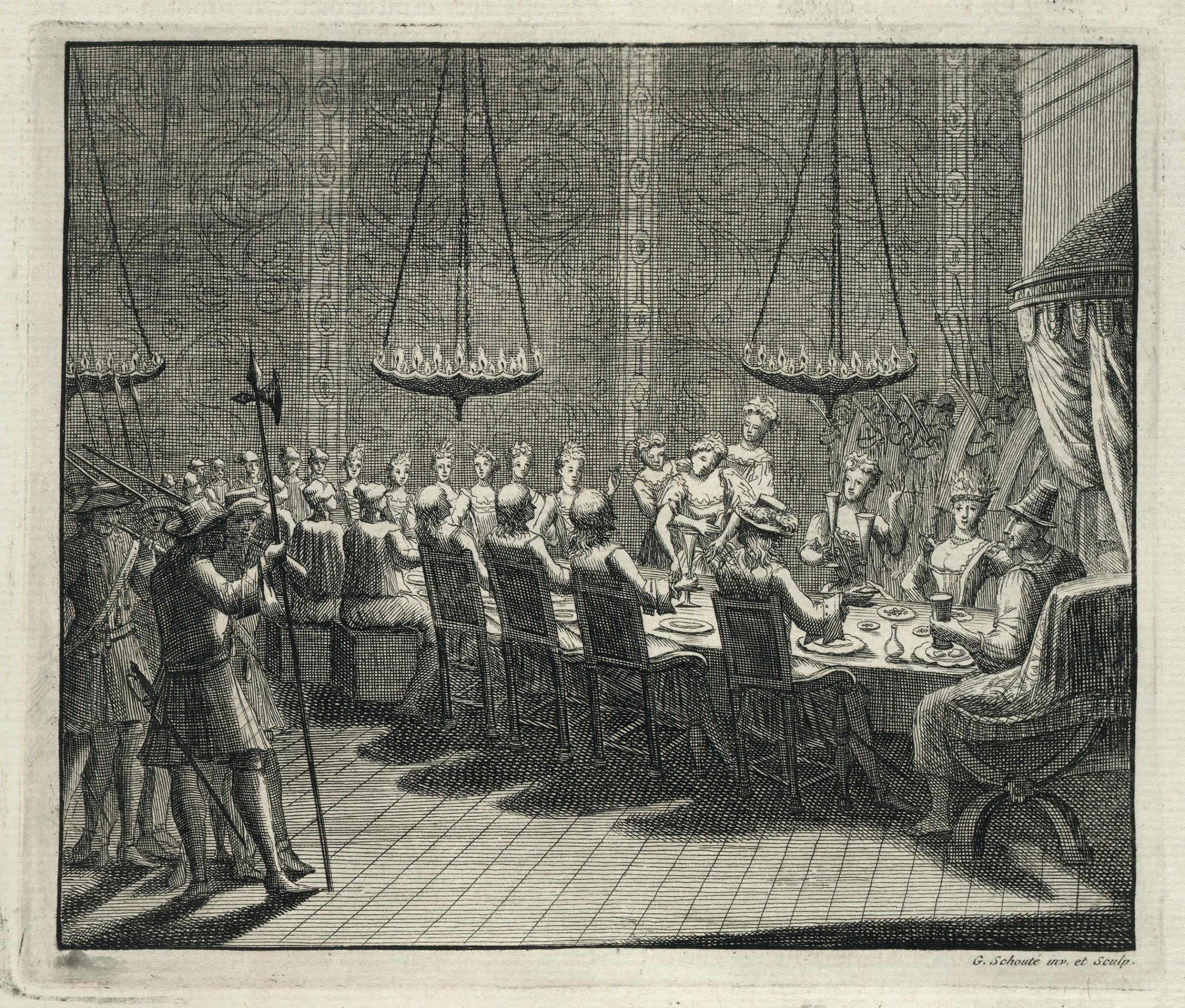
The Dutch Governor Robertus Padtbrugge at table with Sibori Amsterdam, right before the outbreak of the rebellion in 1679.

In the meanwhile, the VOC policy of forcing the Ternatan elite to extirpate clove trees in the realm to ensure VOC monopoly, met with growing resentment. The ties between the center of the kingdom and its outlying dependencies became strained, which at length affected relations between the Sultan and the VOC. Sibori Amsterdam fell out with the VOC governor Robertus Padtbrugge, not least because of the latter's promotion of Christian missionaries in the staunchly Islamic kingdom. The Sultan reportedly circulated a letter in the Ambon Quarter enjoining the chiefs to massacre the Dutch. The errand was however discovered and cruelly executed by the VOC in Ambon. Next, Sibori Amsterdam invited Robertus Padtbrugge for a banquet in his palace. The atmosphere was tense and the European guests feared assassination. Eventually the governor's daughter simulated a swoon and so gave Padtbrugge and his entourage an excuse to withdraw. Next day, however, several Dutch soldiers were murdered. Sibori Amsterdam hastily brought his harem, Bobatos (chiefs) and artillery to Jailolo on Halmahera in open defiance of the Company.

The rebellion, which broke out in 1679, had a pronounced religious side, and Muslim preachers from Banten were active in inspiring anti-Dutch insurgency. Some areas, such as North Halmahera and Bacan supported the Sultan, while Ternate's old rival, the Tidore Sultanate, backed up the Dutch positions and contributed with korakoras (large outriggers used in warfare). Sibori's attempts to enlist support from the Muslims of Mindanao were unsuccessful. The main Ternatan strongholds in Halmahera, Sahu and Gamkonara, fell to the VOC forces in 1681, and internal divisions among the rebels spelled the end of the movement. Sibori Amsterdam, abandoned by most of his followers, was finally captured in a bath house in August 1681 while he was massaged with fragrant oils by ladies of his harem.

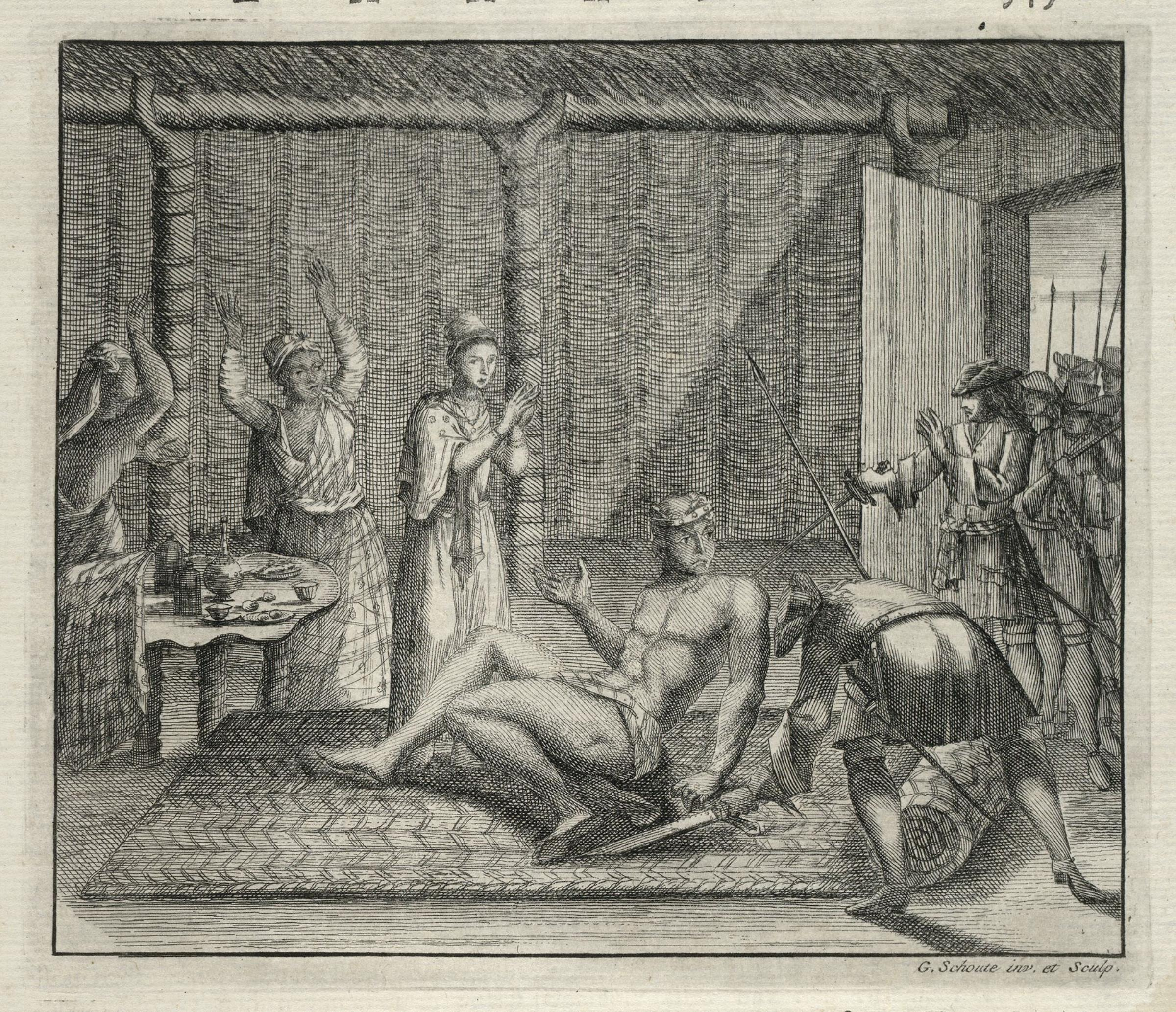
The capture of Sibori Amsterdam in 1681.

== Vassal under the VOC ==
The Sultan was brought to Batavia and interrogated by the VOC authorities; however it was not found necessary to depose him. Rather, the status of Ternate as a formally sovereign state was abrogated through a new treaty on 17 July 1683. In a European legal sense, Ternate now became a vassal (leen) under the Company. In Ternatan terms, the VOC became the "father" and the Ternate kingdom the "child", and the Dutch had a decisive voice in the appointment of new Sultans. The Dutch proceeded to delineate the borders of the Ternate Sultanate with more rigour than before. The gains made in the Bungaya Treat of 1667 were mostly confirmed, but the gold-rich Gorontalo and Limboto, the Christian settlements at the Gulf of Tomini, and the Sangihe Islands were lost for the Sultan. The political reshuffling meant that the Dutch no longer saw it necessary to pay annual "money of recognition" for the extirpation of clove trees in Ternatan territory. However, the Sultan received a subsidy of 6,400 rijksdaalders to maintain his court.

Sultan Sibori Amsterdam seemed truly grateful to be reinstated in his kingdom, rather than being exiled or even executed. He remained an overtly loyal vassal until his death, which took place on 27 April 1690. None of his children were able to gain the throne, which went to his brother Kaicili Toloko (r. 1692-1714). Sibori Amsterdam's posthumous reputation was dubious: his younger contemporary François Valentijn described him as "inhumane, sanguinary, capricious" while the Ternatans regarded him as cruel, crafty and unlucky. His reign inaugurated a century of relatively peaceful conditions in Maluku. However, the destruction of Ternate's independence henceforth made Maluku into an economic backwater, and any dynamics vanished in the dynastic history of the Sultanate.

== Family ==
Sultan Sibori Amsterdam had the following wives and co-wives:

- Tuari from Sula Besi, mother of Maryam and Anari
- A daughter of the Raja of Tabukan
- Boki Ruse (Father Kaicili Kalamata and mother Daeng Nija Karaeng Panaikang from Makassar)
- The widow of a Chinese, later executed
- A daughter-in-law of this woman
- Gorontalese slave woman, mother of Kabruwama
- Madani, mother of Batavia
- Yaru, mother of Oranje
- Kene, mother of Raja Guna

His children were:

- Boki Maryam, b. about 1682
- Boki Anari, b. about 1687
- Kaicili Kabruwana, b. about 1683
- Kaicili Batavia, b. about 1685
- Kaicili Oranje, b. about 1689
- Kaicili Raja Guna, b. 1690/91

== See also ==
- List of rulers of Maluku
- Sultanate of Ternate
- Tidore Sultanate

Sibori Amsterdam
Preceded by Mandar Syah	Sultan of Ternate; 1675–1690	Succeeded by Toloko
