= Ngarolamo =

Sultan of Tidore
- Reign: 1627-1634
- Predecessor: Mole Majimu
- Successor: Gorontalo
- Died: July 1639
- Religion: Islam

Sultan Ngarolamo (Jawi: سلطان ڠور ملامو; b. c. 1590-d. July 1639) was the eighth Sultan of Tidore in Maluku Islands. He was also known as Sultan Alauddin (سلطان علاءالدين), or Kaicili Ngaro (کچيل ڠور; alternatively Naro), ruling from 1627 to 1634. Due to a combination of factors he was deposed after a short reign and was eventually killed at the instigation of the Sultan of Ternate.

== Contested throne ==
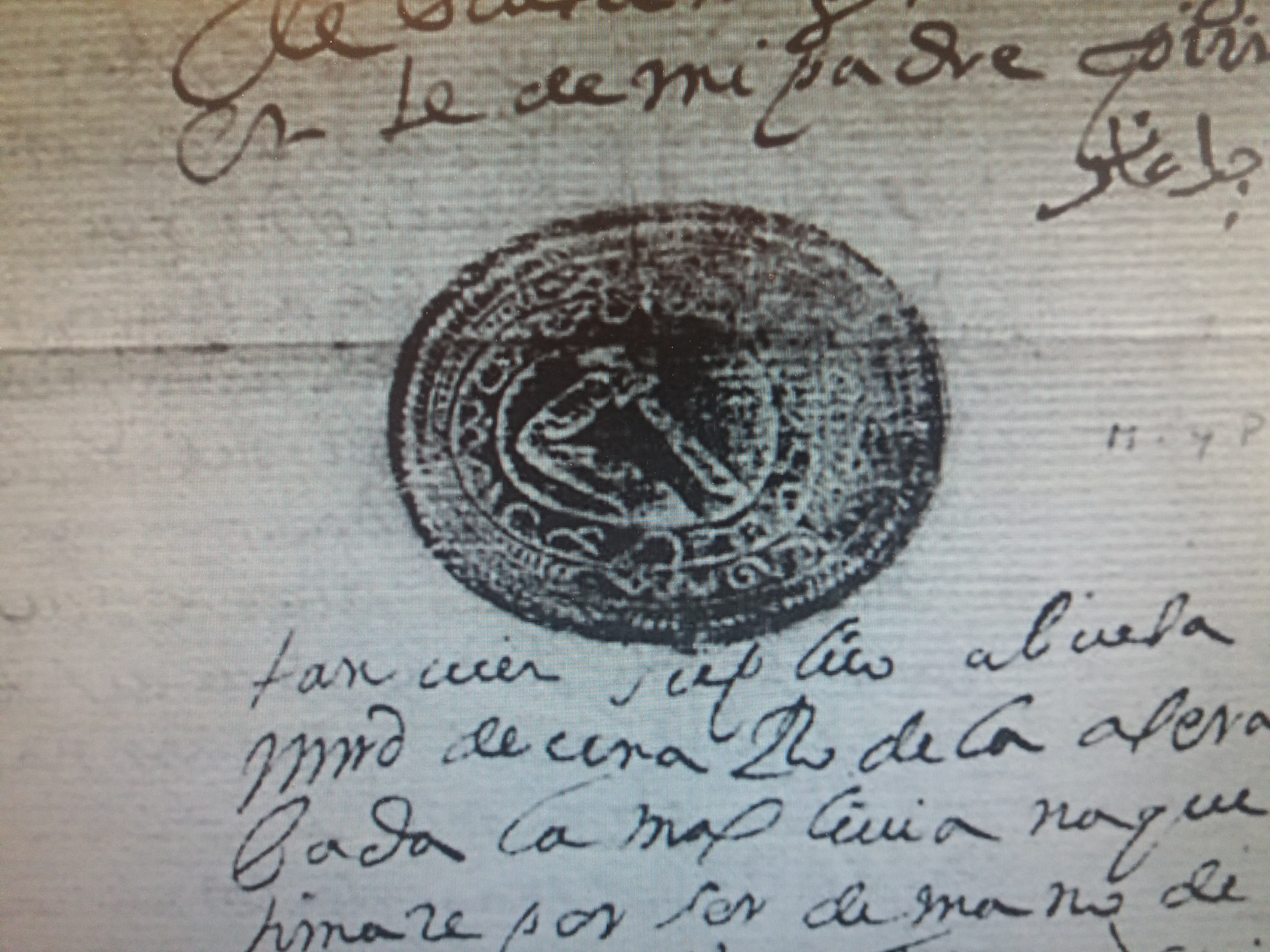
Seal of Prince Ngaro with an arm holding a klewang (cutlass); letter written to the Spanish authorities in 1617.

Kaicili (prince) Ngaro or Ngarolamo was the only son of Sultan Mole Majimu, being born around 1590. He was consequently groomed as Mole's successor and was co-ruling Tidore in the 1610s since his father was already quite old. Mole complained about the headstrong character of his son, who made unauthorized efforts to marry the widowed Queen of Jailolo, a princess from the rival Sultanate of Ternate. He was also a warrior of some note; in 1614 he raided Morotai, ostensibly to prevent it from moving over to Ternate and the VOC. This irritated the Spanish allies since he killed two baptized rulers and enslaved numbers of Christian people. Nor was he entirely popular among the Tidorese elite due to his habit of taking advantage of the wives of married men. His cousin and rival Kaicili Gorontalo, on the other hand, commanded much respect, though he stayed in Ternate. When the old Mole Majimu died in 1627, Ngarolamo nevertheless succeeded to the throne. Like his predecessors he was dependent on the Spanish who were established in a number of fortresses on Tidore Island and were the arch-rivals of the Dutch East India Company who dominated most of Maluku. There was a state of low-intensive warfare between Tidore and Ternate and their respective European allies.

== Deposal ==
Early in his reign, Ngarolamo irritated the Spanish authorities by forbidding his subjects to sell cloves to the Spanish captain of Tidore, as had previously been the case. He also negotiated with Sultan Hamza of Ternate who wished to marry his daughter. The Dutch, hearing this, made efforts to stop the marriage between an ally and an enemy, and managed to postpone it. Captain Pedro de Heredia considered that Ngarolamo leagued with the Dutch, while many Tidorese grandees also wanted the get rid of the Sultan. Finally Hamza of Ternate brought forward Kaicili Gorontalo, who was said to be the most legitimate heir to the kingship, and helped him over to Tidore Island. Gorontalo was acknowledged as lawful ruler with the approbation of Captain Heredia in April 1634. He and his associates then attacked Ngarolamo who still had followers in the royal settlement Soa Siu. Though reputed to be a good and valiant warrior, the Sultan had to flee his kingdom in the end. The ever-scheming Hamza gave him sanctuary in Ternate, provided that he finally gave him his daughter in marriage. The Dutch were discontented with the self-willed kingmaking activities of Hamza which might increase the powers of Ternate in a way detrimental to Company interests, but there was little they could do. With the new and the deposed Tidorese Sultans both indebted to him, Hamza could pursue his interests in the periphery of Maluku with little interference from Tidore. The Spanish authorities in the Philippines were also less than happy about Heredia's overbearing policy in supporting Ngarolamo's expulsion.

== Death ==
Ngarolamo stayed on in Malayu in Ternate for some years, but always hoped to regain his throne. In his debauched and impoverished state he began to negotiate with the Spanish, asking to stay among them. The Spanish authorities in Manila, on their part, entertained advanced plans to reinstall Ngarolamo as Sultan. Hamza got wind of this and realized that the old king was a potential threat and might be used for Spanish machinations. He and the Ternatan grandees therefore decided his death in 1639 with the full knowledge of Sultan Gorontalo. Since Hamza did not want the regicide to take place in Ternate, the ex-ruler was brought to Jailolo in Halmahera on a boat, ostensibly to make a residence for him there. During the passage, three Tidorese boats showed up. As the crews dared not come near him out of respect, they shot him with their muskets from a distance. The body of Ngarolamo was brought to Ternate and buried on 15 July. However, Gorontalo himself was in turn murdered by a Spanish delegation some weeks later. Ngarolamo's son Saidi was appointed Sultan in his stead.

== See also ==
- List of rulers of Maluku
- Spice trade
- Tidore Sultanate
- Sultanate of Ternate

Ngarolamo
Preceded by Mole Majimu	Sultan of Tidore; 1627-1634	Succeeded by Gorontalo
