= Gorontalo of Tidore =

Gorontalo

Sultan of Tidore
- Reign: 1634-1639
- Predecessor: Ngarolamo
- Successor: Saidi
- Died: 10 August 1639
- Father: Kaicili Kota (?)
- Mother: Ternatan princess
- Religion: Islam

Sultan Gorontalo (Jawi: سلطان ݢرنتالو; died 10 August 1639) was the ninth Sultan of Tidore in Maluku Islands, ruling from 1634 to 1639. His brief reign was caught up in the tension between the Spanish Empire and the Dutch East India Company, leading to his violent death in 1639.

== Background ==
The royal family of Tidore split into two competing lineages in the late 16th century. This was further complicated by the tense relation to Tidore's traditional rival, the Sultanate of Ternate, and by the intense rivalry between the European powers of Spain and the Netherlands. In 1599 the supposedly legitimate candidate Kaicili Kota was sidelined in favour of his half-brother Kaicili Mole Majimu, the reason being his inclination towards Ternate. Mole Majimu (r. 1599–1627) and his son and successor Ngarolamo (r. 1627–1634) held on to the old alliance with the Spanish, while Ternate was closely dependent on the Dutch East India Company or VOC. This led to decades of intermittent warfare in North Maluku up to the Peace of Westphalia. By 1616 the Ternate court received a prince from the rival lineage, Kaicili Gorontalo, "related to the Kings of Ternate and Tidore on his father's and mother's side, and therefore very well-regarded by both nations, so that the prince of Tidore could be preferred according to the right of succession, since the right succession of the kingdom was deprived the father of this Kaicili due to his young age, and the crown went to the present king". Gorontalo was said to have a good character and to attract followers, in contrast with Mole Majimu's unpopular son Ngarolamo.

== Seizing power in Tidore ==
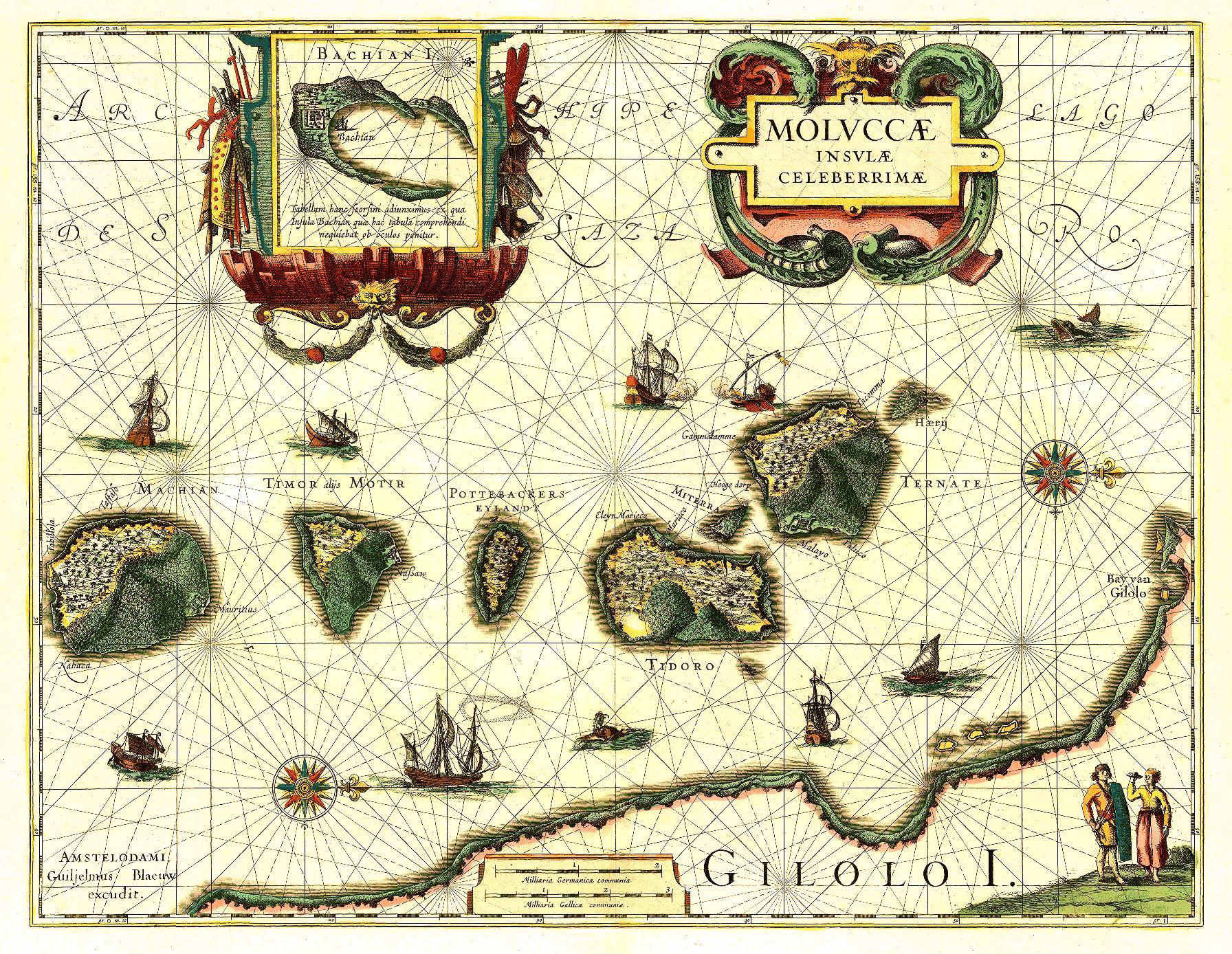
Map of Maluku in 1638.

After his accession to the throne Ngarolamo quickly lost support from part of the Tidorese elite, as well as from the Spanish who by this time kept military posts in Tidore and southern Ternate. In 1634 Sultan Hamza of Ternate used the situation to assist his protégé Gorontalo, whose uncle (oom) he was, in launching a coup. Coming over to Tidore, the prince was accepted as the new Sultan by many Tidorese, as well as by the Spanish Captain Pedro de Heredia. Ngarolamo withdrew to the main village Soa Siu where his position was still strong. When Gorontalo had been duly enthroned he vigorously attacked his rival who had to flee the island. Hamza then invited the ex-ruler to live in Ternate with 200 followers. This event greatly increased Hamza's power in Maluku, to the great irritation of his Dutch allies. They noted that both Gorontalo and Hamza sent envoys to the Spanish Philippines, and that Gorontalo was in a dependent position vis-à-vis his Ternatan counterpart. Hamza and Gorontalo shared a Spanish connection since the former spoke Spanish and was steeped in Spanish culture, and there were rumours that they were looking for Spanish assistance to expel the VOC from Maluku.

As a result of the new Tidore-Ternate concord, the Tidorese in the clove-producing island Makian became so rash that they stole the slaves and servants of the VOC and the locals with impunity. Tidorese activities were also felt in the commercially vital East Ceram whose inhabitants felt badly intimidated by their presence. However, the old state of enmity between the two spice Sultanates flared up again after a few years. Hamza incorporated Dodingen, a strategically important place that guarded Halmahera's east coast, which infuriated Tidore.

== Intrigues and assassination ==
In 1639 the two Sultans once again approached each other and conspired to get rid of the Spanish. The Dutch Governor in Maluku warned Hamza to involve himself in new intrigues, since Tidore could not be trusted. Nevertheless, Hamza and his council endorsed Gorontalo's proposal of an alliance, and a solemn peace was concluded between the two island kingdoms. In the meantime, however, the impoverished ex-Sultan Ngarolamo contacted the Spanish in the Gamalama fortress in Ternate, hoping to regain his throne. The negotiations could not be kept secret, and Hamza and Gorontalo were alerted. The old man was brought on board a Ternatan ship and then killed by Tidorese musketeers in July 1639. However, by now the Spanish Captain Pedro de Mendiola had got wind of the treason committed by Gorontalo, and he decided to act swiftly.

Some weeks after the murder of the ex-ruler, on 10 August, the Sergeant Major Francisco Hernández came over from Gamalama with a galley. He asked to speak with Gorontalo about the fate of some Ternatan prisoners who were held on the galley. Hernández and his entourage were duly brought to the baileu or reception hall, and Gorontalo appeared with a small retinue of 8-10 men. The discussions started in a friendly tone, when one of the reformados (re-allocated soldiers in Spanish service) suddenly pierced the Sultan with a long poignard. Hernández delivered several more cuts while his companions killed or drove off the Sultan's retinue. Gorontalo's son Kaicili Golofino managed to flee from the baileu and retreated to the royal fortress. Few days later, Ngarolamo's son Saidi was secretly brought over from Ternate by night, ostensibly without Hamza's knowledge. Opinions were divided in Tidore how to react to the coup, but Saidi was eventually enthroned through Spanish pressure.

== Family ==
Sultan Gorontalo (in Spanish sources spelled Borontalo) had three known children:

- Kaicili Gorian or Gurajanga (d. 1701), father of Sultan Hasanuddin
- Sultan Saifuddin alias Kaicili Golofino (d. 1687)
- Jouhari, married to Baressi, son of Prince Kalamata of Ternate

== See also ==
- List of rulers of Maluku
- Spice trade
- Tidore Sultanate
- Sultanate of Ternate

Gorontalo of Tidore
Preceded by Ngarolamo	Sultan of Tidore; 1634-1639	Succeeded by Saidi
