= Hamza of Ternate =

Sultan Hamza

Sultan of Ternate
- Reign: 1627–1648
- Predecessor: Mudafar Syah I
- Successor: Mandar Syah
- Died: 6 May 1648
- Father: Kaicili Tolu
- Religion: Islam

Sultan Hamza (Jawi: سلطان حمزة; died 6 May 1648) was the tenth Sultan of Ternate in the Maluku Islands. He ruled from 1627 to 1648, during a time when the Dutch East India Company (VOC) increasingly dominated this part of maritime Southeast Asia, and the increasing power of the Makassar kingdom threatened the Ternatan possessions.

== Spanish exile and return ==
Hamza was the third son of Kaicili (prince) Tolu (d. c. 1590), himself a son of sultan Hairun (r. 1535–1570). His brothers were Hafsin, Naya and Kapita Laut Ali. When the Spanish invaded and occupied Ternate in 1606, Hamza was among the many members of the royal family who were brought to the Spanish Philippines as state prisoners. While in Manila he was Hispanicized in many ways: he was baptized and took the name Pedro de Acuña, after the Spanish governor who had led the 1606 invasion, and married in the church. Since he was therefore expected to follow Iberian interests, the Manila authorities allowed him to return to Ternate in 1627. At this time Ternate was an autonomous kingdom, but was bound by a contract with the VOC to follow Dutch commercial policy, and kept a number of Dutch garrisons on its territory. Some months after Hamza's return, the current Sultan Mudafar Syah I died.

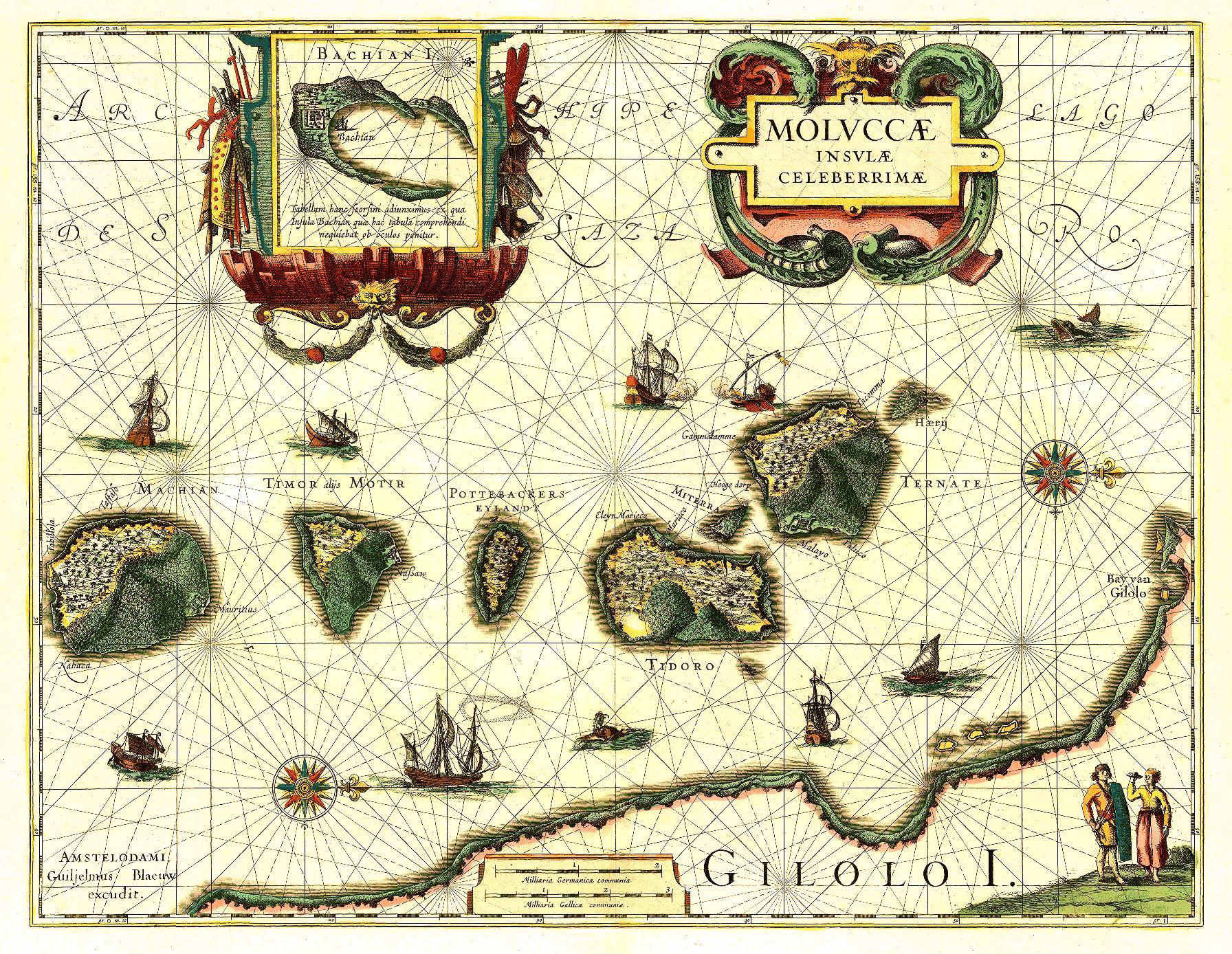
Map of Maluku in 1638.

Although there were other candidates for the throne, the Ternatan state council chose to appoint Hamza as new Sultan of Ternate, the more as he reverted to Islam on his return. The Dutch, who were not consulted on the matter, feared that the choice of ruler might strengthen the Spanish who occupied a number of forts on Ternate and its neighbor Tidore since 1606. They would rather have seen his forceful brother Kapita Laut Ali, the sea lord, as the new Sultan. Eventually they accepted the decision of the council, however. Though fluent in Spanish and educated by Jesuit fathers, he openly denounced his former Spanish protectors, and never seems to have seriously plotted to place Maluku under the sway of Manila during his reign. He was nevertheless regarded as an extremely cunning and ambivalent figure who operated between Spanish and Dutch interests.

== Attempts to strengthen the realm ==
Opinions about the personality of Hamza were divided, as he was variously described as "gentle and discreet" or tyrannical. He certainly worked to strengthen the center of the kingdom by forced migrations. Christians from Moro Halmahera were forced to settle in Malayu on Ternate Island, and people from Loloda were moved to Jailolo, opposite Ternate. He also strengthened his position at the cost of the Jogugu (first minister) and the Kapita Laut Ali, who was sent on an expedition to reaffirm Ternate's power in Sulawesi and Buton, and died en route in 1632 or 1633. He also sent expeditions to curb his formal vassals, the autonomous leaders in West Ceram and Hitu in Ambon, during the 1640s. Ambon was a very important center for clove production, and the chiefs were not easily brought to obedience. The dissatisfied Ambonese asked the King of Gowa (Makassar) to be their protector. Hamza in turn called for Dutch assistance to curb the rebellion. All this formed part of the notorious Ambon Wars where the VOC troops crushed all opposition with enormous loss of life. Hamza was less lucky in North Sulawesi where the gold-rich Gorontalo refused to obey him. An expedition in 1647 achieved nothing, and the vague Ternatan claim once again had to be backed up with VOC support. In spite of the Sultan's efforts, the territory shrank drastically in these decades due to the great expansion of Makassar. By 1636 the King of Gowa had replaced Ternate as the overlord in Buton, Banggai, Tobungku, Menado and Buru.

Hamza also intervened in the affairs of Ternate's traditional rival, Tidore, which was still allied to Spain. Sultan Ngarolamo of Tidore was deposed in 1634 with Ternatan support and replaced with his cousin Sultan Gorontalo, who had lived in Ternate as Hamza's protégé. The VOC was not happy about Hamza's activism, since it was apparently just a way to increase royal Ternatan influence in the region, which could be detrimental to Dutch interests. Hamza allowed the deposed monarch to stay in Ternate, where his daughter was married to Hamza. Some years later, however, he saw it that Ngarolamo was murdered when there were doubts about his sincerity. Meanwhile, the Spanish in turn murdered Sultan Gorontalo in 1639, and Tidore remained allied with them until 1663.

== Death ==
Hamza, already old by the standards of the time, died in May 1648. After being a practitioner of Islam for decades, he still, according to the rumours, invoked Catholic saints at his deathbed. He left no sons in spite of his numerous marriages. He was succeeded by Mudafar Syah's son Mandar Syah His attempts to centralize his realm were apparently inspired by his Spanish background, since the policy of colonial rule in the Philippines was to exercise direct control over the territories. The resources of the Ternate center were nevertheless too limited and fragile to uphold the extensive realm efficiently. The solution was to ask for assistance from the VOC when needed, which tied Ternate closer to Dutch colonial governance.

== Family ==
Sultan Hamza had several wives and co-wives:

- A daughter of the King of Mindanao (Maguindanao?), married in 1603
- A daughter of the Sangaji of Kayoa
- A woman from Sahu (Halmahera), married 1623
- A daughter of Sultan Ngarolamo of Tidore, married 1635, died 1642
- A daughter of Raja Luhu from Hoamoal (West Ceram), married 1638
- A woman from Makian, married 1643 or 1644

From all these marriages, only one child came forth:

- A daughter, born by the Tidore princess 1642

== See also ==
- List of rulers of Maluku
- Sultanate of Ternate
- Tidore Sultanate

Hamza of Ternate
Preceded by Mudafar Syah I	Sultan of Ternate; 1627–1648	Succeeded by Mandar Syah
