= Mandar Syah =

Sultan Mandar Syah
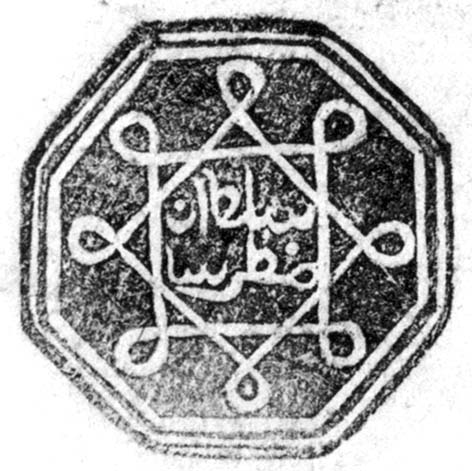
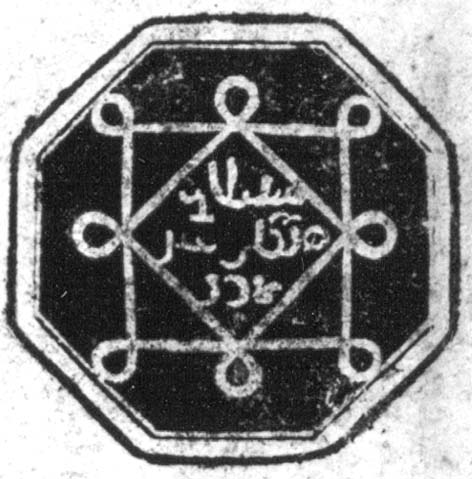
- Seals of Sultan Mandar Syah

Sultan of Ternate
- Reign: 1648–1675
- Predecessor: Hamza
- Successor: Sibori Amsterdam
- Born: c. 1625
- Died: 3 January 1675
- Father: Mudafar Syah I
- Religion: Islam

Sultan Mandar Syah (Jawi: سلطان منظر شاه; c. 1625—3 January 1675) was the 11th Sultan of Ternate who reigned from 1648 to 1675. Like his predecessors he was heavily dependent on the Dutch East India Company (VOC), and was forced to comply to Dutch demands to extirpate spice trees in his domains, ensuring Dutch monopoly of the profitable spice trade. During the Great Ambon War in the 1650s, Mandar Syah sided with the VOC but was nevertheless pushed to cede control over areas in Central Maluku. On the other hand, the Ternate-VOC alliance led to a large increase of Ternatan territory in the war with Makassar in 1667.

== Accession ==
Kaicili (prince) Tahubo, the later Mandar Syah, was only a few years old when his father Sultan Mudafar Syah I died in 1627. He had two older brothers, Kaicili Kalamata and Kaicili Manilha, and was therefore not a likely candidate for the Ternatan throne. An older kinsman, Hamza ruled as Sultan from 1627 to 1648 when he died without sons. Now the grandees of the kingdom wanted Manilha to be their new ruler, while Muslim clerics preferred Kalamata. However, the VOC, whose influence in the affairs of Ternate was on the rise, insisted that the youngest brother Tahubo should be installed since he had been raised under the supervision of the Dutch governors in Ternate. The Ternatan elite was less than pleased, and so Tahubo, who took the title Sultan Mandar Syah, was even more dependent on Dutch goodwill than his two predecessors. His Dutch leanings can be seen from the names that he gave a few of his sons: Prince Amsterdam, Prince Rotterdam.

== The rebellion of Manilha ==
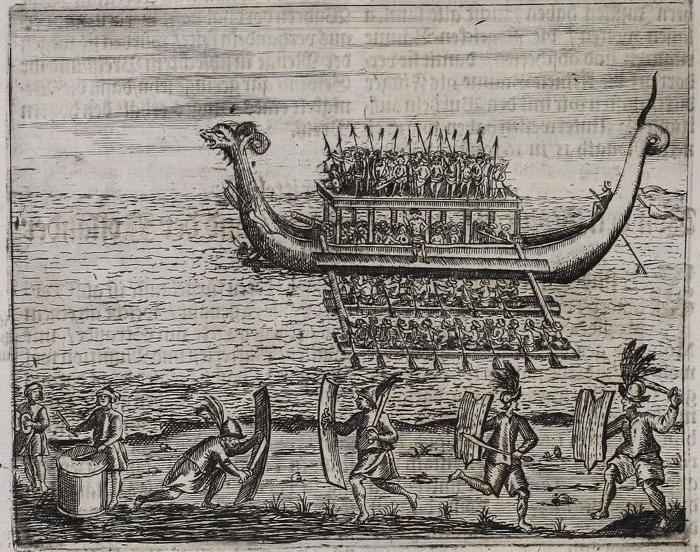
A korakora (large outrigger) from Maluku, and soldiers performing cakalele (war dance), 1669.

Dissatisfaction with Mandar Syah's dependence on the Company soon led to open opposition from the influential four prominent houses of Fala Raha and the various Bobatos (chiefs) of Ternate. In August 1650 they elected his brother Manilha, supposedly a mentally unstable person, as Sultan in opposition. They believed that Manilha would be more sensible to Ternatan community leaders. Mandar Syah had to flee from his residence and seek refuge in the Dutch fort in Ternate. The attempt soon faltered, since the Dutch were not ready to abandon their candidate. The former governor of Ambon, Arnold de Vlamingh van Oudshoorn turned up in Maluku in 1651 to restore order. Manilha maintained his claim and kept his residence in Jailolo on the west coast of Halmahera. The other brother Kalamata, an able figure and an expert in Islamic law, joined him there in 1652, but then proclaimed himself sultan in defiance of Manilha and Mandar Syah. In January 1653 the two pretenders were nevertheless forced to yield to Mandar Syah when a Dutch force turned up off Halmahera. Kalamata, however, continued to create trouble for the Dutch during the coming years. Another inveterate enemy of the Dutch was the Kapita Laut (sea lord), Prince Saidi, who was excepted from Dutch pardon for the rebels.

== The Great Ambon War ==
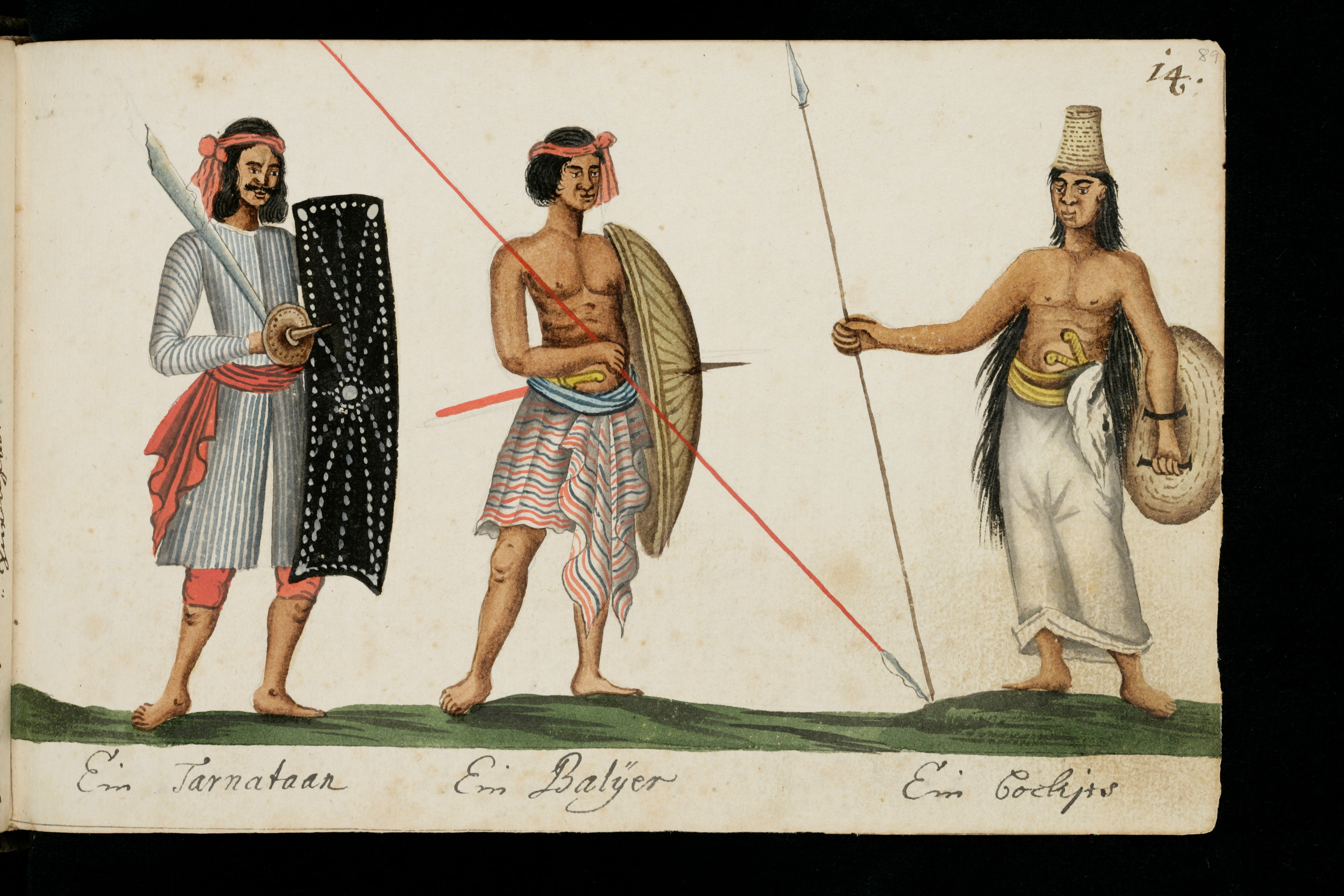
Soldiers of Ternate, Bali and the Bugis lands (Sulawesi) in the 17th century.

Anti-Dutch opposition also spread to the Hoamoal Peninsula in West Ceram which was a dependency of Mandar Syah and was ruled by members of the Ternatan Tomagola clan, a division of the Houses of Fala Raha. The kimelaha (governor) Majira had previously been helpful in suppressing the rebels of Hitu in Ambon, but now saw his position undermined by the stern and tactless Arnold de Vlamingh van Oudshoorn. Majira and Prince Saidi colluded with each other and induced the locals to attack and destroy VOC posts in the islands. This was the beginning of the Great Ambon War (1651-1656). De Vlamingh fought the rebels in the Ambon Quarter with efficient ruthlessness while pushing Mandar Syah to give up his rights in Hoamoal and surrounding islands in 1652-53. The strong rebel fortress Loki in Ceram was captured by a VOC force which broke much of the power of Majira. However, in 1652-53 the King of Makassar intervened by dispatching a fleet of 40 warships to back up the rebel positions. Makassar was a political rival of both Ternate and the VOC and strove to weaken their power in eastern Indonesia. The Makassarese fortified themselves in Asahudi on the north-western coast of Ceram. In the next year they were reinforced by another fleet, but in the meantime De Vlamingh assembled a major force to wipe out his opponents. A Dutch-Ternatan-Ambonese force of 40 kora-koras (large outriggers) and 23 Company vessels attacked the Makassarese, Ternatan and Hoamoalese resistance fighters in 1654. Asahudi was conquered in July 1655. In the aftermath of the fighting Prince Saidi was captured and gruesomely executed while Majira disappeared and seemingly escaped to Makassar. Mandar Syah's brother Kalamata, who fought on the rebel side, also sought refuge in Makassar where he died in 1676. The final stages of the war furthermore cost the lives of the Sultan of Bacan, who was kept among the rebel against his will, and the Raja of Jailolo, who was captured and slain by the vengeful Dutch. As Makassar concluded peace with the VOC, the rebellion petered out during 1656, although fighting continued on Buru Island until 1658. Hoamaol was depopulated as 12,000 inhabitants, Muslims, Christians and others, were forcibly moved to Ambon. It had been an extremely bloody affair that finally ensured total Dutch control over the clove-producing Ambon Quarter. After the war, cloves were only cultivated in Ambon, Haruku, Saparua and Nusalaut.

== Extirpation of clove trees ==
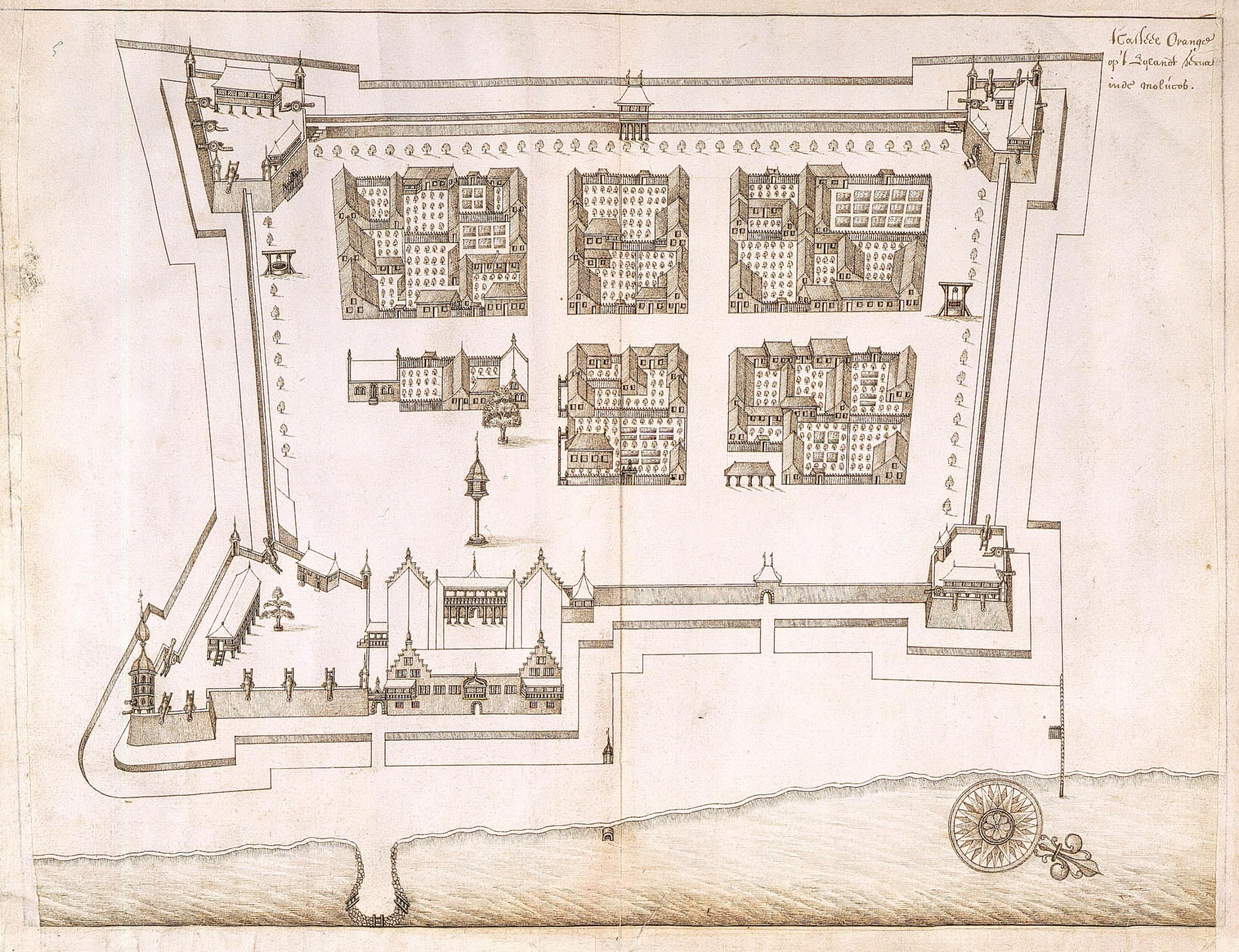
Map from c. 1651 showing Fort Oranje on Ternate where Mandar Syah took refuge from the rebels.

Apart from the rebellions, the selling of spices to merchants operating outside the VOC was a problem for the Dutch authorities, who deemed such practices "smuggling". The solution was to force the periphery areas in Maluku to stop producing spices. Here Mandar Syah was a useful tool to enforce Dutch spice monopoly. A treaty with the Sultan was signed on 31 July 1652. Mandar Syah agreed to allow the destruction of all clove trees in Ternate while the Ternatan governorship of the dependencies in the Ambon Quarter was abrogated. In return, the Sultan received an annual sum (recognitiepenningen) of 12,000 rijksdaalders. Some of this money was to be allocated to the various Bobatos. In practice, this became a way for the Sultan to keep the Bobatos in check since those showing signs of disobedience had their subsidies withdrawn. This differed from the old system where the Bobatos kept incomes from the clove trade for the needs of their own community (soa). Similar contracts were concluded with the other sultanates Bacan (1653) and Tidore (1657). The Company and the Sultans upheld the monopoly by means of regular expeditions, hongitochten, that cruised the islands and destroyed any spice tree that was found. Such hongitochten were conducted until the 19th century and gained notoriety for brutality.

== Political gains ==
The rise of the Makassar Kingdom in the first half of the 17th century had grave consequences for the Sultanate of Ternate. Large areas such as Buton, Banggai, Tobungku, Menado, Sula and Buru fell away from Ternatan overlordship. Here, the growing power of the VOC turned out to be advantageous. Ternate supported the VOC expedition to Makassar in 1667 with a small force. Makassar was crushed with the help of the Bugis leader Arung Palakka and forced to sign the Treaty of Bongaya in the same year. One of the stipulations was that Ternate regained its old vassals in Sulawesi and adjacent islands. Another political rival, the Tidore Sultanate, left its traditional alliance with Spain and made contracts with the VOC in 1657 and 1667, which for the moment put an end to the long history of Ternatan-Tidorese rivalries and petty wars. In 1663, Spain abandoned its forts in Tidore and Gammalamo in southern Ternate which it had held since 1606.

The legacy of Sultan Mandar Syah was therefore ambivalent: on one hand close dependency on the VOC, but on the other hand a strengthening of the Sultan's own powers at the expense of officials and chiefs, and a dramatic increase in territory. These contradiction would lead to open anti-Dutch rebellion under his son Sibori Amsterdam who succeeded him in 1675.

== Family ==
Sultan Mandar Syah married the following wives and co-wives:

- A daughter of Sultan Saidi of Tidore (possibly merely engaged)
- A princess of Buton
- Maya from Ternate, mother of Boki Mahir
- Lawa, mother of Amsterdam, Malayu, Mauludu and Sarabu
- Maryam from Sahu, mother of Rotterdam and Boki Gogugu
- Ainun, mother of Toloko
- A Makassarese woman, mother of Neman
- A Gorontalese woman, mother of Hukum and Diojo

His sons (Kaicili, princes) and daughters (Boki, princesses) were:

- Boki Mahir Gammalamo
- Kaicili Sibori Amsterdam, Sultan of Ternate
- Kaicili Malayu
- Boki Mauludu
- Boki Sarabu
- Kaicili Rotterdam alias Yena
- Boki Gogugu
- Kaicili Toloko, Sultan of Ternate
- Kaicili Neman
- Kaicili Hukum
- Boki Diojo
- Boki Timonga
- Boki Tabilo

== See also ==
- List of rulers of Maluku
- Sultanate of Ternate
- Tidore Sultanate

Mandar Syah
Preceded by Hamza	Sultan of Ternate; 1648–1675	Succeeded by Sibori Amsterdam
