= Jailolo =

Stratovolcanic complex in Indonesia

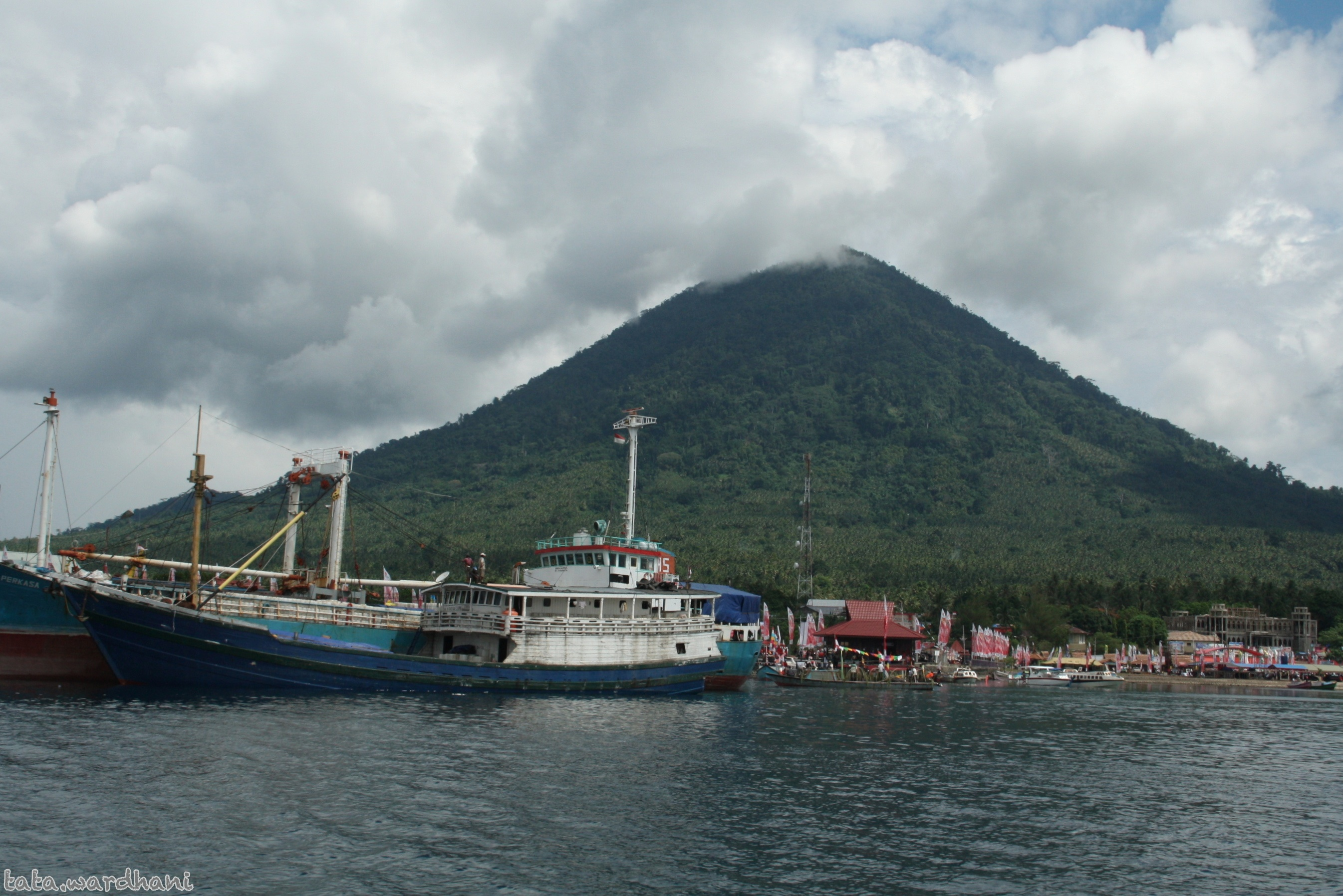
- Jailolo Bay and Jailolo volcano

Highest point
- Elevation: 1,130 m (3,710 ft)
- Coordinates: 1.08°N 127.42°E

Geography
- Location: Halmahera, Indonesia

Geology
- Mountain type: stratovolcano
- Last eruption: unknown

Jailolo is a stratovolcanic complex on a peninsula (Jailolo Bay), west of Halmahera island. It has lava flows on the eastern flank, a small caldera at the west and south-west sides of the mountain, and hot springs along the north-west coast of the caldera. This small volcanic island was formed by the Kailupa cone, off the southern coast of the peninsula.

== See also ==
- List of volcanoes in Indonesia
