= Mole Majimu =

Mole Majimun

Sultan of Tidore
- Reign: 1599-1627
- Predecessor: Gapi Baguna
- Successor: Ngarolamo
- Died: 23 May 1627
- Father: Gava of Tidore
- Mother: Ternate princess
- Religion: Islam

Mole Majimun (Jawi: مولي مجيمو; d. 23 May 1627) was the seventh Sultan of Tidore in Maluku Islands, who reigned from 1599 to 1627. He was also known as Sultan Jumaldin (سلطان جمال الدين) or Kaicili Mole (کچيل مولي). In his time the transition to the hegemony of the Dutch East India Company (VOC) began in eastern Indonesia, though Tidore held on to its traditional alliance with the Spanish Empire.

== Ascent to the throne ==
Kaicili (prince) Mole was, according to the contemporary chronicler Bartolomé Leonardo de Argensola, a son of Sultan Gava. His mother was a daughter of Sultan Hairun of Ternate. Gava was treacherously murdered by the Sultan of Ternate when Mole was a child. His uncle Gapi Baguna then ruled Tidore during several decades, marked by a strategical alliance with the Spanish and Portuguese. In that way Tidore was able to hold its own against the powerful Ternate. The strong Iberian fortress on Tidore Island, Os Reys Magos, deterred Ternatan attacks while the rest of Maluku and parts of Sulawesi fell under Ternate's might. By 1584 Kaicili Mole was the heir of his uncle and already a medium-aged person. When Gapi Baguna died in April 1599 a succession crisis nevertheless occurred. Two candidates for the throne were brought forward by Ternate but were killed in succession. A half-brother of Mole called Kaicili Kota was considered the legitimate heir since he was born from Gava's main consort or Putri. However, he had leanings towards Ternate and Mole was therefore enthroned. According to Argensola he was bent on revenge against Ternate because of his father's violent death. In spite of being sidelined, Kaicili Kota served his brother loyally as an envoy to Manila.

== Spanish conquest of Maluku ==
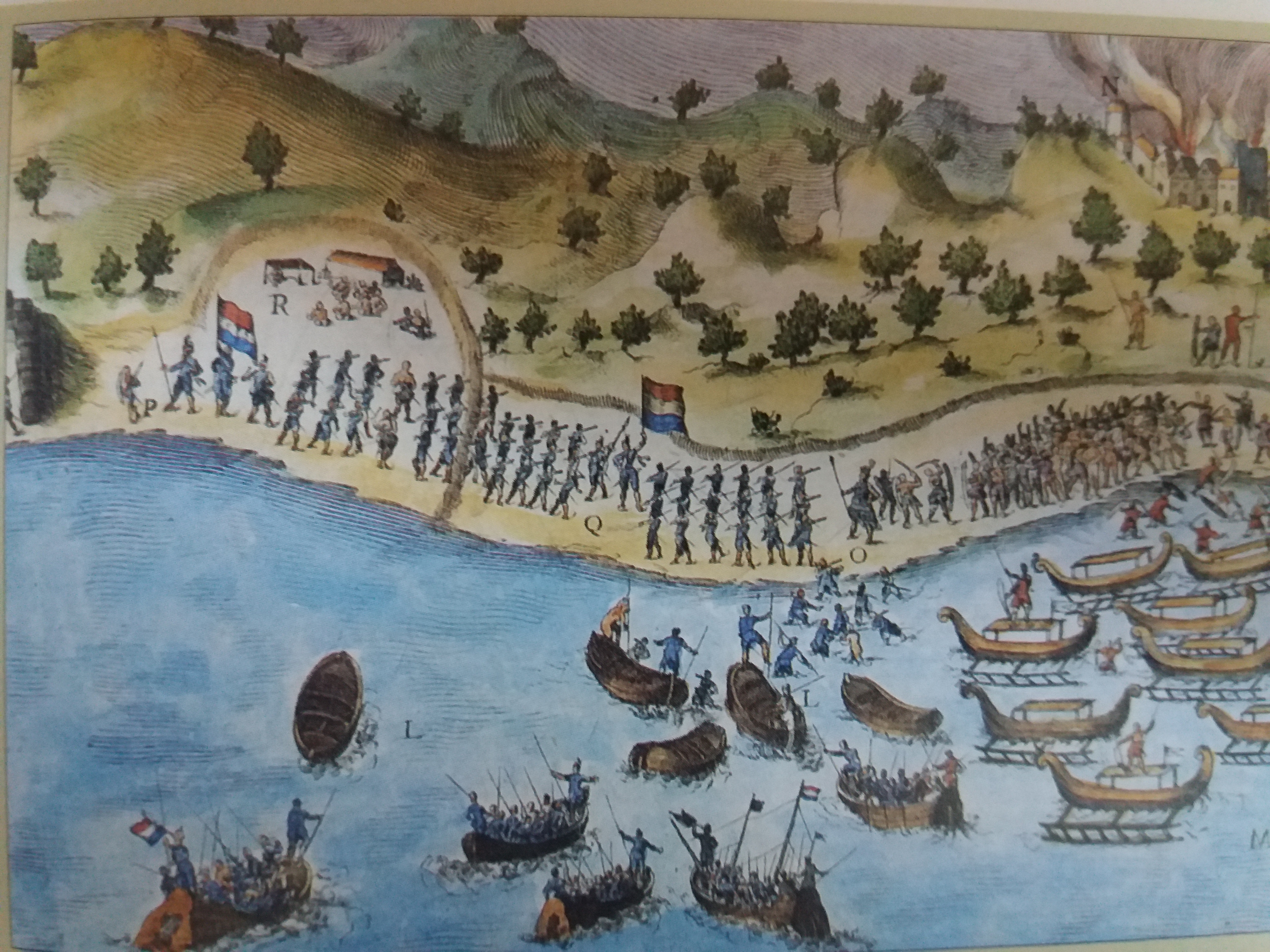
The Dutch and Ternatans invade Tidore in 1605, illustration from India Orientalis (1607). Sultan Saidi Berkat stands at the place marked 'O'.

The Dutch, arch-rivals of the Spanish, showed up in Ternate in 1599 to partake in the clove trade. Three years later the Dutch East India Company was constituted, whose efficiency the Spanish could hardly match. An expedition equipped in the Spanish Philippines sailed down to Maluku in 1603 and tried to invest Ternate. The siege was a complete failure, and the Spanish accused Sultan Mole of betraying his allies. Allying with Sultan Saidi Berkat of Ternate, the Dutch in turn attacked and captured Fort Os Reys Magos in 1605, after having first conquered the important center of clove cultivation Ambon. At this time Tidore was considered the third largest producer of cloves with 900 Bahar (c. 245,8 metric tons) per year, and therefore held considerable economic importance in the region.

The loss of Maluku immediately alerted the Spanish governor Pedro Bravo de Acuña who dispatched a new fleet in 1606. This time the Spaniards were entirely successful. Mole contributed with a fleet of korakoras (outriggers) manned with 600 men and a successful landing was made on Ternate. Sultan Saidi Berkat was forced to capitulate, while the Spanish groomed Mole and "made this king, who had always been our friend, emperor of those islands" Mole took over or received back a number of territories previously held by Ternate, such as parts of Makian, Mayu island, and a section of Morotai. He also secured friendly ties with the Sultan Alauddin II of Bacan in the south of Maluku Proper by marrying his daughter.

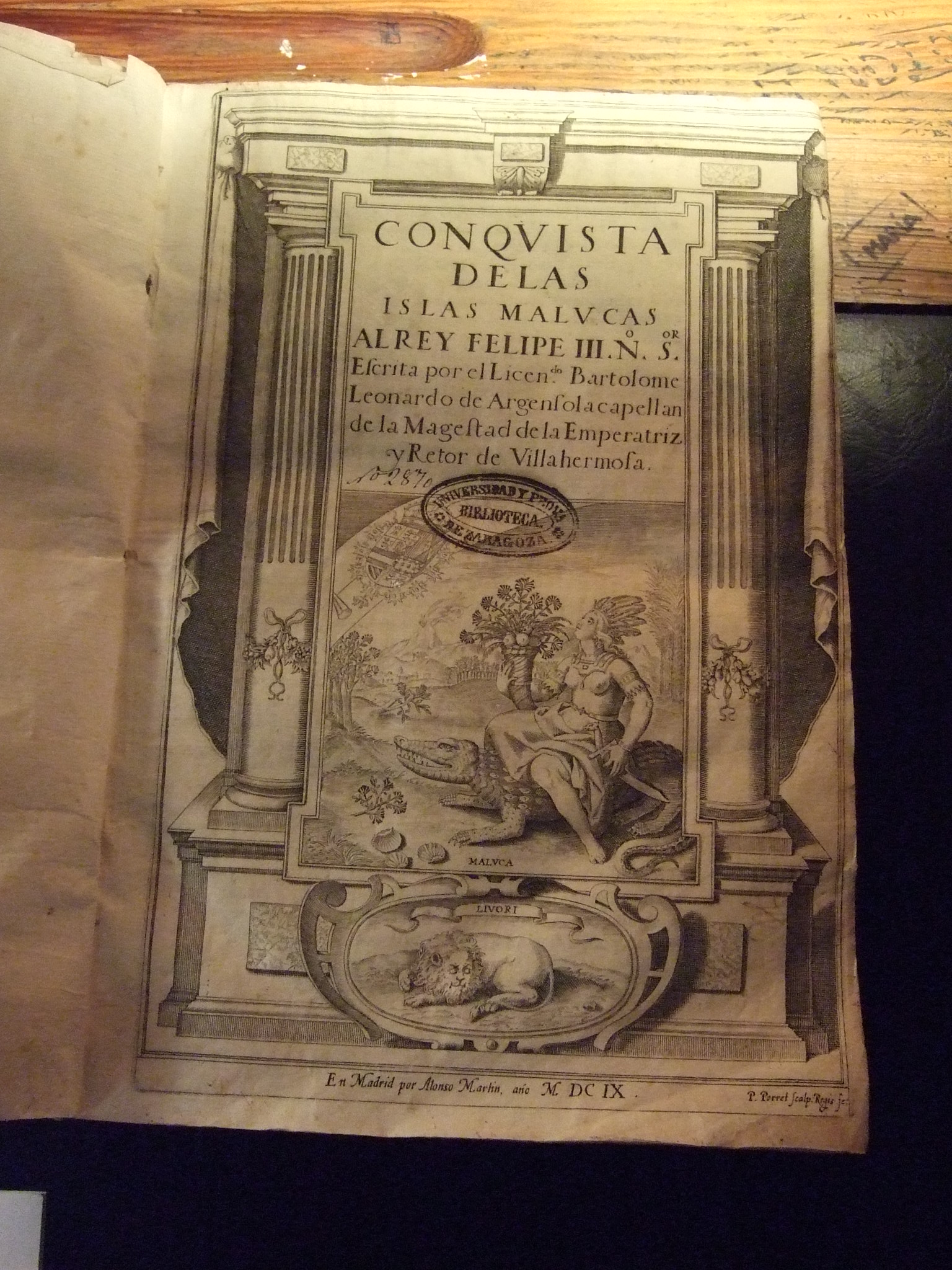
Frontispiece of Bartolomé Leonardo de Argensola's Conquista de las Islas Malucas that celebrated the Spanish-Tidorese invasion of Ternate in 1606.

== The VOC returns ==
In fact the new Spanish-Tidorese hegemony was of short duration. Already in 1607 a Dutch fleet appeared in North Maluku and made a treaty with the new Sultan of Ternate. A fort was constructed in Ternate so that the island was divided into a Spanish and a VOC-allied sphere. In 1613 the allies joined forces to invade Tidore in order to push out the Spanish, strengthened by Japanese mercenaries. The Ternatan Sultan explicitly told the Dutch of his intention to capture Mole and finishing him off with a sword. The VOC forces quickly overwhelmed the Spanish fort at Marieko after a tenacious battle where the wounded Spaniards were disposed of per el filo de l'espada. Mole preferred not to intervene in the fight, but the allies proceeded to attack the royal settlement. However, they were now in turn defeated by a determined Tidorese troop armed with muskets, shields and swords and had to withdraw. In the next year 1614, the allies struck again and two more Spanish fortresses in Tidore were captured. However, the Iberians could not be expelled from Tidore, nor from their main fort Gammalamo in Ternate. In the same year Tidorese fleets of korakoras slew the VOC-affiliated regent of Bacan and raided Morotai.

The Dutch presence on Tidore Island was moreover shortlived as Marieko was eventually abandoned by the VOC in 1621. The inconclusive results of the invasions made for an uneasy balance between Tidore and Ternate and their respective European allies that lasted for several decades. The VOC constantly admonished the Ternatan allies to keep pressure on the Tidorese and was keen to prevent attempts by the two spice Sultanates to make peace. In that way the traditional rivalry between Tidore and Ternate became a war by proxy where the two were treated as pawns in a global game for power. In this the VOC became increasingly dominant in Maluku as they defeated English attempts to establish bases in the region, as well as recalcitrant indigenous polities.

Although he hang on to his vassalage to the Spanish king and was said to be a friend of the Portuguese, Mole himself was not entirely appreciated by the Spanish authorities in Manila. As an author had it, "his respect is fear and his love is selfishness". When anti-Spanish resistance broke out in Jailolo in Halmahera in the wake of the Spanish conquest, he reportedly made various excuses and pretexts to abstain from intervening. His policy of trying to conclude a separate peace with Ternate indicates that the Spanish alliance was more strategical than cordial.

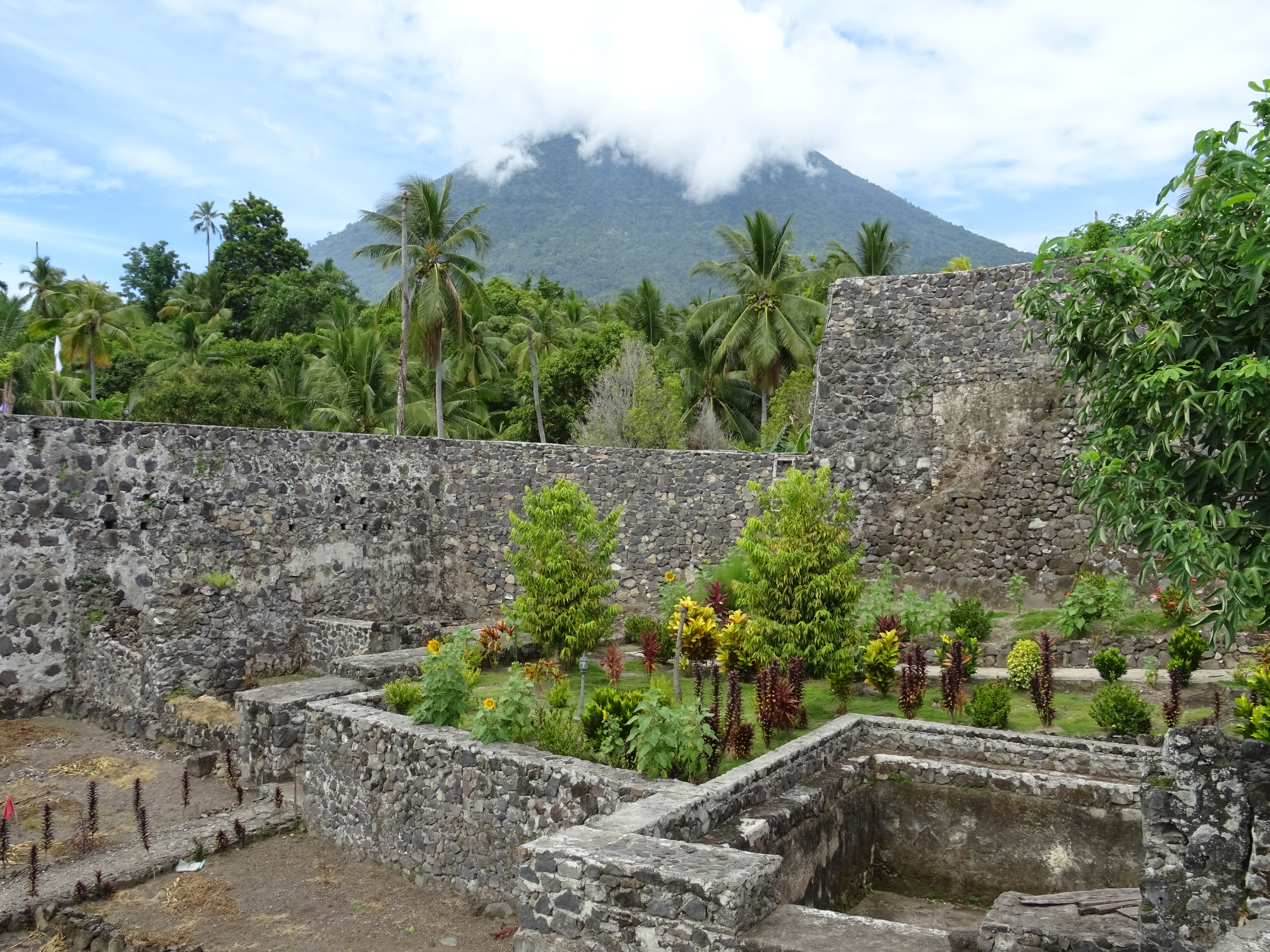
Fort Tahula, constructed in Mole Majimun's time.

From Mole's reign come the earliest explicit references to Tidore's relation with the lands of the Papuans. The Bacan Sultanate had previously made claims to Papua, but in the early 17th century it had shrunk to insignificance. By c. 1600 many boats from New Guinea visited Tidore where the Portuguese commented on the Papuans' physical appearance in partly approving terms. Gold, silver and pearls could purportedly be obtained from the Papuan Islands. A Muslim cleric likewise told a Dutch official in 1622 that "the King of Tidore use to obtain gold from the Papuans". While the rumours of gold might be exaggerated, this indicates that the Sultan already had interests in Western New Guinea or Raja Ampat. Other documents indicate that Papua was seen as a hub of slave trade by the Tidore elite by this time.

== Death ==
Sultan Mole Majimun died on 23 May 1627 at a very advanced age. In spite of the official state of war, Ternate sent a customary burial gift, but the envoy was arrested since a Ternatan prince had recently attacked a ship sent by the King of Makassar to his Tidorese counterpart. By this time the royal clan had split into two competing lineages. His son Ngarolamo was reportedly accepted as heir more due to respect for Mole than for any affection on the part of the populace, since he regularly slept with other persons' wives. By contrast, his nephew Kaicili Gorontalo was a popular figure who stayed with the Sultan of Ternate and was considered the more legitimate heir. As it was, Ngarolamo managed to secure the throne although he would loose it after a brief reign.

== See also ==
- List of rulers of Maluku
- Spice trade
- Tidore Sultanate
- Sultanate of Ternate
- Sultanate of Bacan

Mole Majimu
Preceded by Gapi Baguna	Sultan of Tidore; 1599-1627	Succeeded by Ngarolamo
