= Gava of Tidore =

Gava

Sultan of Tidore
- Reign: 1550s-1560
- Predecessor: Mir
- Successor: Gapi Baguna
- Died: c. 1560
- Religion: Islam

Gava (c. 1525/30 - c. 1560) was a Sultan of Tidore in Maluku Islands who ruled briefly in the years up to 1560. His fairly obscure reign was characterized by an attempt to expand Tidore's territory in Halmahera which ended with his violent demise at the hands of his rival, the Sultan of Ternate.

== Reign ==
The former Sultan of Tidore, Mir, passed away some time in the 1550s. In the late 1550s the kingdom was ruled by a younger Sultan whose name is not mentioned in the contemporary sources. His fate was entangled with that of the neighbouring kingdom and rival Ternate, where the Portuguese made themselves increasingly hated. The alliance between Sultan Hairun of Ternate and the Christian Europeans broke down in 1557, since Captain Duarte d'Eça brusquely arrested Hairun and his brother Kaicili Gujarati, when the Sultan opposed the Portuguese appropriation of cloves from the Ternatan vassal Makian. As a result an anti-Portuguese revolt broke out, and the discontented chiefs allied with the Sultan of Tidore, who was a son-in-law of Hairun, in order to besiege the Portuguese in their fortress. The Tidore ruler took the opportunity to take over some territories in Maluku that otherwise stood under Ternate. He played mayhem in northern Halmahera and many local Christians lost their lives. In his desperation, Duarte d'Eça turned to the other Malukan realms, Bacan and Jailolo for assistance, and got some. As he consistently refused to release Hairun against all advice, his Portuguese associates finally deposed him and set the Sultan free. An agreement was made in 1560 where Hairun acknowledged the authority of the King of Portugal.

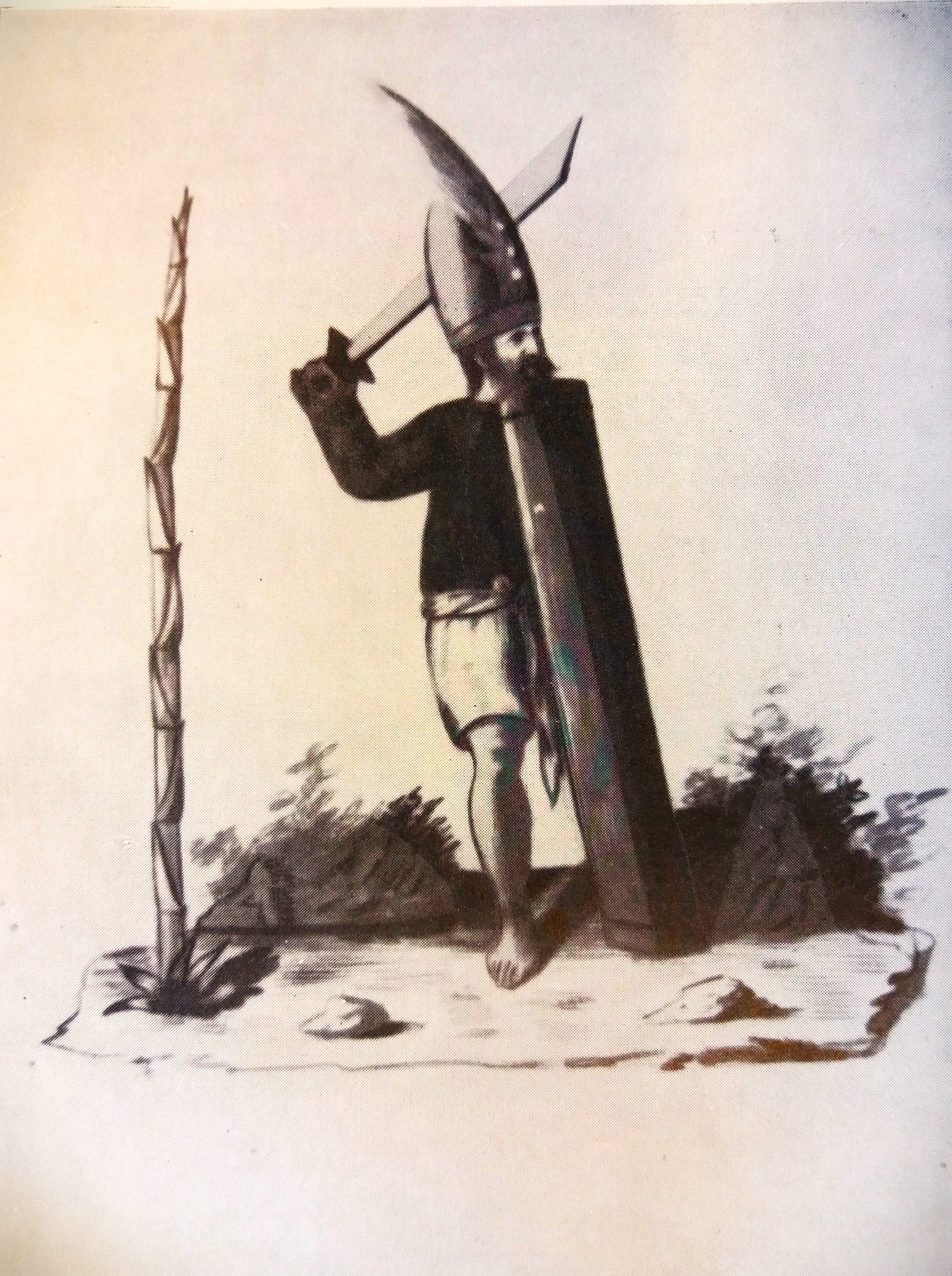
A soldier in Maluku in c. 1560, illustration from a manuscript by Gabriel Rebello

== Death ==
In return, the Portuguese forces helped Hairun to win back territories from Tidore. Especially the fortified place Tolo in northern Halmahera was tenaciously defended by the Tidorese, headed by a cousin of the Sultan. After a siege lasting four months, costing large mutual losses it was finally taken by the Portuguese and Ternatans. Now the Sultan of Tidore was forced to sue for peace. Since he felt too ashamed to make peace in own name, he abdicated, less than 35 years old, to a younger brother (hum irmão mais moço), though he remained governor (regidor) of the kingdom. In that way he yielded to Hairun. However, according to Jesuit sources, he was invited to Ternate Island in order to ratify the agreement. Hairun received him in the vicinity of the Portuguese fort, but then treacherously seized and beheaded him without the Portuguese officers daring to intervene, or even with their complicity.

Portuguese sailors who met their Spanish rivals in Cebu in the Philippines in 1567 told them that "your [Spanish] Majesty’s old-time vassals, the kings of Tidore and Jailolo, have been killed and persecuted by the Portuguese and by the king of Ternate their friend and confederate. They killed the king of Tidore, and destroyed a fort which the king of Jailolo possessed, who died while being pursued. The king of Ternate had the latter’s son who succeeded him in his kingdom killed; while the son of the king of Tidore who is yet living, pays a yearly and very excessive tribute of one hundred bahars or more than five hundred quintals of cloves to the Portuguese. In addition, the vassals of those kings are greatly harassed and troubled by the Portuguese and by the king of Ternate his friend". This account partly differs from other contemporary sources, since the "old-time vassal" of Spain (before 1546) was the previous ruler Mir.

== Identity ==
The Spanish chronicler Bartolomé Leonardo de Argensola, in his chronologically unreliable Conquista de las Islas Molucas (1609), says that the name of the ruler who was assassinated at the state visit was Cachil Gava (Kaicili Gawa or similar). Argensola evidently misdates the event to c. 1583 and is unsure under what Ternatan Sultan the deed took place. His brother and successor was, according to Argensola, Gapi Baguna, who had a long reign up to 1599. However, Gava left two children: Kaicili Kota, who was born from his principal wife or Putri, and Kaicili Mole who much later succeeded to the throne.

Later king lists mention Kië Mansur alias Ghissi, and Iskandar Sani Amiril Madlemi alias Tadu, as successors of Mir and predecessors of Gapi Baguna. These names are not found in contemporary or near-contemporary sources, who seldom provide names for the Tidore rulers.

== See also ==
- List of rulers of Maluku
- Spice trade
- Tidore Sultanate
- Sultanate of Ternate

Gava of Tidore
Preceded by Mir	Sultan of Tidore; 1550s-1560	Succeeded by Gapi Baguna
