= Ternate expedition (1582) =

- Part of Ternatean–Portuguese conflicts
Date	1582
Location	Ternate, Moluccas
Result	Ternatean victory

Belligerents
Spanish Empire: Philippines	Sultanate of Ternate

Commanders and leaders
Sebastian Ronquillo	Babullah of Ternate

Strength
1,800	Unknown

Casualties and losses
1,200 dead	Unknown

The Ternate expedition was a military expedition by Spain to establish rule over the Maluku Islands. The expedition failed and was Spain's first attempt to seize the Malukus.

== Background ==
In 1582, the Spanish governor of Philippines, Gonzalo Ronquillo de Peñalosa, was ordered by the Spanish king, Philip II, to seize the Maluku Islands and other Portuguese areas and establish the Spanish authority there. An expedition was launched with a force of 300 Spaniards and 1,500 Filipinos. The command was given to the governor's nephew, Sebastian Ronquillo.

== Battle ==
The expedition left Manilla and first sailed to Borneo then Ternate. Sebastian took Pablo de Lima, who was married to the niece of the King of Tidor, and appointed him to be the governor of Ternate. The Spaniards proceeded to Ternate, where the Ternateans were determined to resist the Spanish landing, but their resistance was short as they were forced to retreat to their fort. The Spaniards began erecting artillery and bombarded the walls but to no avail. The Spaniards then laid a regular siege. However, a Beri-Beri epidemic broke out in the camp which wiped out two-thirds of the men, forcing Sebastian to raise the blockade and sail to Manilla.

== Sources ==
- Zaide, Gregorio F. (1957). Philippine political and cultural history. Manila: Philippine Education Co.
- Martínez de Zúñiga, Joaquín (1814). An Historical View of the Philippine Islands. Vol. I. Black, Parry, and Company.
- Sawyer, Frederic Henry Read (1900). The Inhabitants of the Philippines. S. Low, Marston.
