= Gapi Baguna =

Sultan of Tidore
- Reign: 1560–1599
- Predecessor: Gava
- Successor: Mole Majimu
- Died: 29 April 1599
- Religion: Islam

Sultan Gapi Baguna (Jawi: سلطان ݢاڤي بݢون; c. 1547 – 29 April 1599), also known as Sirajul Arifin (سراج العارفين), was the sixth Sultan of Tidore in Maluku Islands. He reigned from 1560 to 1599, a time of major political realignments. Due to the great expansion of Tidore's rival Ternate, the previous Tidorese hostility towards the Portuguese was changed into a strategic policy of cooperation, while the Spanish establishment in the Philippines and the Iberian Union in 1581 brought him Spanish support.

== Background ==
The family background of Gapi Baguna is somewhat obscure. Tidore king lists say that he succeeded a Sultan called Iskandar Sani who does not occur in the 16th-century sources. According to the Spanish historian Bartolomé Leonardo de Argensola (1609) he was instead the brother and successor of a Sultan called Gava who was murdered on a state visit to Ternate. Near-contemporary documents show that he was a cousin (primo) of Sultan Babullah of Ternate (r. 1570–1583) while Babullah's father Hairun (r. 1535–1570) was a brother-in-law (cunhado) of Sultan Mir of Tidore (r. 1526–1550s) and the maternal uncle of the Tidore Sultan in about 1570. Malukan chronicles say that Babullah's mother's sister, a Bacan princess, married a Tidore ruler (though this information may be chronologically confused).

According to the Jesuit historian Daniello Bartoli the Sultan of Ternate treacherously murdered his Tidore counterpart in about 1560. The contemporary chronicler Gabriel Rebello, on the other hand, says that the Sultan formally abdicated in favour of his junior brother at this time, and does not actually mention the murder. Argensola writes that the brother of the slain sultan was Gapi Baguna, who succeeded to the throne since Gava's own children were small. Unfortunately, contemporary Iberian sources seldom mention the names of the Tidore rulers. In 1564 the Sultan is described as a 17-years old boy with a favourable inclination towards Catholicism; Bartoli calls him Bungua. It has been suggested that Bungua is a form of (Gapi) Baguna, since Portuguese sources tend to render Indonesian names in a cavalier way. A cousin of the Sultan, who had commanded a campaign in Tolo on Halmahera in 1560 and been taken prisoner by Ternate, was converted by the Jesuits by this time. Two of Bungua's brothers and six prominent relatives likewise accepted baptism. The two regents for the young ruler were not happy about the missionary forays which could have disruptive effects, since Tidore was presently involved in warfare, and tried to dissuade the aristocrats from conversion, at least until the kingdom had stabilized.

== Break with Ternate ==
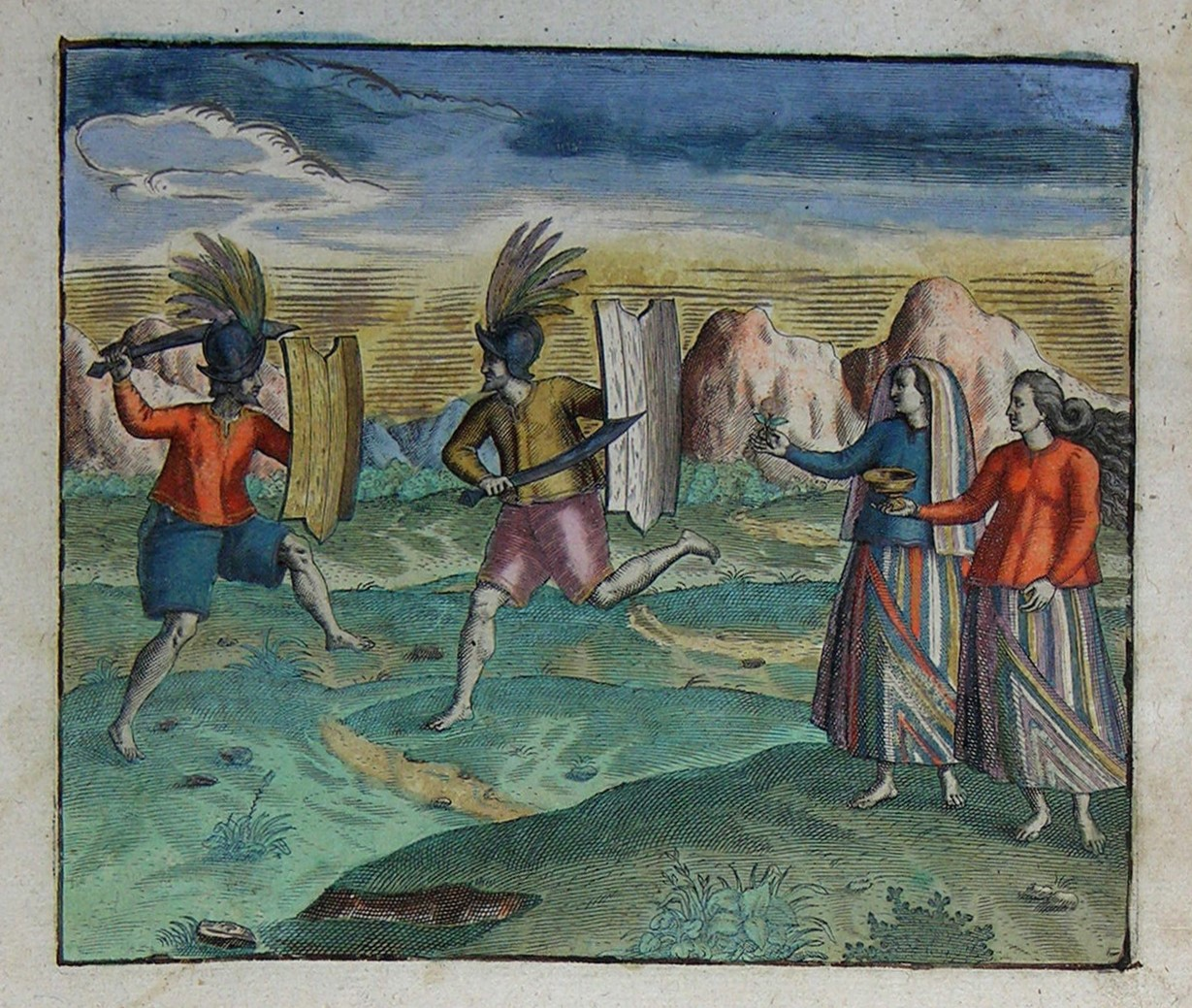
Malukan fencers at the time of the first Dutch visit in Maluku in 1599, at the end of Gapi Baguna's reign.

The murder of the Ternatan Sultan Hairun in 1570 at the hands of the Portuguese led to a general uprising against the white foreigners, who were besieged in their fortress in Ternate. The new Sultan Babullah initially cooperated with the Tidorese in confronting the Portuguese forces. Matrimonial relations played a role in the bond since a sister of Babullah married the Sultan in c. 1571. Tidore still had a very ambiguous position and actually provided the besieged Portuguese with provisions. In 1570 Babullah joined his fleet with that of the Tidore ruler who is here called Kaicili Bungua. The latter was shot through the leg in the sea battle against the Portuguese that followed. His valiant and strongly anti-Portuguese brother Tidore Wonge went out to support the inhabitants of the Banda Islands in 1574, but was killed in Ceram on the way, at the hands of the rash Ambon captain Sancho de Vasconcellos. The Portuguese in Ternate were eventually forced to capitulate in 1575. However, Gapi Baguna began to fear Babullah's growing power in Maluku, and realized that a European establishment could attract the profitable clove trade. In 1576 he took the decision to travel to Ambon where the Portuguese still had a post, for secret negotiations about a strategical alliance. Babullah nevertheless got wind of this and acted swiftly. When Gapi Baguna's small fleet of korakoras (outriggers) approached Tidore, it was surrounded by a large Ternatan fleet under the sea lord Rubohongi, who captured the Sultan.

The prisoner was kept under surveillance in Ternate, but in the meantime Tidore was ably governed by his brother Kaicili Kota (Alcazen). His sister Quisaira vowed to marry any person brave enough to liberate Gapi Baguna. A kinsman called Kaicili Salama (Çalama) took the challenge and set over to Ternate in the middle of the night with a group of followers, armed only with their krises. Salama managed to enter the complex where the prisoner was kept, since the guards were asleep. Waking him up, he offered the Sultan two alternatives: to dare an attempt to escape, or to be killed by his kris, since the Tidorese could not suffer to have an imprisoned ruler. Gapi Baguna chose the first alternative; the party managed to reach the seashore and rowed back to Tidore before the enemy could reach them. Argensola has a highly romanticized version of this, saying that Quisaira had actually hoped that a dashing Portuguese captain would have ventured to liberate the Sultan and thus marry her. When the captain made no objections to her marrying Salama, the resentful Quisaira inspired his nephew Roque Pinheiro to murder him under the promise that she would give herself to him. However, Salama in turn struck down Pinheiro and could then finally marry Quisaira with the approval of Gapi Baguna. This latter part of the story does not occur in the more accurate sources, though.

== The Portuguese fort ==
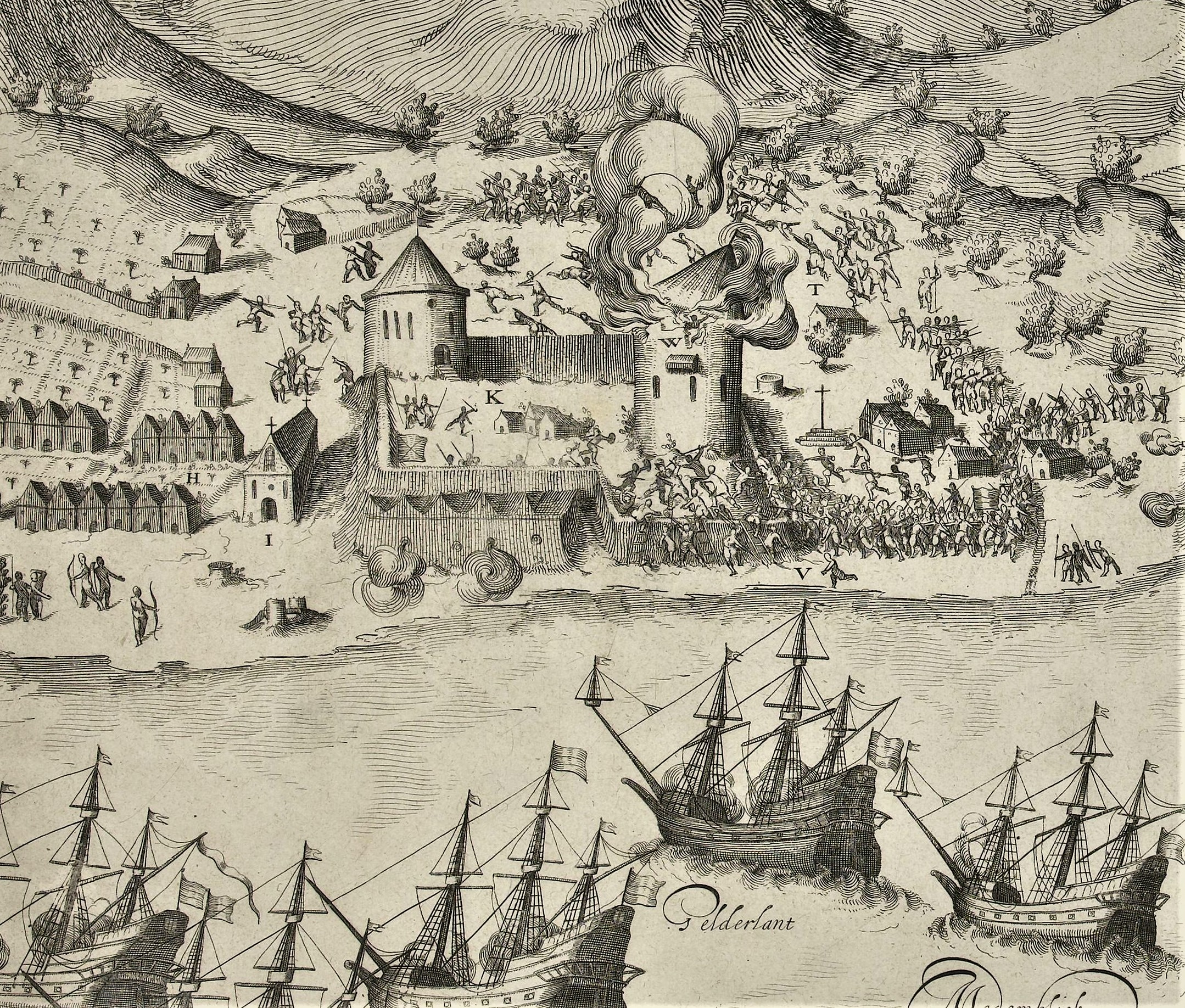
Fortaleza dos Reys Magos, built with the admission of Gapi Baguna in 1578, shown during a Dutch attack in 1605; from India Orientalis (1607).

Soon after the successful escape, a hundred Portuguese under Sancho de Vasconcellos arrived from Ambon in 1578 to construct a fort in Tidore, Fortaleza dos Reys Magos. Gapi Baguna henceforth delivered 100 bahar of cloves to the Europeans each year as pareas, a kind of tribute in exchange for military protection. Although Babullah had built up a vast maritime spice empire from Mindanao to Sulawesi to the Banda Islands, he made no effort to invade Tidore since the fortress, in spite of its modesty, was strong enough to withstand an attack by indigenous troops. He instead tried to persuade Gapi Baguna to desert the Portuguese under grand promises, but to no avail. The Portuguese grip on the spice trade was anyway broken, and a reason why they were able to stay on in Maluku was probably that their presence brought some commercial advantages to the Malukans.

The rift with Ternate was accompanied by attempts in the 1570s to expand the territory of the Sultanate. Though not always successful, the sea lord Kaicili Salama subjugated parts of eastern Ceram from Keffing to Waru. This was a commercially vital area that took in slaves and forest products from the Papuan Islands and New Guinea. That may be the origin of the Tidorese claims to the Papuan territories, which are documented in the 17th century and later.

== The Spanish-Portuguese Union and its consequences ==
The news of the Iberian Union between Spain and Portugal were received in Maluku in 1582, to the consternation of Babullah, who again vainly tried to ally with Gapi Baguna against the Europeans. The recent Spanish conquest of the Philippines made for a far more acute threat against Ternate and, conversely, opportunities for protection for Tidore. However, an Iberian attempt to invade Ternate from the Tidore base in the same year failed completely. After Babullah's death a few more Spanish expeditions were launched in 1584 and 1585 but they likewise miscarried. In general, the Portuguese in Maluku in the late 16th century were left to fend for themselves, as they could not count on assistance from either Goa or Manila. They could not prevent that some of Tidore's old vassals in Halmahera, Semola, Tofongo and Payahi, were captured by Ternate in a war around 1596. As a consequence, Tidore lost important suppliers of sago and other foodstuff.

While the Muslim Tidorese tolerated the Catholic Iberians for security reasons, there were sometimes mutual misunderstandings and petty conflicts. In 1597, for example, Gapi Baguna asked for a Christian tailor to come to the court so that he could measure him for a shirt, but then allegedly forced him to become a Muslim, to the consternation of the Portuguese captain. The Portuguese also complained of the Sultan's rude methods to extract gifts from them. He often cut off their lines of provisions "just to make clear that we will be here as long as he wants, and forcing the captains to give him more presents". A Catholic church was erected on Tidore after 1578, but no missionary activities took place since the two allies could not afford antagonizing each other. Gapi Baguna expressly forbade his subjects to convert to Christianity, or any preaching of the gospel to take place outside the Iberian premises.

== Abortive marriage project ==
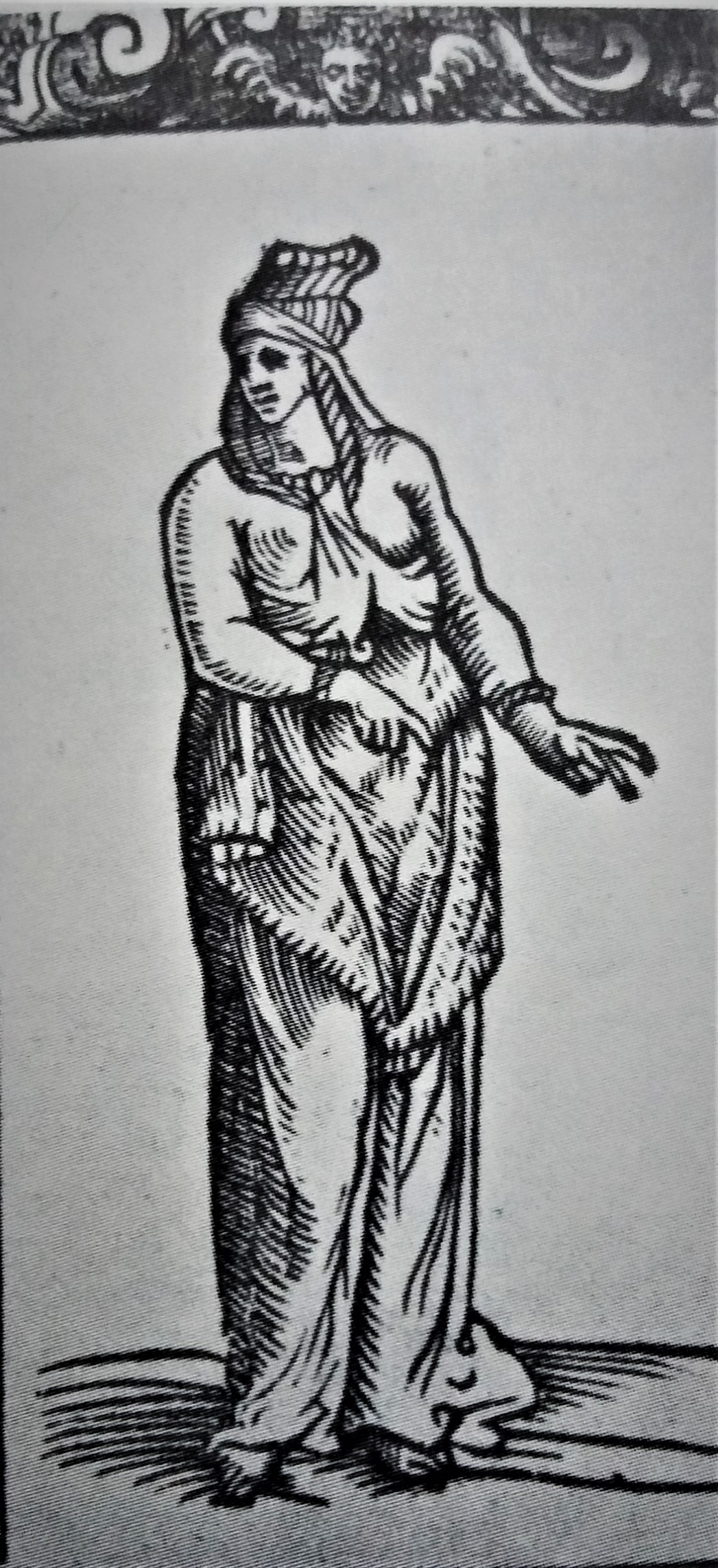
A Malukan lady, as depicted in C. Veccellio, Habiti antichi et moderni (1598).

In spite of the perennial rivalry with Ternate, relations were not entirely severed, as the two Sultanates stood in a dualistic relation sealed by marriages. The Portuguese complained that the Tidore ruler forwarded classified information to his Ternate counterpart. Gapi Baguna had a role in promoting the succession of Saidi Berkat as Sultan of Ternate in 1583. He was betrothed to a Ternatan princess, sister of Sultan Saidi Berkat, who feared that Tidore would otherwise support his uncle Mandar Syah who had claims to the Ternatan throne. As it was, the lady was abducted by Mandar Syah before the marriage had taken place. This notorious act was in fact carried out due to intrigues hatched by Sultan Saidi, who now found a good opportunity to execute his uncle and rival in 1586. Ternatan tradition says that the princess, Boki Randangagalo, was denounced by the Tidore ruler who is here called Mamolo; he left her to drift in a boat at sea, though she was rescued and brought to the Bacan Sultanate. To this incident is attributed the origin of the long-standing rivalry between Ternate and Tidore (which in fact had started long before).

== Death and succession ==
In the 1590s Gapi Baguna was already an old man by the standards of the time. He was known to maintain a relatively frugal lifestyle, and when he fell ill after a feast there were consequently suspicions of foul play. According to Argensola the ailing ruler died on 29 April 1599, shortly before the Dutch and English showed up in Maluku. Other documents suggest he may have died at least one month later. Argensola states that he left two nephews called Kaicili Mole and Kaicili Kota (the Younger). Mole was the heir to the throne by 1584. However, Kota was regarded the more legitimate heir, since his mother was the main consort of the previous ruler Gava. Since Kota was suspected of being inclined towards Ternate, it was eventually Mole who succeeded his uncle.

== See also ==
- List of rulers of Maluku
- Spice trade
- Sultanate of Tidore
- Sultanate of Ternate
- Portuguese-Ternate wars

Gapi Baguna
Preceded by Gava	Sultan of Tidore; 1560–1599	Succeeded by Mole Majimu
