= Ternate expedition (1585) =

1585 military expedition

- Part of Ternatean–Portuguese conflicts
Date	February – October 1585
Location	Ternate, Moluccas
Result	Ternatean–Kalinyamat victory

Belligerents
Spanish Empire; Portuguese Empire; Sultanate of Tidore; Sultanate of Bacan; Sultanate of Sulawesi	Sultanate of Ternate; Kalinyamat Sultanate

Commanders and leaders
Juan Morones; Diego de Azambuja; Duarte Pereira	Saidi Berkat

Strength
24 ships 300 Spanish; 600 Filipinos; Unknown Portuguese and Malay allies	30 Javanese junks

The Ternate expedition (February - October 1585) was launched by a joint of Spanish-Portuguese forces allied with the Sultanate of Tidore to capture the city of Ternate. The expedition failed and the allies withdrew after months of siege.

== Background ==
In 1584, a Portuguese galleon under Duarte Pereira at Tidore succeeded the governor, Diego de Azambuja; however, Diego refused to abdicate. A quarrel happened between those two, but the Spanish king brought about an accommodation between the two, and soon things were settled. Meanwhile, the Spanish governor of the Philippines, Santiago de Vera, dispatched a force of 300 Spaniards, 600 Filipinos, and 24 ships. The force left Manilla in February 1585 and arrived in Tidore which was led by Captain Juan Morones. Duarte encouraged Diego to participate in the expedition and promised to accompany him he went, and Diego agreed. The kings of Tidore, Bacan, and Sulawesi, joined the Iberians in their expedition.

== Expedition ==
The fortress of Ternate was conquered by Babullah restored the fortifications and supplied it with cannons he captured from the Portuguese. His successor, Saidi Berkat, was warned of the upcoming invasion and called for help from surrounding islands. The Javanese came to help with a navy of 30 junks and were known to be brave warriors. Before the commencement of the campaign, a Spanish messenger was sent to the Sultan to hand over the fortress. Saidi told him that he was willing to serve the king of Portugal as his vassal, but Morones wasn't satisfied, believing he could force him to surrender. The Rajas advised Juan to land at various points on the islands, but Juan preferred a regular siege. Juan landed unopposed and began erecting batteries and guns against the walls of Ternate. The bombardment proved ineffective and after 14 days, little progress was achieved, the allies made an assault against the walls; however, the Ternates and the Javanese bravely fought them off and repelled them, despite having many losses. Many Spanish began to feel ill. Juan failed to take measures to cut off the supplies from Ternate. He lifted the siege in October 1585 and left for Manilla where he arrived in November.

== Sources ==
- Gregorio F Zaide (1957), Philippine political and cultural history.
- Frederick Charles Danvers (1894), The Portuguese In India Vol II.
- Pieter Anton Tiele (1877), De Europeërs in den maleischen archipel.
