= Portuguese Empire in the Indonesian Archipelago =

Colony in Southeast Asia

Insulindia (Note: The term Indonesia did not yet exist.)
- c. 1522–1605
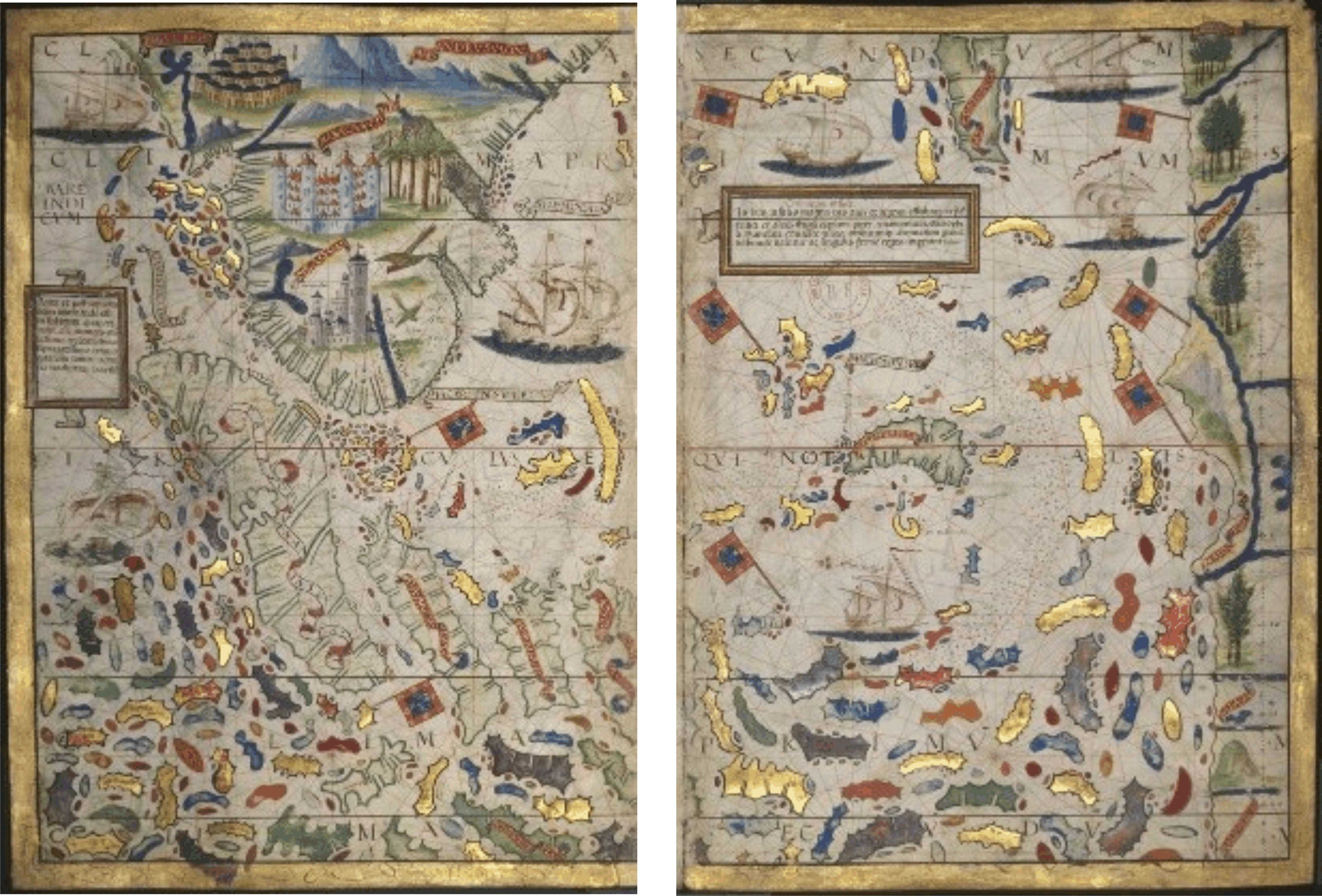
- Map of the Portuguese empire in the East Indies (including the Indonesian Archipelago), Atlas Miller.
- Status: Settlement and possessions of the Portuguese Empire
- Capital: São João Baptista de Ternate in Ternate (1523–1575); Nossa Senhora de Anunciada in Amboina, Moluccas (1575–1605)
- Common languages: Portuguese, Malay, Ternate, Tidore, other Indigenous languages.
- Government: Monarchy
- Monarch
  - 1522–1557: John III
  - 1598–1605: Philip III
- Captain-General
  - 1522–1525 (first): Antonio de Brito
  - 1602–1605 (last): Pedro Alvares de Abreu
- Historical era: Early modern
  - Established: c. 1522
  - Treaty of Zaragoza: 22 April 1529
  - Defeat and fall: 22 February 1605
Succeeded by
Dutch East India Company

Portuguese colonization era
- 1512–1605
Era of Islam	Dutch East India Company; Portuguese Timor
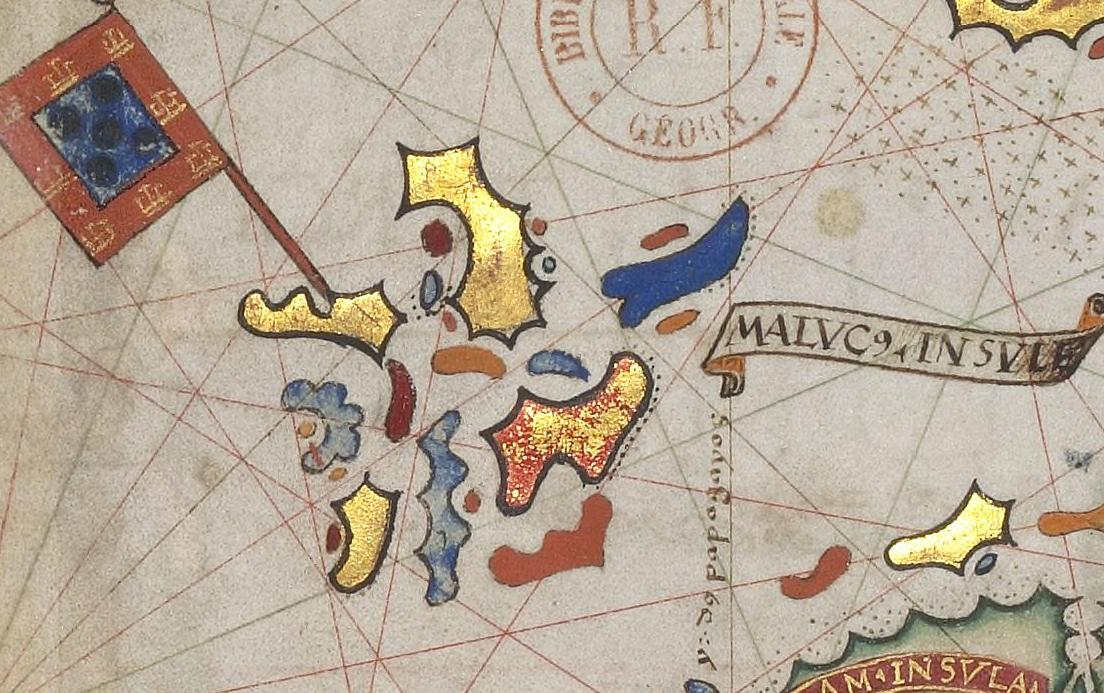
- Map from 1519 showing the islands of North Maluku, with the Portuguese banner planted.
- Location: Malay Archipelago, East Indies
- Including: Portuguese–Ternate wars
- Leader(s): Alfonso de Albuquerque; António de Abreu; Francisco Serrão
- Key events: Age of Discovery

The Portuguese were the first Europeans to establish a colonial presence in the Indonesian archipelago. Their quest to dominate the source of the spices that sustained the lucrative spice trade in the early 16th century, along with missionary efforts by Catholic orders, saw the establishment of trading posts and forts, and left behind a Portuguese cultural element that remains in modern-day Indonesia.

== Establishment ==
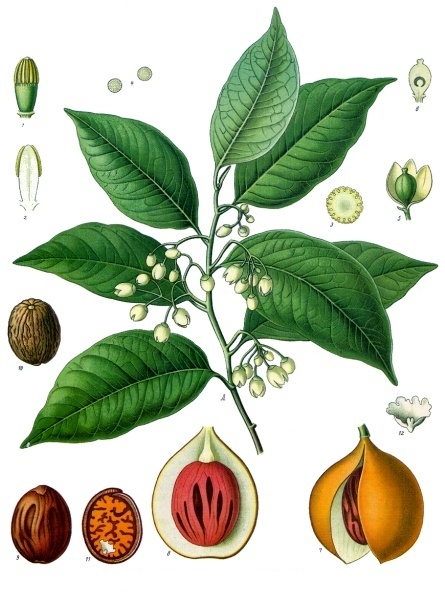
The nutmeg plant is native to the Banda Islands. Once one of the world's most valuable commodities, it drew the first European colonial powers to the Spice Islands.

Europeans were making technological advances in the early 16th century; new-found Portuguese expertise in navigation, shipbuilding and weaponry allowed them to make daring expeditions of exploration and expansion. Starting with the first exploratory expeditions sent from newly conquered Malacca in 1512, the Portuguese were the first Europeans to arrive in the East Indies, and sought to dominate the sources of valuable spices and to extend their Christian missionary efforts. Initial Portuguese attempts to establish a coalition and peace treaty in 1522 with the West Javan Sunda Kingdom failed, owing to hostilities among islamic kingdoms on Java. The Portuguese turned east to Moluccas, which comprised a varied collection of principalities and kingdoms that were occasionally at war with each other but maintained significant inter-island and international trade. Through both military conquest and alliance with local rulers, they established trading posts, forts, and missions in the North Sulawesi and in the Spice Islands, including Ternate, Ambon, and Solor.

The height of Portuguese missionary activities, however, came in the latter half of the 16th century, after the pace of their military conquest in the archipelago had stopped and their East Asian interest was shifting to Portuguese India, Portuguese Ceylon, Japan, Macau and China; and sugar in Brazil and the Atlantic slave trade in turn further distracted their efforts in the East Indies. In addition, the first European people to arrive in Northern Sulawesi were the Portuguese. Francisco Xavier supported and visited the Portuguese mission at Tolo on Halmahera. This was the first Catholic mission in the Moluccas. The mission began in 1534 when some chiefs from Morotai came to Ternate asking to be baptised. Simão Vaz, the vicar of Ternate, went to Tolo to found the mission. The mission was the source of conflict between the Spanish, the Portuguese and Ternate. Simão Vaz was later murdered at Sao.

== Decline and legacy ==
The Portuguese presence in the East Indies was reduced to Flores, Solor, and Timor (see Portuguese Timor), alongside a small community in Kampung Tugu following defeat in 1575 at Ternate at the hands of indigenous Ternateans, Dutch conquests in Ambon, north Maluku and Banda, and a general failure for sustained control of trade in the region. In comparison with the original Portuguese ambition to dominate Asian trade, their influences on modern Indonesian culture are minor: the romantic keroncong guitar ballads, a number of Indonesian words and some family names in eastern Indonesia such as da Costa, Dias, de Fretes, and Gonsalves. The most significant impacts of the Portuguese arrival were the disruption and the disorganisation of the trade network, mostly as a result of their conquest of Portuguese Malacca and the first significant plantings of Christianity in Indonesia, with the Kristang people. Christian communities in eastern Indonesia have continued to exist and have contributed to a sense of shared interest with Europeans, particularly among the Ambonese.

== See also ==
- Indonesia–Portugal relations
- Mardijker people
- Portuguese East India Company
- Portuguese Indonesians
- Portuguese loanwords in Indonesian
- Portuguese Timor
- Timeline of Indonesian history
