= Indonesia–Portugal relations =

- Indonesia: Portugal

Diplomatic mission
- Embassy of Indonesia, Lisbon: Embassy of Portugal, Jakarta

Indonesia and Portugal established diplomatic relations in 1950. Portuguese explorer and trader first reached Indonesian archipelago during the Age of Exploration in the 16th century in order to search for spices in the Indies.

In 1999, Indonesia and Portugal restored diplomatic relations, which were severed following the Indonesian invasion of East Timor in 1975. Indonesia has an embassy in Lisbon and Portugal has an embassy in Jakarta.

== History ==
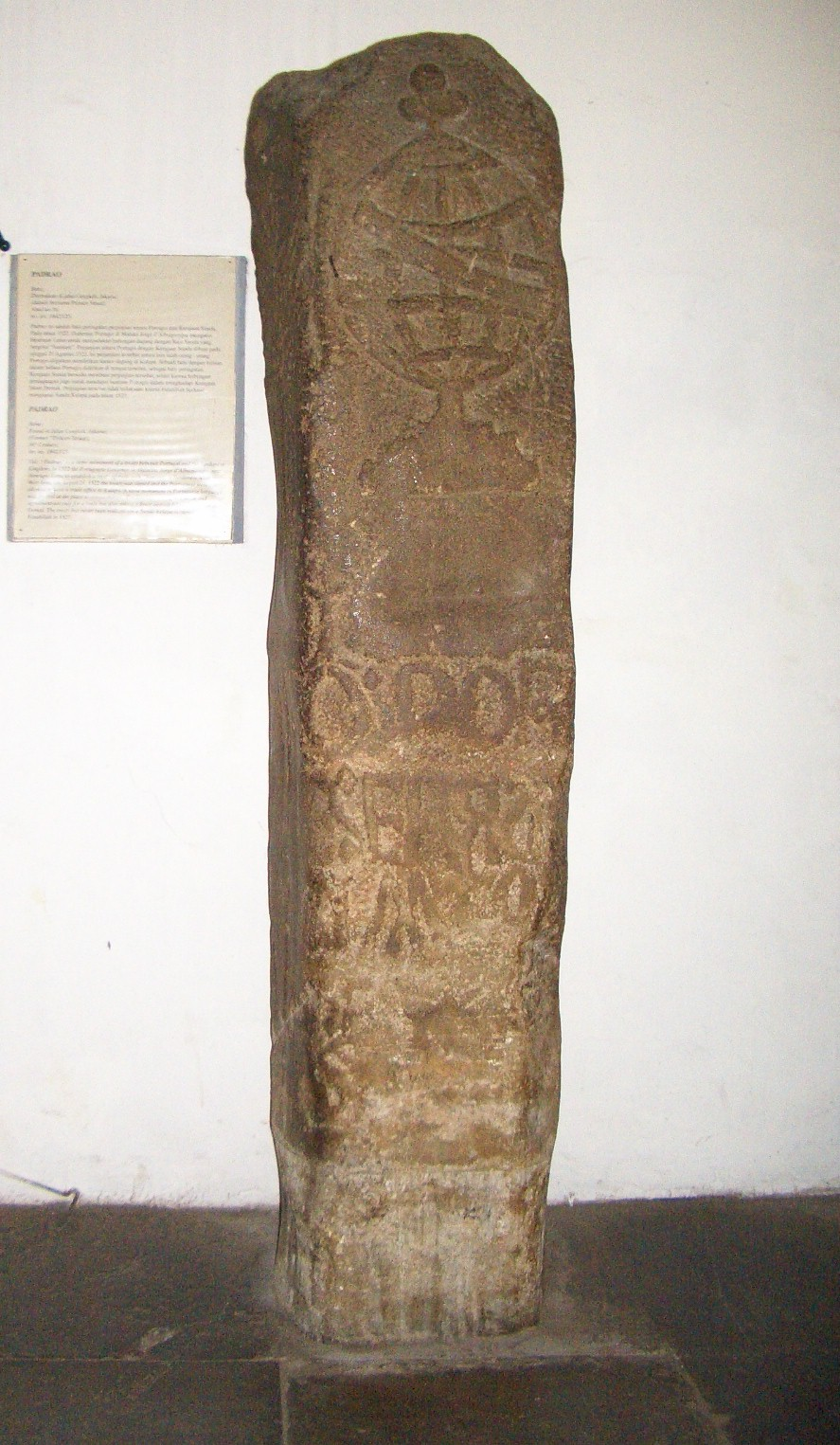
Padrão of Sunda Kelapa (1522), National Museum of Indonesia, Jakarta.

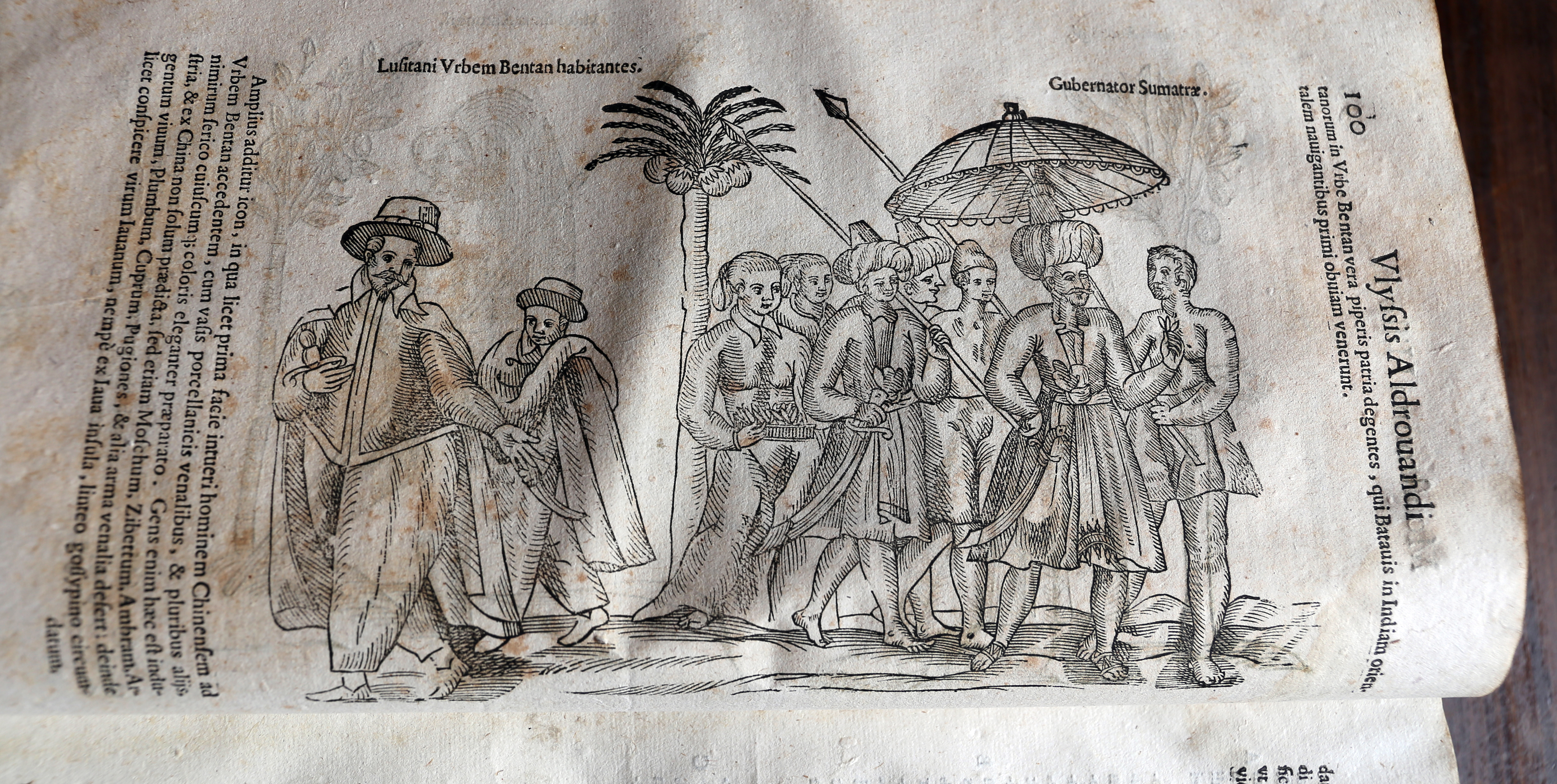
Portuguese residents of Banten and the governor of Sumatra, 16th century

Since gaining foothold in Southeast Asian region by acquiring port of Malacca in 1511, Portuguese sent exploratory expeditions into Indonesian archipelago, and sought to dominate the sources of valuable spices and to extend their Roman Catholic missionary efforts. Tomé Pires' Suma Oriental, written between 1512 and 1515, provides important information about 16th century Indonesia through Portuguese perspective.

Initial Portuguese attempts to establish a coalition and peace treaty in 1522 with the West Javan Sunda Kingdom, failed due hostilities amongst indigenous kingdoms on Java. The Portuguese turned east to Maluku. Through both military conquest and alliance with local rulers, they established trading posts, forts, and missions in eastern Indonesia including the islands of Ternate, Ambon, and Solor.

Following defeat in 1575 at Ternate at the hands of natives, Portuguese lost much of its trading posts and its former East Indies possessions to Dutch, and its presence in Indonesia was reduced to Solor, Flores and Timor (see Portuguese Timor) in modern-day Nusa Tenggara.

After the independence of Indonesia, the two countries officially opened diplomatic relations in 1950. Indonesia's first president Sukarno visited Portugal in 1960. The diplomatic relations were severed since 1964, and were restored in May 1975 for decolonization of Portuguese Timor neighboring Indonesian side of Timor Island. However, on 7 December 1975 Portugal severed diplomatic ties following the Indonesian invasion of East Timor. Then 24 years later on 28 December 1999, Indonesia and Portugal restored their diplomatic ties, four months after East Timorese voted for independence from Indonesia. In May 2012 President Aníbal Cavaco Silva visited Indonesia, this was the first visit by a Portuguese president since the two countries opened diplomatic relations in 1950.

== Culture ==
Portuguese was among the first European that made initial contact to the natives of Indonesian archipelago. The cultural impact can be seen through the adoptions of Portuguese loanwords in Indonesian, that mostly about things brought by Europeans, such as sabun (from sabão = soap), boneka (from boneca = doll), gereja (from igreja = church), bola (from bola = ball), bendera (from bandeira = flag), sepatu (from sapato = shoes), keju (from queijo = cheese), and mentega (from manteiga = butter). Portuguese influences can be found in various parts in Indonesia from Aceh in the West through Flores and Maluku in the East. In Jakarta, in the Tugu area, Portuguese descents are now living preserving the keroncong music which carries much influence from the Portuguese music. In Larantuka, Flores, every year ahead of the Easter Day the city is full with pilgrims who wish to celebrate 'Semana Santa' or the Holy Week. Christians there conduct mass and rituals in Portuguese.

== Trade ==
From 2010 to 2011, there was an increase of 58 percent of trade volume to make the total value of the two countries` trade to reach US$171 million.

== See also ==
- Foreign relations of Indonesia
- Foreign relations of Portugal
- Portuguese colonialism in Indonesia
- Luso Sundanese padrão
- Roman Catholicism in Indonesia
