= Saidi Berkat =

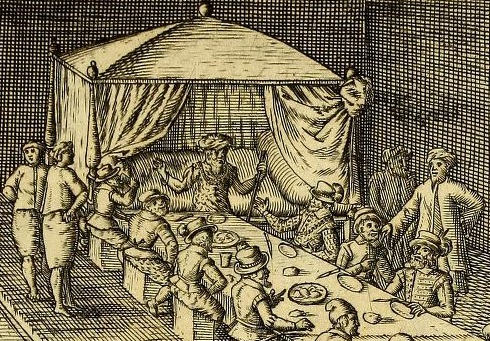
- Saidi Berkat receiving the Dutch, from a 1607 book.

Sultan of Ternate
- Reign: 1583–1606
- Predecessor: Babullah
- Successor: Mudafar Syah I
- Born: c. 1563
- Died: 1628; Manila, Philippines
- Father: Babullah
- Mother: Bega
- Religion: Sunni Islam

Sultan Saidi Berkat (Jawi: سلطان سعيد الدين برکت; c. 1563 – 1628) was the eighth Sultan of Ternate in the Maluku Islands. His capital and seat of power was in the city of Ternate. He succeeded to the extensive east Indonesian realm built up by his father Sultan Babullah, reigning from 1583 to 1606. The Spanish, who colonized the Philippines and had interests in Maluku, repeatedly tried to subdue Ternate, but were unsuccessful in their early attempts. Saidi's reign coincides with the arrival of the Dutch in Maluku, which indirectly caused his deposal and exile through a Spanish invasion.

== Taking over the spice empire ==
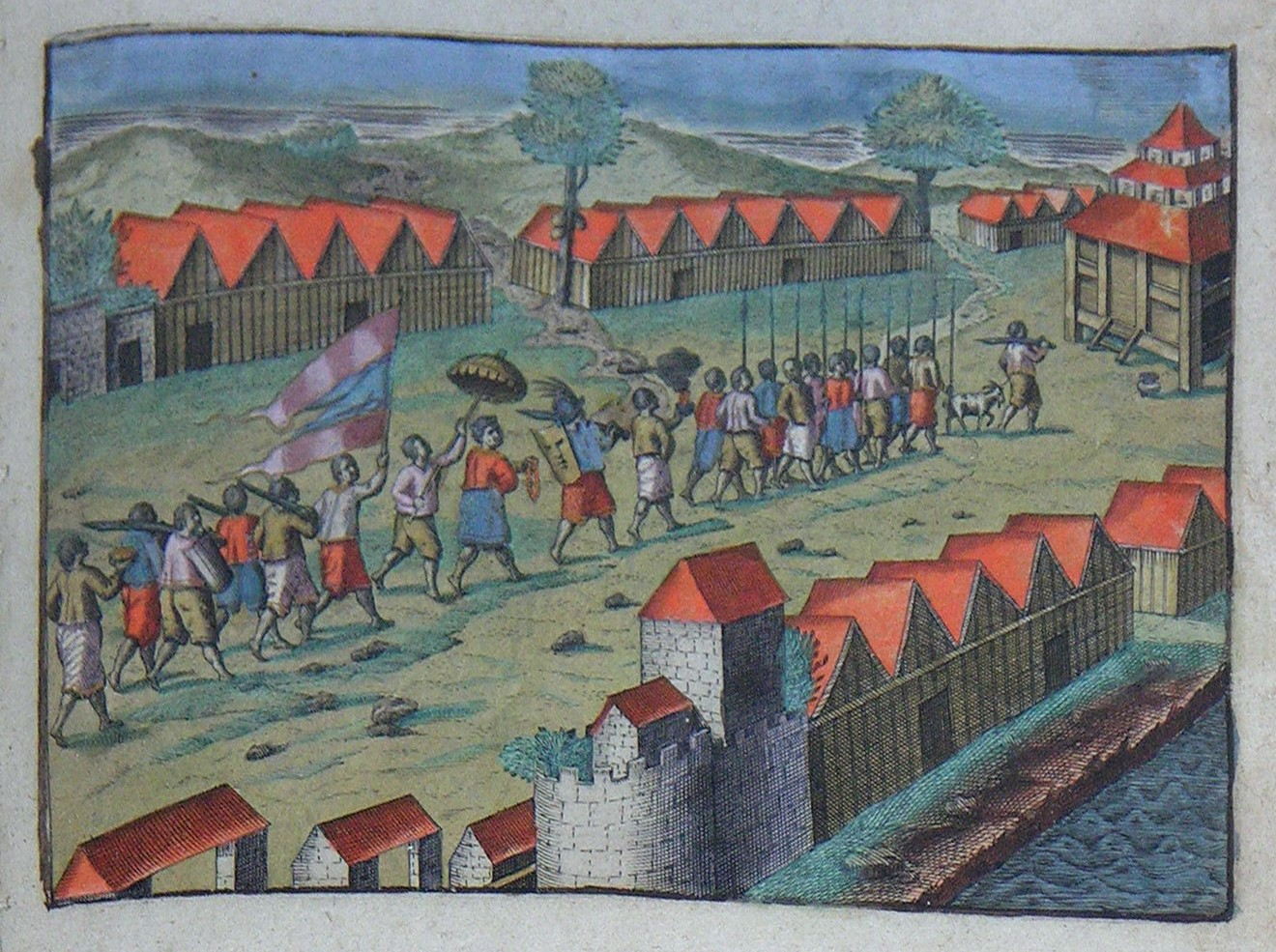
Saidi Berkat and his entourage on the way to the mosque, according to Johann Theodor de Bry (1601).

Saidi Berkat, also called Said Din Berkat Syah, was, according to Dutch information, born in c. 1563 in the time of his grandfather Sultan Hairun. His mother Bega was a co-wife of Prince Baab, later Sultan Babullah. After the assassination of Hairun at the hands of the Portuguese in 1570, Babullah took over and successfully fought the European intruders. Portuguese power became restricted to a few forts in Tidore and Ambon and they lost control over the trade in spices which gave Maluku its wider significance. Babullah built up a veritable maritime empire that encompassed most of Maluku, parts of Sulawesi, and even remoter territories. This meant that the lively trade in cloves, nutmeg and forest products proceeded under relatively free and unrestricted conditions, attracting merchants from several regions - Portuguese, Javanese, Malays.

As Babullah died in July 1583, Saidi succeeded him, though not without controversy. Babullah had a half-brother Mandar Syah, whose higher birth on his mother's side gave rights to claim the throne. However, Babullah had persuaded his oldest brother Kaicili (prince) Tolu to support Saidi's succession by letting Saidi marry Tolu's daughter Ainal-ma-lamo. A few years later Saidi hatched an intrigue to get rid of Mandar Syah. One of his sisters had since long been promised as consort to Gapi Baguna, the Sultan of Tidore who, although supported by the Spanish and Portuguese, still entertained relations with his neighbour and had a role in Saidi's enthronement. Mandar Syah showed interest in the princess, his niece, and Saidi unscrupulously encouraged him to abduct her. Mandar Syah actually eloped with her, to the furor of Gapi Baguna. Saidi now handily executed his uncle under the pretext of calming down the feelings of the Tidore ruler. This treacherous behaviour evoke the anger of other Ternatan princes. Enraged over the loss of his brother, Tolu began to plot to overthrow Saidi in 1587, and contacted the Spanish and Portuguese on the matter. The idea was to join forces to eliminate Saidi, but the Europeans lacked sufficient resources at the moment to allow themselves be involved, and Tolu died shortly after.

== Abortive Spanish advances ==
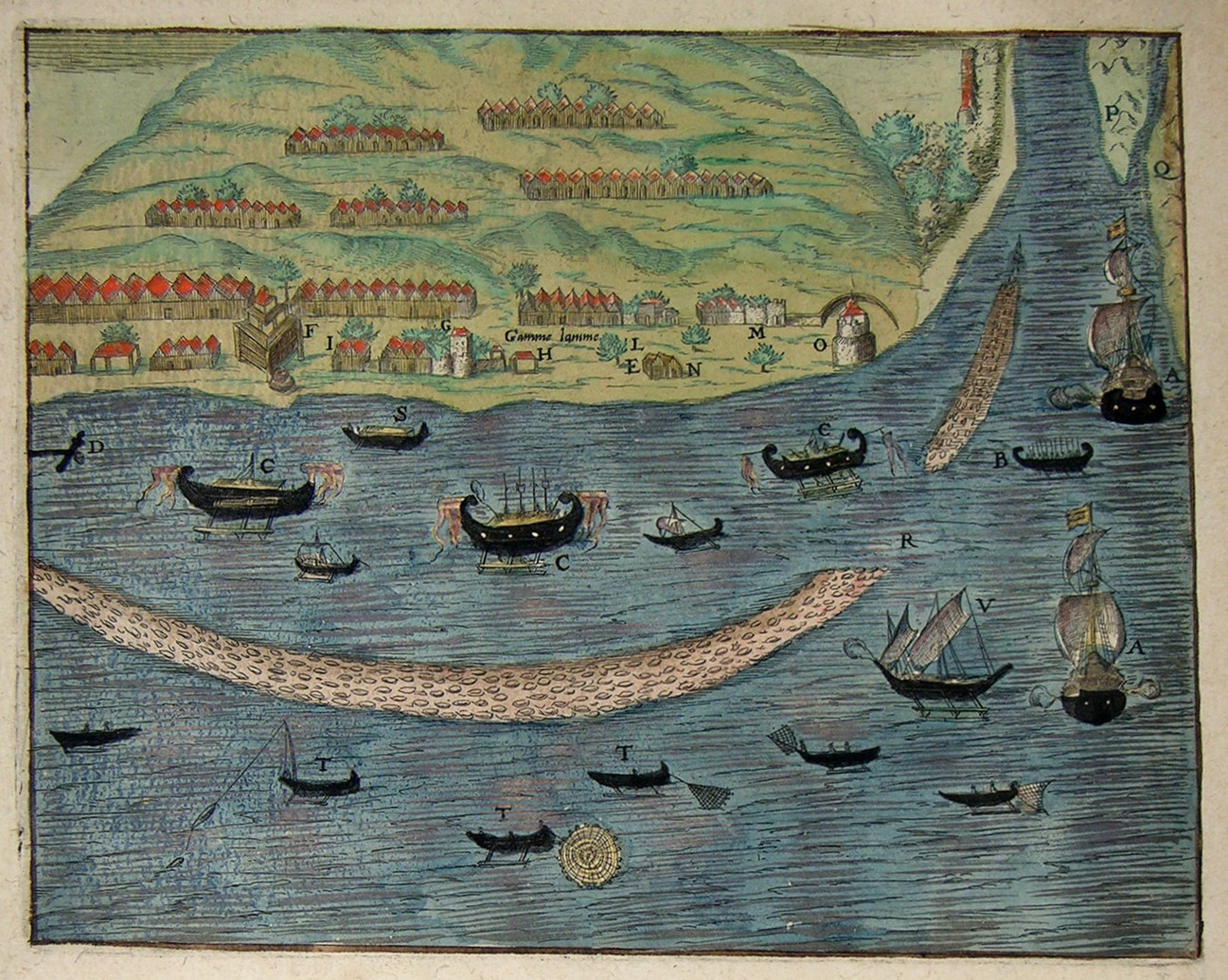
The royal seat Gammalamo in Ternate as it looked in 1599, at the first Dutch visit.

The Spanish governor in the Philippines, Santiago de Vera, tried to strengthen the Iberian positions in Maluku after Babullah's demise. A small fleet of four frigates under Pedro Sarmiento was dispatched from Manila in 1584 and forced the Ternatan dependency Moti Island to submit temporarily with the help of the Tidorese allies. Three frigates were then dispatched to the Bacan Islands to take in foodstuff. However, Kaicili Tolu met them in a sea battle where one frigate exploded as a vat of gunpowder was lit, and the others withdrew to Tidore. In the next year 1585 a larger Spanish fleet appeared in Maluku, driven by fear that the English might try to establish a post in the Spice Islands. Saidi was requested to give up the formerly Portuguese fort on Ternate, but gave a vague answer. Supported by the rulers of Tidore, Bacan and northern Sulawesi, the Iberian forces invaded Ternate. The defenders, reinforced by the crews of 30 Javanese merchant vessels, successfully defeated an attempt to storm the fortress. The Spanish commander Juan de Morones was forced to give up the enterprise and shortly returned to Manila. A new expedition with 2,000 Spanish and Filipino soldiers was dispatched in 1593 but faltered due to a mutiny among the Chinese rowers. A few years later Saidi went on the offensive, sending a strong fleet of korakoras (large outriggers) to Mindanao which was loosely claimed by Ternate. They joined local rebels and Malay raiders to fight the Spaniards, but were eventually expelled in 1596.

== Arrival of the Dutch ==
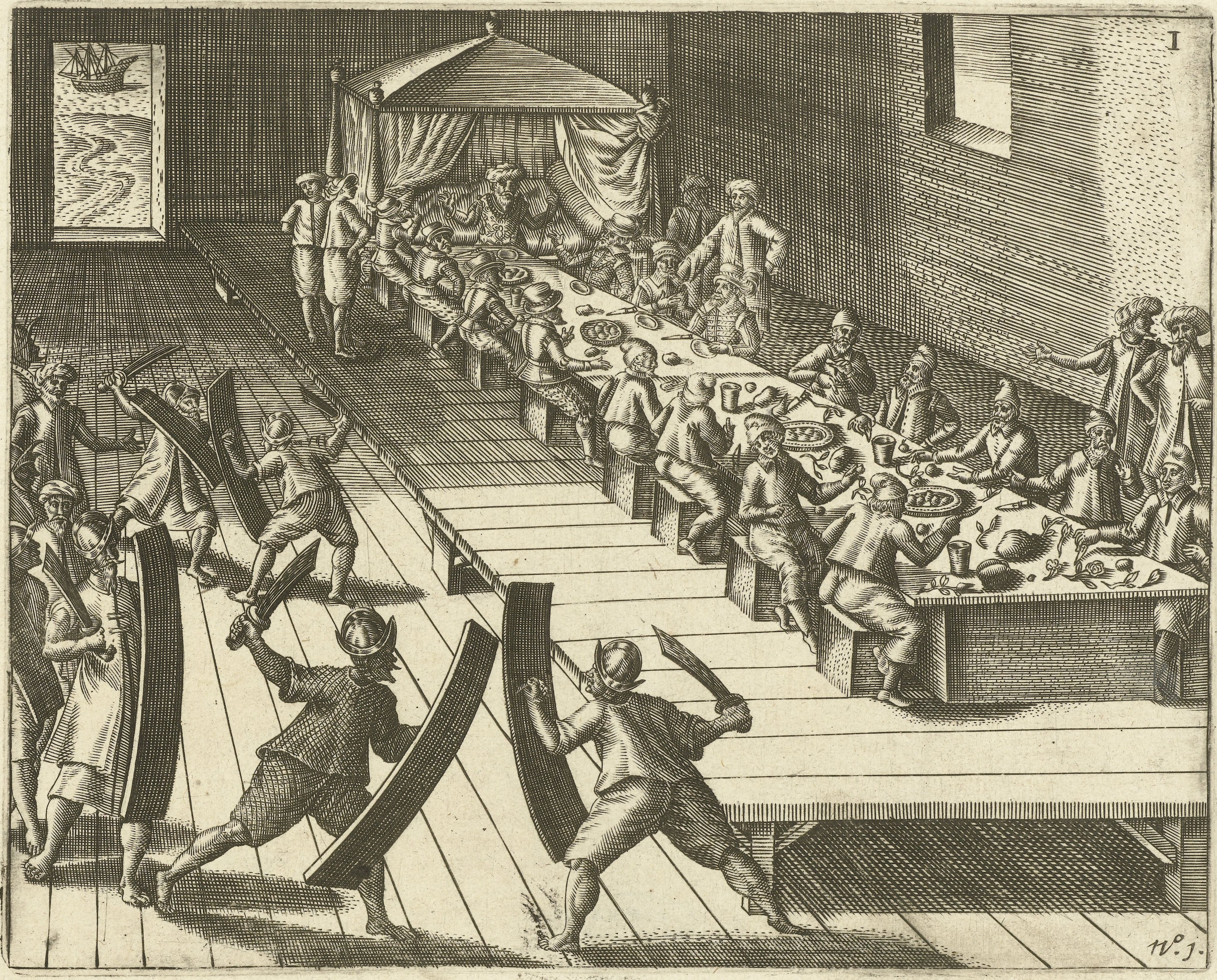
Saidi Berkat entertains Jacob van Neck and his men, illustration from about 1654.

The Dutch first arrived to Indonesia in 1596 and were, like the Portuguese, bent on controlling the spice trade. Their first visit to Ternate followed in 1599 with two ships under Captain Wijbrand van Warwijk. Sultan Saidi received them in a friendly mood, hoping to use the newcomers against his indigenous and European enemies. The Dutch described him as strong, big man of about 36 years, pleasant, humorous and very curious about new things. He was a renowned warrior and a devoted Muslim. Ternate was described as almost devoid of foodstuff apart from sago. Local society was only partly monetarized. The inhabitants had a "good and sweet" temper though they bore a mortal hatred for the Portuguese. When Van Warwijk departed he left some crew members on the island in order to stock cloves. A new visit under Jacob Cornelisz van Neck took place in 1601. Since Spain and Portugal were at war with the Dutch Republic in Europe, the presence of the newcomers alarmed the Iberian colonist. A Spanish-Portuguese force once again tried to conquer Ternate in 1603 but was heavily defeated by the Ternatans and Javanese mercenaries. This in turn prompted a Dutch counter-attack in 1605 under Cornelis Sebastiaansz, that captured the Iberian fort in Tidore after a furious fight. The defeated enemy was allowed to sail for the Philippines. With Saidi's consent, a Dutch token force was henceforth kept in Ternate.

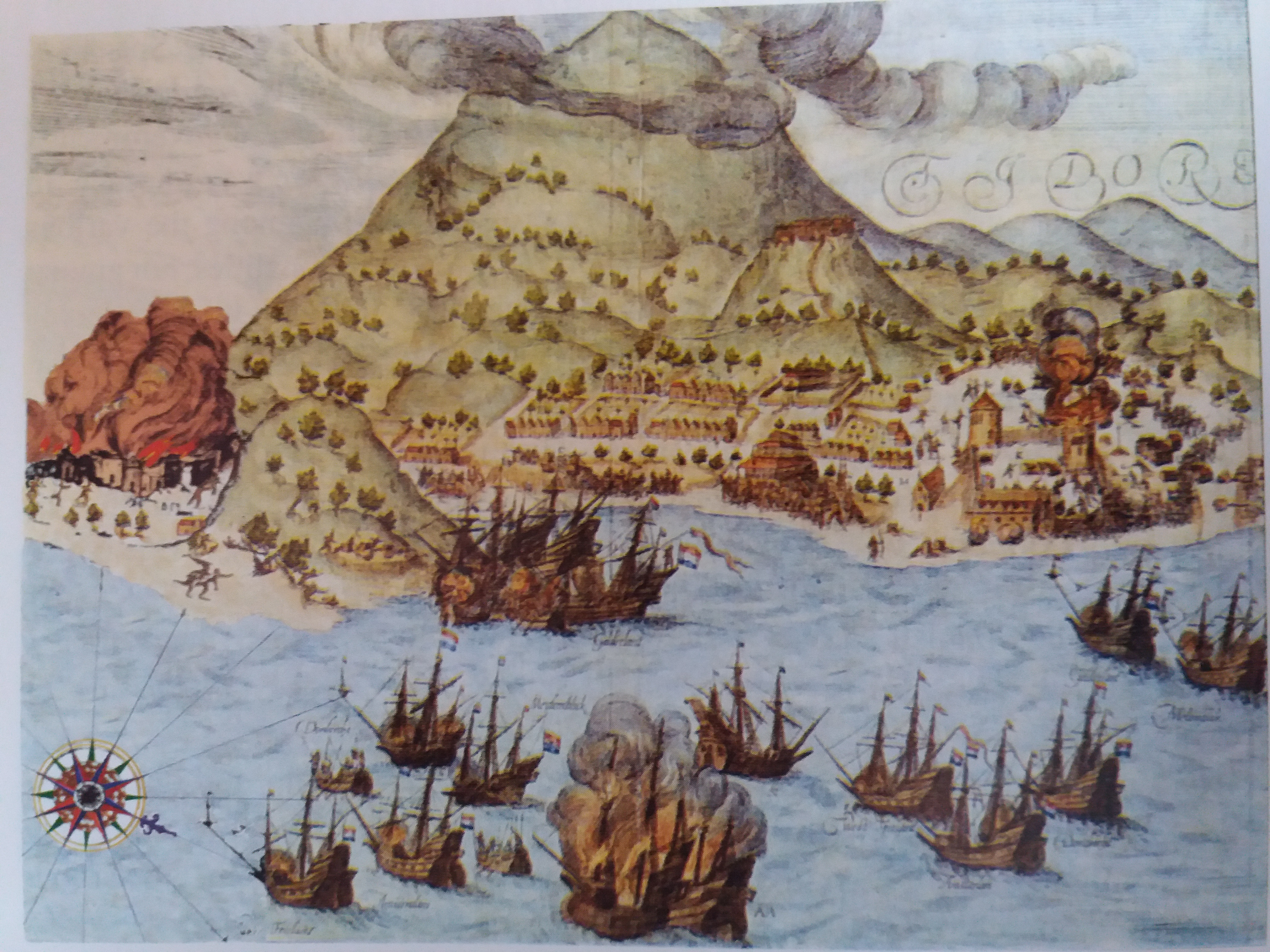
The VOC-Ternate forces take the Portuguese fort in Tidore in 1605, illustration from India Orientalis (1607).

== The Spanish conquest of Maluku ==
Iberian power in Maluku was now entirely depleted, since the Portuguese stronghold in Ambon had also been captured. These losses inspired Governor Pedro Bravo de Acuña to dare a larger enterprise. This time more than 3,000 men were sent on 37 larger and smaller vessels, departing from Iloilo in January 1606. Helped by 600 Tidorese auxiliaries, the Spaniards undertook a well-coordinated attack on Ternate on 1 April. The defenders were quickly overwhelmed and Sultan Saidi escaped to Halmahera with a number of followers. With Ternate in their hands again after 36 years, the Iberians demanded the surrender of Saidi as a condition for peace. Some Ternatans declared that their Sultan had behaved in a negligent and despotic fashion, and professed their loyalty to the Iberian Crown. Saidi complied and gave himself up, though this did not save his position. He was brought to Manila with the victorious fleet, together with most of the royal family.

With this, most of Maluku was securely under the thumb of Spain. A peace treaty was forced upon Ternate, where they promised to have no contact with the English or Dutch, allow Catholic missionizing, and abide to Spanish dispositions. However, a new Sultan was soon proclaimed by some Ternatan grandees. This was Saidi's son Mudafar Syah I who allied with the Dutch, who were soon to come back to northern Maluku.

== Exile and death ==
Saidi and his kin had to participate in a triumphal parade in Manila. His appearance on the occasion is described thus: "That King was strong body'd, and his Limbs well Knit; his Neck, and great Part of his Arms he wore naked; his Skin being the Colour of a Cloud rather inclined to Black than Tawny. The Features of his Face were like a European. His eyes large, full, and sparkling, to which they add the Fierceness of long Eyebrows, thick Beard and Whiskers, and lank Hair. He always wore his Campilane, or Cimiter, and Criz, or Dagger, the Hilts of them resembling the Heads of Snakes gilt."

As most of Maluku slipped from their power in the next years due to the intervention of the Dutch East India Company, the Spanish tried to make use of their exalted prisoner. In 1611 Governor Juan de Silva appeared in front of Ternate with a fleet, accompanied by Saidi, and tried to bring about a reconciliation with the Ternatan elite. This initiative failed, however. In 1623 a Spanish embassy turned up in Ternate with letters from Saidi where his good treatment was emphasized. During a meeting the Spaniards and Ternatans agreed to make peace, under the condition that Saidi should be sent back from exile. In the end the ex-Sultan was never actually returned to Ternate, so that hostilities resumed. Saidi eventually died in his Spanish-Philippine exile in 1628.

== Family ==
Sultan Saidi Berkat had the following wives:

- Ainal-ma-lamo, daughter of Kaicili Tolu
- Sirikaya, daughter of the Sangaji of Moti

He had the following known children:

- Kaicili Sidang, killed in action in 1613
- Kaicili Gapi, killed in action in 1613
- Mudafar Syah I, Sultan of Ternate 1606-1627
- A daughter, married the vassal ruler Doa of Jailolo
- A daughter, married Sultan Nur Salat of Bacan in 1616

== See also ==
- List of rulers of Maluku
- Sultanate of Ternate
- Sultanate of Tidore
- Portuguese-Ternate wars

Saidi Berkat
Preceded by Babullah	Sultan of Ternate; 1583–1606	Succeeded by Mudafar Syah I
