= Ternatean–Portuguese conflicts =

Colonial war in the Moluccas

- Part of Portuguese colonization in Indonesia
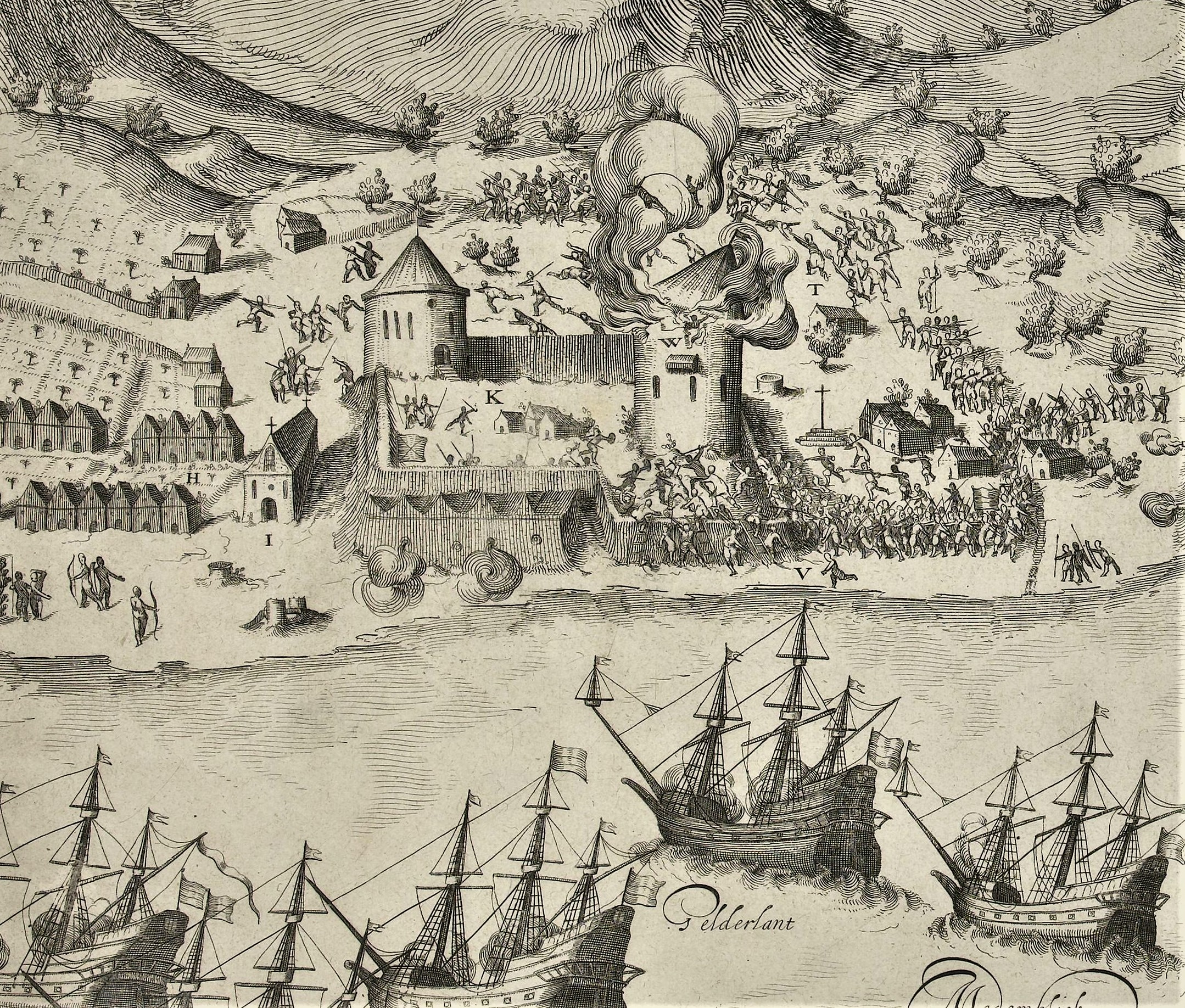
- The Dutch and Ternatans conquer the Portuguese fort in Tidore in 1605, from India Orientalis (1607)
Date	1530–1605 (intermittently)
Location	Moluccas

Belligerents
Ternate Sultanate; Kalinyamat Sultanate; Dutch East India Company	Portuguese Empire; Spanish Empire; Tidore Sultanate; Bacan Sultanate; Sulawesi Sultanate

Commanders and leaders
Sultan Hairun X; Babullah; Saidi Berkat; Steven der Hagen; Cornelis Bastiaensz	Diogo de Mesquita †; Nuno de Lacerda; Gaspar de Mello; Pedro de Acuña; Gapi Baguna

The Ternatean–Portuguese conflicts were a series of conflicts in the Spice Islands in eastern Indonesia between the Portuguese and their allies on one hand, and the Sultanate of Ternate and its allies, on the other. Hostilities broke out from time to time after the establishment of Portugal in Moluccas in 1522. The strongly Catholic and Muslim identities of the combatants gave the struggle elements of a war of religion, although this aspect was frequently blurred by cross-faith alliances. It was also an economic war since the Portuguese aim was to control export of the profitable trade in cloves. Portuguese-Ternatean rivalry later merged with attempts of expansion by the Spaniards in the Philippines. The Portuguese were eventually defeated in 1605 by an alliance between the Dutch East India Company (VOC) and Ternate, ending their active involvement in Moluccas affairs. However, they were soon replaced by the Spanish who maintained an Iberian presence in the region up to 1663.

== Context ==
The Sultanate of Ternate was the most powerful realm in the Moluccas by the early 16th century and handled much of the lucrative spice trade. However, its position was always insecure, due to the presence of three other sultanates, Tidore, Jailolo, and Bacan. When the Portuguese conquered the vital trading entrepot Malacca in 1511, this had consequences for the trade in cloves that had largely flowed via Malacca. The Moluccan sultanates were therefore interested in befriending the Portuguese who appeared in Moluccan waters from 1512. Sultan Bayan Sirrullah of Ternate invited the foreigners to his islands. A fort, São João Baptista, was constructed at the south coast of Ternate, near the sultan's seat, around 1522.

== Early clashes (1530–1557) ==
However, the manners of the Portuguese garrison and efforts to regulate the spice trade soon led to dissatisfaction. The political situation was further complicated by the neighbouring island Tidore that allied with the Spaniards, who showed up in the Moluccas from time to time.

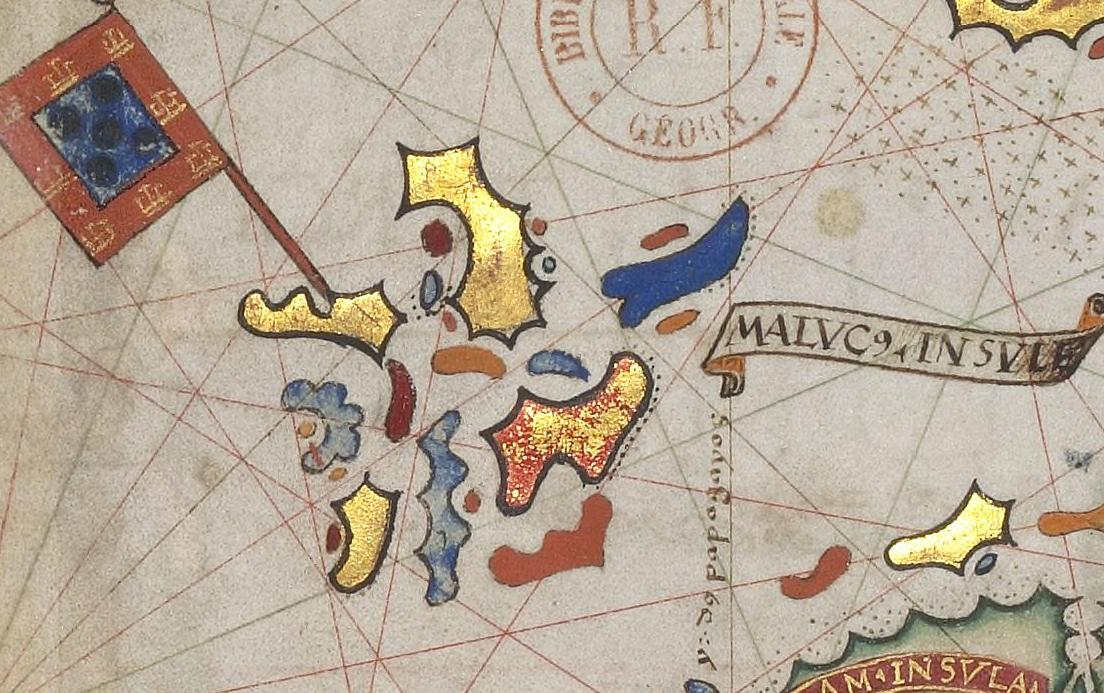
Map from 1519 showing the islands of North Moluccas, with the Portuguese banner planted.

A first crisis erupted in 1530 when the Portuguese captain arrested and executed the Ternatan regent Darwis on unproven accusations of treason. The mother of the young Sultan Dayal reacted by withdrawing to a fortified place on the island, and forbade the people to deliver foodstuff to São João Baptista. The crisis ended when a new captain, Gonçalo Pereira arrived to Ternate, and a temporary reconciliation took place.

A series of new sieges of the fort followed. The Ternateans temporarily allied with Tidore, Bacan, and the Papuan Islands to maintain the blockade. With no hope for relief, the Portuguese agreed to release Sultan Dayal, who had effectively been kept prisoner and thus peace was restored.

New disturbances soon surfaced. The new captain Vicente de Fonseca began to plot with the Ternatean grandee Pati Sarangi to get rid of the young monarch. The plans were discovered, however, and Dayal and his mother escaped to Tidore in 1533, where his maternal uncle Sultan Mir ruled. He later proceeded to Jailolo at safe distance from the Portuguese.

=== 1535-1537 revolt ===
The fugitive Dayal was active in fomenting a new alliance with the rulers Mir of Tidore, Alauddin I of Bacan and Katarabumi of Jailolo, in order to regain his throne. The new Ternatean regent Samarau also sympathized with the alliance. By now, the Portuguese were badly cornered in their fortress. At this moment, in October 1536, a relief armada appeared from Malacca with a new captain, António Galvão. The capable Galvão, accompanied by 170 Portuguese and 120 dependents led an attack on the fortification of the four allies in Tidore. The allies were well equipped with 5-600 firearms, cuirasses, coats of mail, helmets and swords which had been taken from the Portuguese or received from the Spaniards. In spite of this the invasion was completely successful, and the defenders were pushed back on 21 December. Dayal was severely wounded in the fighting and died soon after. The allied kings had to agree on peace with the Portuguese.

== Heightened tension under Hairun (1557–1570) ==
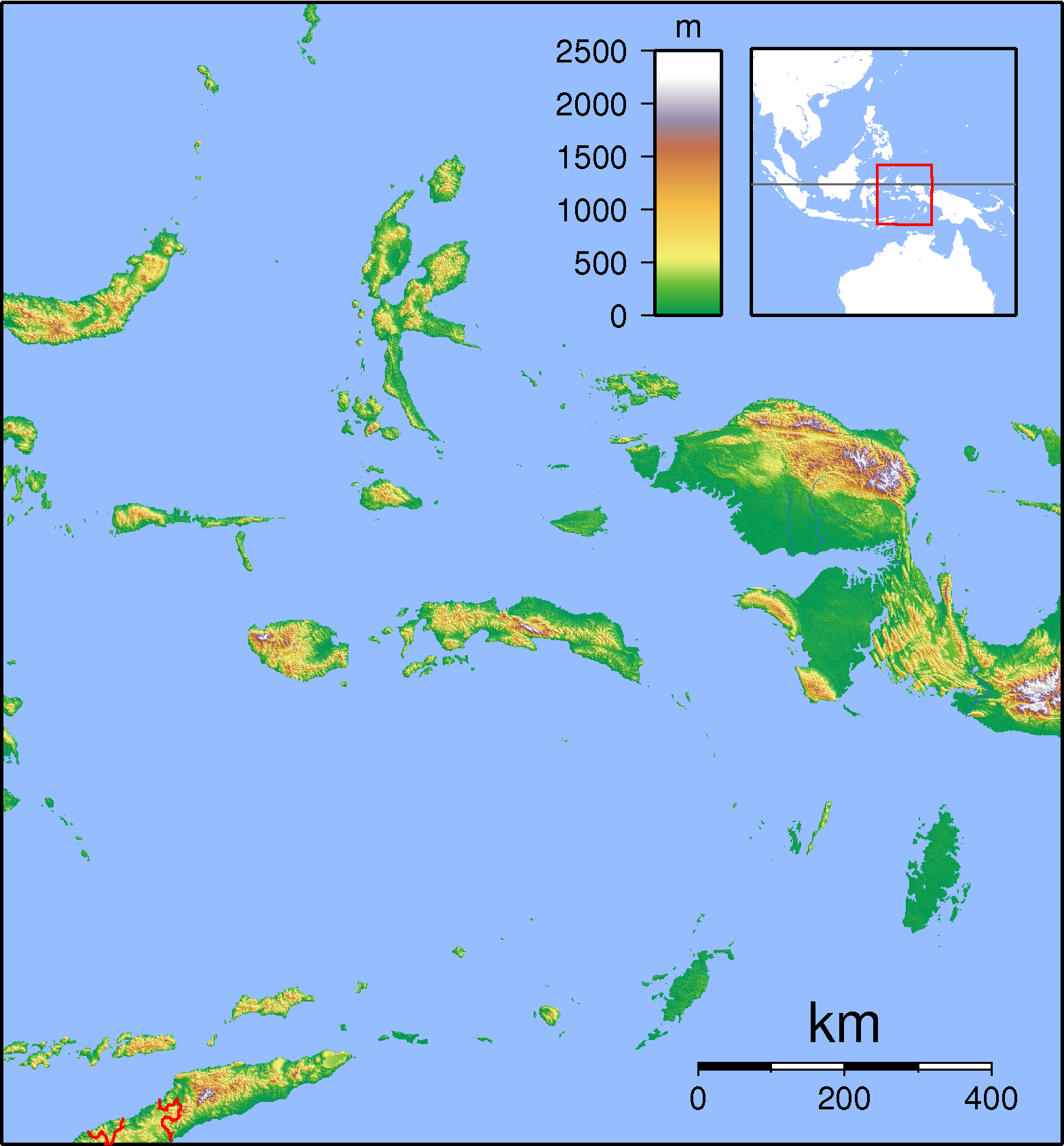
The geographical outlines of the Moluccas.

At this time, a brother of Dayal called Hairun was Sultan and, as such, dependent on the Portuguese. During his long reign (1535–1570) he oscillated between enmity and friendship with the Portuguese. A rift appeared in 1557 since the latter confiscated the clove harvest from Makian and imprisoned the Sultan for security reasons. The enraged Ternatean chiefs now allied with the Sultan of Tidore and attacked the positions of the Portuguese. Eventually the Portuguese found reason to depose the captain of their garrison and release Hairun. The parties then arrived to an agreement. Hairun and his son Baab signed a letter of vassalage which is the oldest preserved letter with seals in Indonesia.

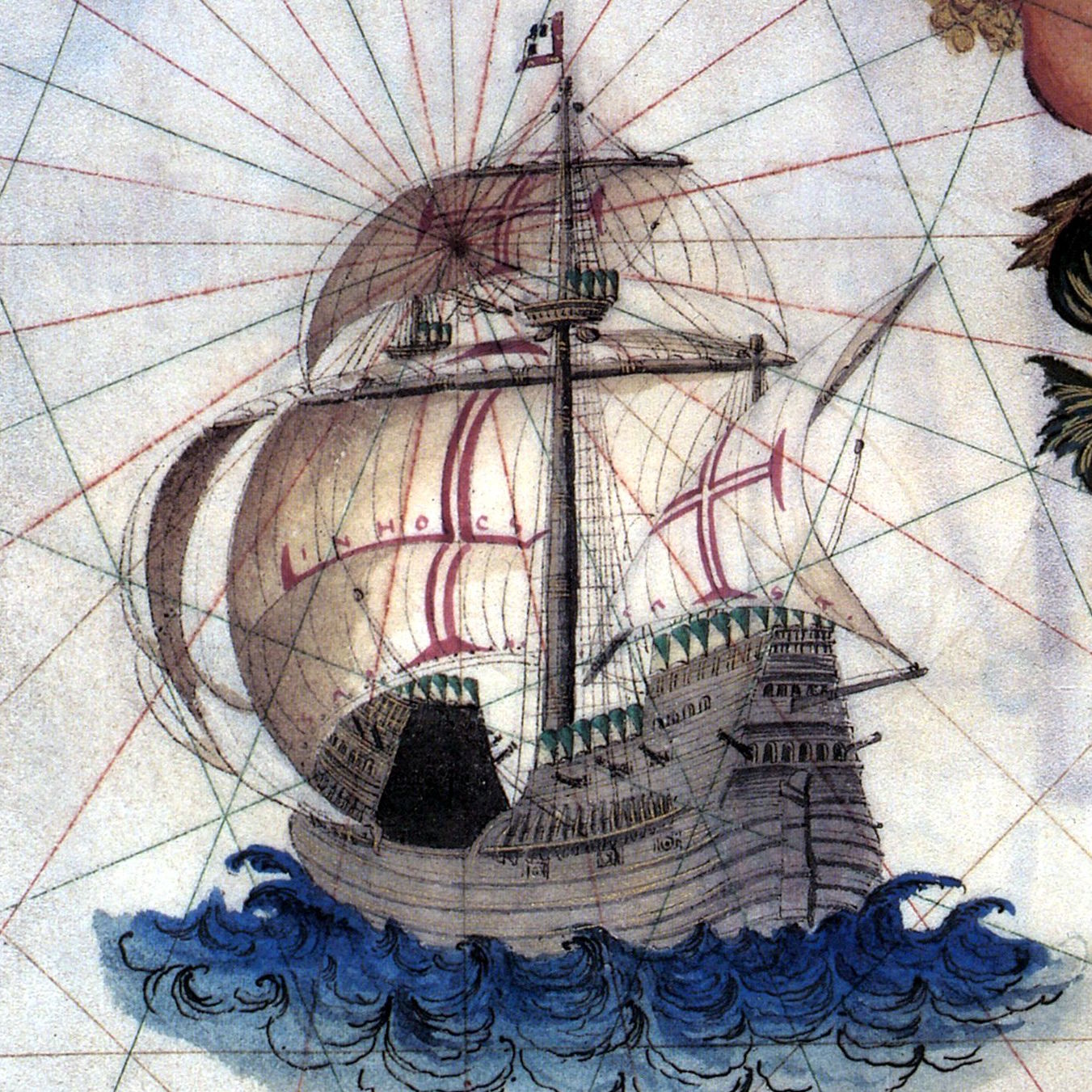
A Portuguese carrack from a map dated 1565.

Nevertheless, Hairun encouraged attacks against Christian settlements that took a high toll in human lives. In the 1560s he sent war fleets, with participation from his son Baab, to help up the Muslim positions in Ambon where Catholic missionaries had been successful. The Muslims of Hitu in northern Ambon were supported both by Hairun and Javanese troops from Jepara and were successful for a while. The Portuguese left Ambon to its fate for several years, though they eventually came back to build a new stronghold in 1569. Since the Sultan was active in the waterways, he could harass the vital deliveries of foodstuff from Moro in Halmahera to the Portuguese settlement and garrison in Ternate.

== Siege of Ternate (1570–1575) ==
The Portuguese captain Diogo Lopes de Mesquita eventually ordered the assassination of Hairun in February 1570. This act immediately triggered a violent uprising under his son Baab or Babullah who was proclaimed Sultan on Hiri Island, north of Ternate, and waged a holy war against the Portuguese. The traditional rival Tidore sided with the Ternateans. The fortress São João Baptista was encircled although the garrison was able to hold out for years. A Portuguese relief fleet approached Ternate later in the same year and was met by a large Ternatan and Tidorese fleet of korakoras (outriggers geared for warfare). A sea battle followed where the Sultan of Tidore was wounded in the leg, while the Portuguese managed to break through and reach the fort. However, the Portuguese position was still precarious. Moreover, Babullah's fleets carried out devastating raids on the Christianized villages of the Moro population in Halmahera. His captains also fought the Portuguese and their allies in Ambon, with mixed success. The Ternateans managed to subjugate Hoamoal (in Seram), Ambelau, Manipa, Kelang, and Boano. The Portuguese troops under the command of captain Sancho de Vasconcellos could keep their Ambonese fortress with great difficulty, and lost much of their grip over the trade in cloves.

For five years the Portuguese and their families endured a harsh blockade on São João Baptista, cut off from the outside world. Sultan Babullah finally gave an ultimatum to leave Ternate within 24 hours. Those who were indigenous in Ternate were allowed to remain on condition that they become royal subjects. The current captain Nuno Pereira de Lacerda accepted the conditions, since the prospects of further resistance were entirely hopeless. Thus, on 15 July 1575, some Portuguese left Ternate and others were allowed to remain as merchants. Babullah showed a measure of moderation, considering the importance of Portuguese Malacca for the spice trade. He allowed Portuguese merchants to still trade and that the prices in cloves were to remain as they had been. Formally, the Sultan vowed to keep the fortress only until his father's murderers had been punished, although he did not actually consider giving up his conquest. A small group of Portuguese remained in Ternate, as hostages. A Portuguese relief armada, arriving too late to change the course of things, took most of the Portuguese on board and sailed over to Ambon where they strengthened the local garrison.

== Tidorean-Portuguese alliance (1578–1605) ==
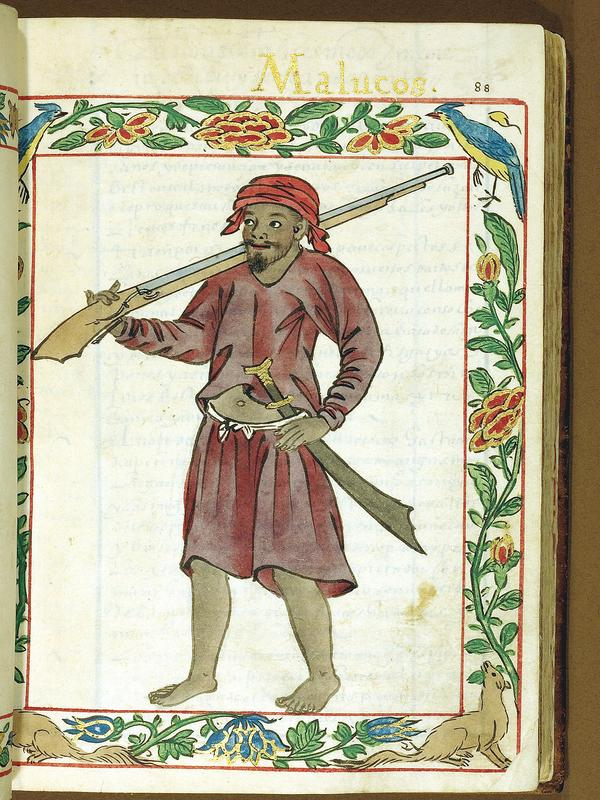
Malukan soldier, late 16th century, from the Boxer Codex

The triumph of Babullah nevertheless evoked anxiety among other political players in the region. The Sultan of Tidore, Gapi Baguna, feared for the hegemony of his victorious neighbor and contacted the Portuguese in Ambon in 1576. Although Babullah discovered his scheming and took him prisoner for a while, he could not stop the Portuguese-Tidorese alliance to take form. A Ternatean invasion of Tidore was carried out, and although Babullah's troops had some success and nearly succeeded in killing Sancho de Vasconcellos, the Portuguese were able to construct a fort on the east side of Tidore in early 1578. It was a strategical arrangement, and there was little love lost between the Portuguese and Tidorese. The new Portuguese stronghold, Fort Reis Magos, was situated north of the later Tidorese capital Soasiu. Although relatively modest, it was sufficient to deter Ternatean aims. Another problem for Babullah was the Bacan Sultanate whose ruler Dom João was a baptized Christian. Although he forced Dom João to give up his Portuguese leanings in about 1575 and poisoned the ruler two years later, Babullah always had to count on the clandestine hostility of the Bacanese. On the whole, Babullah was nevertheless an extremely successful ruler who expanded his realm in all directions in eastern Indonesia and was known as the Lord of Seventy-two Islands. Islam served as a formidable anti-Portuguese uniting force, and its dissemination accelerated.

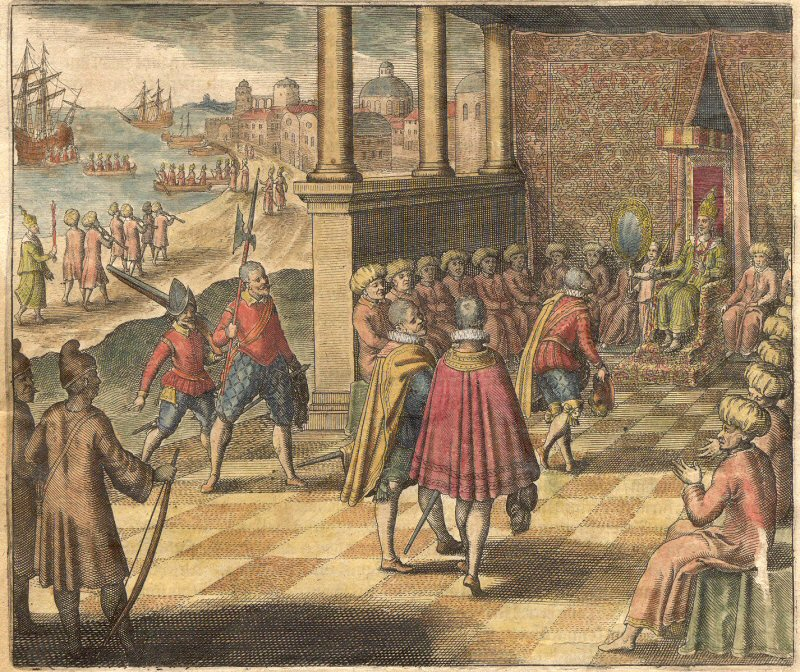
The Drake expedition meets with Sultan Babullah in 1579.

When Francis Drake visited Ternate during his circumnavigation in 1579, Babullah made efforts to ally with the English and suggested a joint attack against the Portuguese fort in Tidore. This was rejected by Drake, though the Sultan gave him a ring as a token of friendship and held expectations of a future Anglo-Ternatean alliance. Babullah also made diplomatic forays towards the Muslim states of Aceh, Johore, Brunei, and West Java, though no concrete enterprise came out of this. More important was assistance from the port cities in Java, whose ships fought the Portuguese positions in Ambon.

=== Spanish intervention ===
The uneasy understanding between the Portuguese traders and Ternate was disturbed by the union between Spain and Portugal in 1581. The Spaniards were by now securely established in the Philippines and had some interest in reaching at the economic resources of the Moluccas. Although the Spanish and Portuguese domains were administratively separated, and trade between them was formally prohibited, Portugal asked for free economic and military support. A series of seaborne expeditions were launched from the Spanish hub of Manila in 1582, 1584, 1585, 1593, and 1603. None of these were successful, and Iberian presence in the region remained limited to Tidore and parts of Ambon.

=== Siege of Tidore ===
What spelt the end of the Portuguese presence was, however, the appearance of the Dutch in 1599. The Sultan of Ternate, Saidi Berkat (r. 1583–1606) immediately entered into diplomatic relations with the European newcomers. Control over the spice trade was an early priority of the Dutch, who were soon to be organized in the East India Company (VOC). Being inveterate enemies of the Catholic Iberian monarchy, the Protestant seafarers seemed to be natural allies with Ternate which, in spite of past victories, still perceived the Philippine colony as an acute threat. On 22 February 1605 a Dutch fleet approached and captured Ambon whose Portuguese garrison quickly surrendered. In the same year, on 19 May, the Dutch commander Cornelis Bastiaensz staged an invasion of Tidore, assisted by Saidi Berkat. The weak fort was taken after a powder explosion rendered further resistance impossible. The defenders fled to the mountains while the Ternatan soldiers eagerly plundered and burnt the houses of their old adversary. The Portuguese settlers with their families were forced to leave Tidore for Manila.

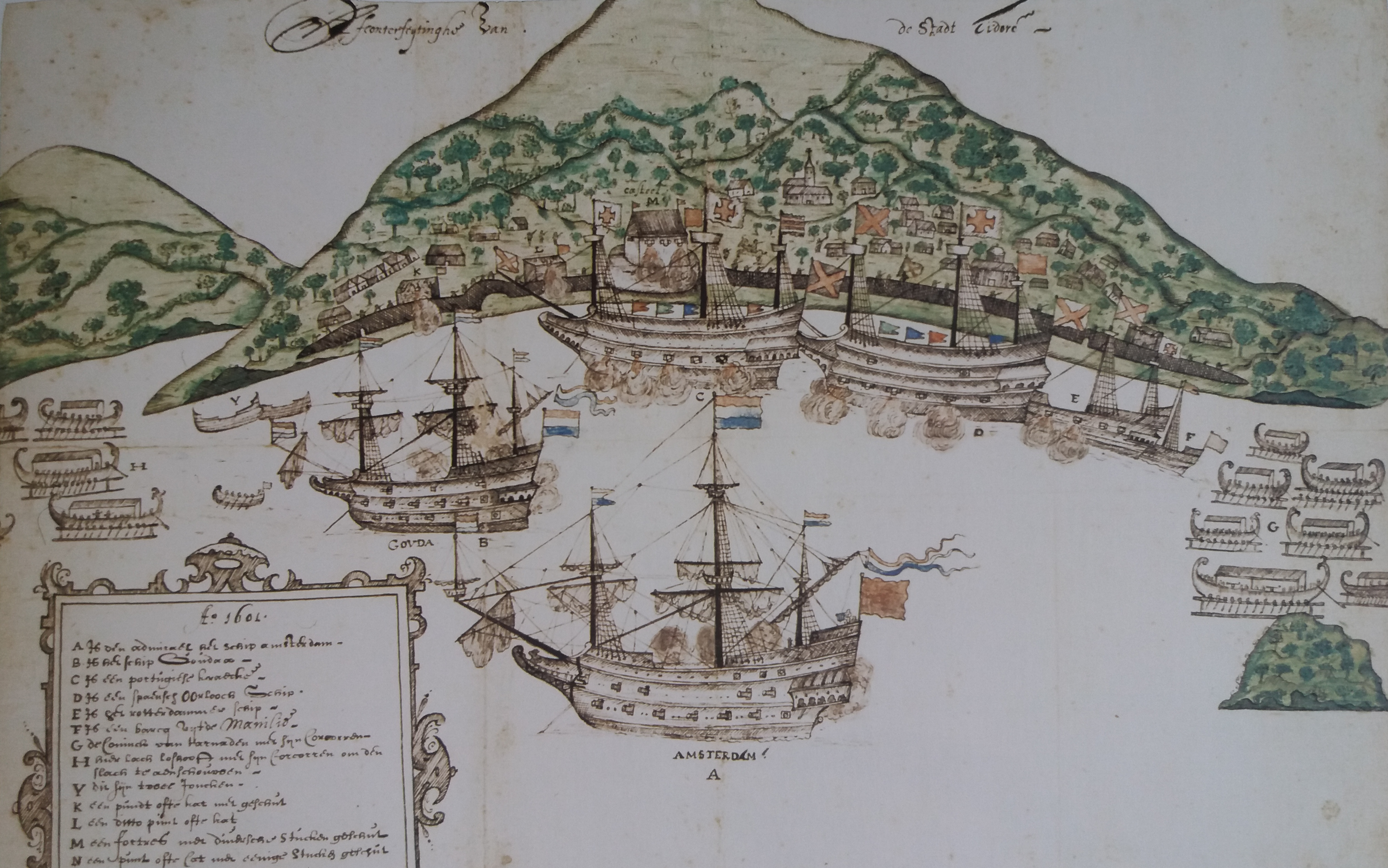
Image of Tidore town in 1601, with Spanish and Dutch ships engaged in a fight. A mosque, a Catholic church and a small fortress can be seen.

The swift Ternatean and Dutch triumph was short-lived, since a large Spanish expedition under Pedro Bravo de Acuña, including a Portuguese contingent, was dispatched from Manila in 1606 and quickly overran Ternate. In the aftermath of the victory, it was decided that Spain rather than Portugal would henceforth control Ternate, although the clove trade was left to the Portuguese. This event, too, did in no way decide the competition between the Dutch-Ternate and Spain-Tidore alliances. Already in the next year 1607, the Dutch East India Company established a stronghold on the east coast of Ternate. This was followed by several decades of warfare and European colonial rivalry, until the Spaniards finally decided to leave the Moluccas altogether in 1663. In this struggle, however, the Portuguese had a limited role. They tried to organize a joint expedition with the Spaniards to defeat the Dutch in Maluku in 1615, but it failed at inception, and the Portuguese were henceforth active only as merchants in the spice trade.

== Legacy ==
The Ternatean–Portuguese struggle, in particular the events in the 1570s, was significant as a rare occasion when an indigenous power of maritime Southeast Asia was able to defeat a European power. The years around 1570 witnessed a coordinated onslaught on the Portuguese possessions in South and Southeast Asia by the Muslim states of the Deccan and Aceh with Ottoman backing. These forays were probably linked with Babullah's efforts. The attacks were largely defeated by the Portuguese, except in the Moluccas where Ternate triumphed. The Ternatean success was crowned by the repeated defeats of the Spanish invasions up to 1603. In that way the process of colonial subordination of the region was significantly delayed, although the Dutch East India Company would strangle Malukan independence in the course of the 17th century.

== See also ==
- Governor of Maluku
- Sultanate of Ternate
- Spice trade
- Portuguese colonialism in Indonesian history
