= Bartolomé Leonardo de Argensola =

Spanish poet and historian (1562–1631)

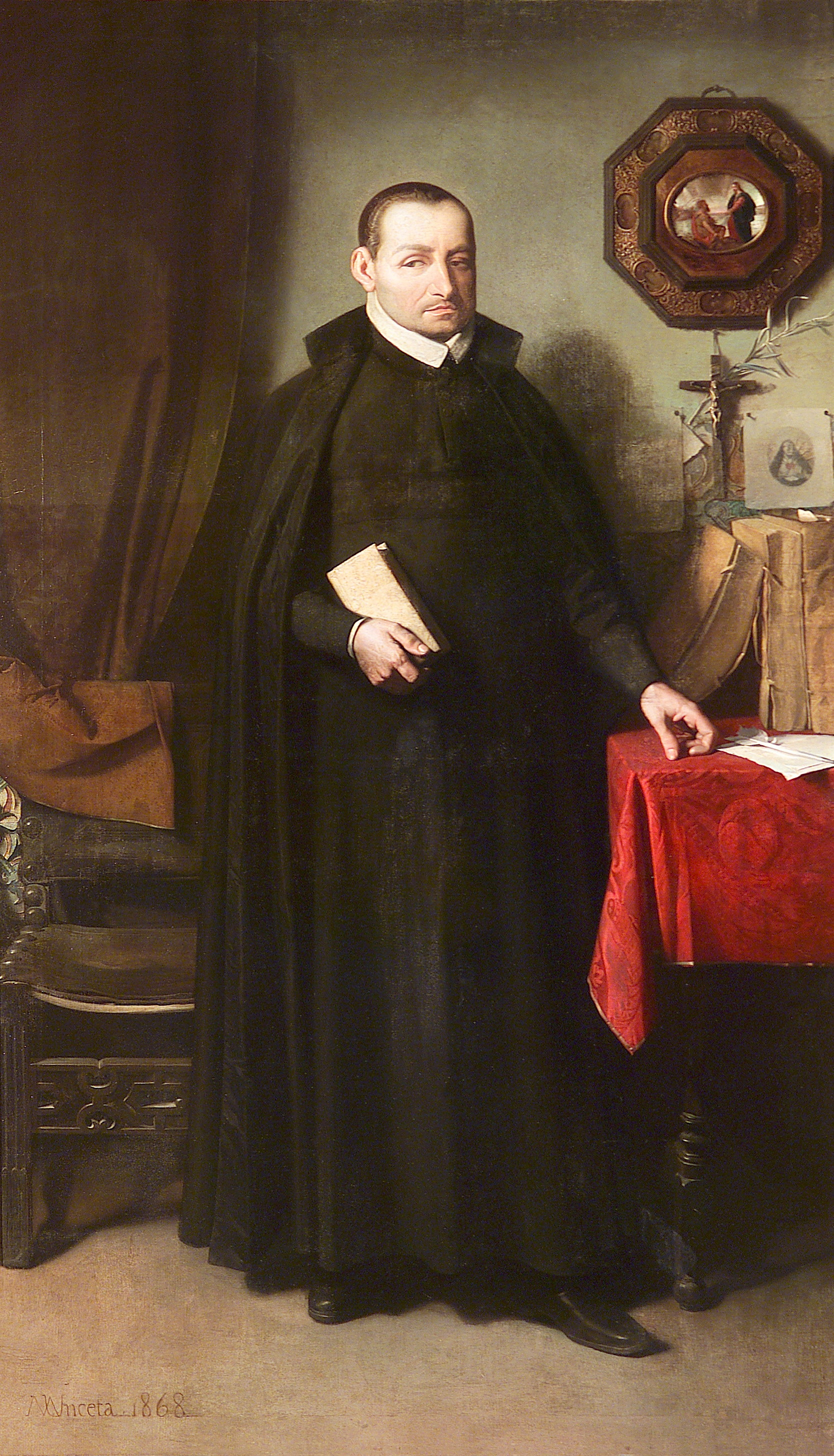
Bartolomé Leonardo de Argensola

Bartolomé Leonardo de Argensola (August 1562 – February 4, 1631) was a Spanish poet and historian.

== Biography ==
Bartolomé Leonardo de Argensola was baptized at Barbastro on August 26, 1562. He studied at Huesca, took orders, and became a protégé of Fernando de Gurrea y Aragón, 5th Duke de Villahermosa. He was presented to the rectory of Villahermosa in 1588. He was attached to the suite of the count de Lemos, viceroy of Naples, in 1610, and succeeded his brother Lupercio as historiographer of Aragon in 1613. He died at Saragossa on February 4, 1631.

== Works ==
His principal prose works are the Conquista de las Islas Molucas (1609), and a supplement to Zurita's Anales de Aragón, which was published in 1630. His commentaries on contemporary events, and his Alteraciones populares, dealing with a Saragossa rising in 1591, are lost.

His poems (1634), like those of his elder brother, are admirably finished examples of pungent wit. His poetry is Classical and he was acclaimed as an ally by Góngora's enemies, but took little part in the controversies. His religious odes (deriving from those of Luis de León) have a Miltonic flavour, e.g. battles in heaven in 'A San Miguel'. He also commands a light, satirical style as when he warns his brother against palmistry, or a pleasing realism as in the description of a country banquet; but in his religious sonnets, he reveals an existentialist malaise.

In the second book of the Conquista de las Islas Molucas, under the title 'Grandeza de la Isla de los Papuas', Bartolomé Leonardo de Argensola reports that the Spaniards call white children born to the black people in New Guinea Albiños. This mentioning is considered the first report of the term, older than the use of the term by Balthazar Telles.

An interesting life of this writer by Father Miguel Mir precedes a reprint of the Conquista de las Islas Molucas, issued at Saragossa in 1891.
