= Patna (disambiguation) =

Patna (formerly Pataliputra) is the capital of Bihar, India.

Patna or Pataliputra and Patliputra may also refer to:

== Places ==
=== India ===
- Patna division, an administrative unit of Bihar
  - Patna district, a district of Bihar state
  - Pataliputra Lok Sabha constituency
  - Patna City, or Patna Sahib, a city and tehsil in Patna district, Bihar
    - Patna Sahib Lok Sabha constituency
    - Patna Sahib Assembly constituency
  - Pataliputra, an ancient Indian capital city at the site of modern Patna
    - Pataliputra capital, a rectangular pillar head of the ruined Mauryan palace at Pataliputra (3rd century BCE)
  - Pataliputra Housing Colony, in Patna, India
  - Patliputra Inter-State Bus Terminal, bus station in Patna, India
  - Patliputra Junction railway station, railway station in Patna, India
  - Patliputra Sports Complex, in Patna, India
  - Patliputra University, in Patna, India
- Patna, Odisha
  - Patna Assembly constituency
  - Patna State, a princely state
- Patna, Rajasthan

=== Elsewhere ===
- Patna, East Ayrshire, Scotland (named after Patna, Bihar)
- Patna, Nepal
- Patna, Virginia, U.S.

== Other uses ==
- Patna (ship), the name of several real and fictional ships
- Patna rice, a variety of long-grain white rice

== See also ==
- Patan (disambiguation)
- Patna railway station (disambiguation)
- Chhota Bheem & Krishna: Patliputra- City of the Dead, a Chhota Bheem film
