= Central Halmahera Regency =

Regency in North Maluku, Indonesia

Central Halmahera Regency Kabupaten Halmahera Tengah
- Regency
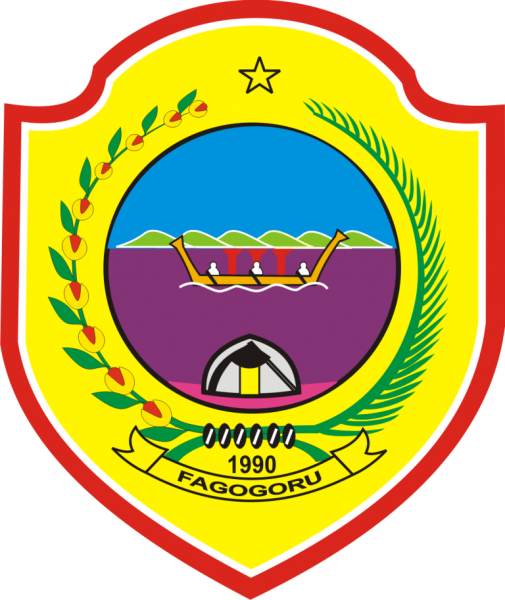
- Coat of arms

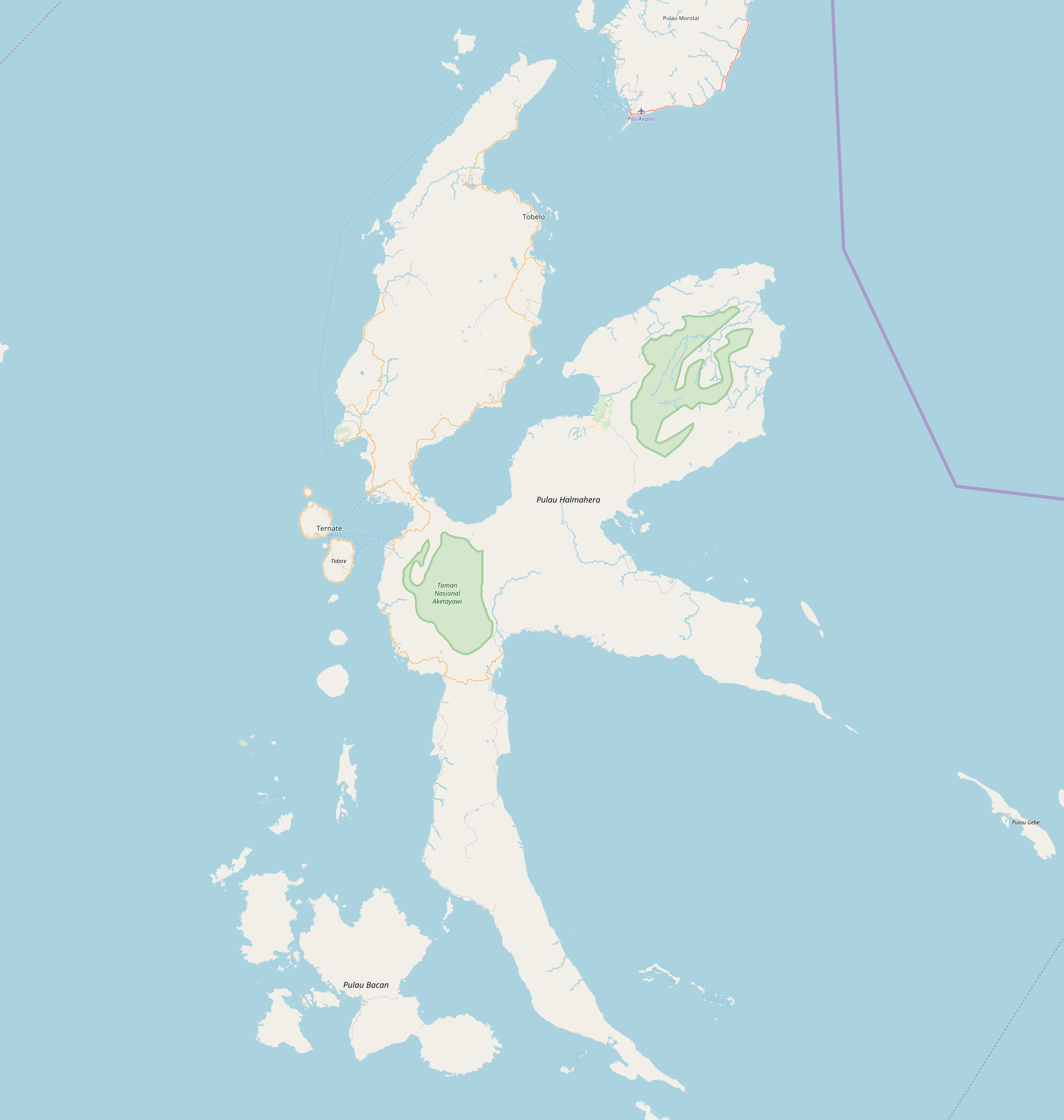
- Location in Maluku, Halmahera and Indonesia Central Halmahera Regency (Halmahera) Central Halmahera Regency (Indonesia)
- Coordinates: 0.4806°N 128.2500°E
- Country: Indonesia
- Province: North Maluku
- Capital: Weda

Government
  - Regent: Ikram Malan Sangadji
  - Vice Regent: Ahlan Djumadil

Area
  - Land: 2,196.16 km^{2} (847.94 sq mi)
  - Water: 6,104.65 km^{2} (2,357.02 sq mi)

Population (mid 2025 estimate)
  - Total: 115,083
  - Density: 43/km^{2} (110/sq mi)
- Time zone: UTC+9 (Indonesia Eastern Time)
- Area code: (+62) 921
- Website: haltengkab.go.id

Central Halmahera Regency (Indonesian: Kabupaten Halmahera Tengah; Indonesian pronunciation: [kabuˌpat̪ɛn halmaˌhera t̪əˈŋah]) is a regency of North Maluku Province, Indonesia. The regency was originally formed on 15 August 1990 from part of the former North Maluku Regency, but on 25 February 2003 more than three-quarters of the land area of the regency were split off to form a separate East Halmahera Regency and the city of Kota Tidore Kepulauan.

The residual Central Halmahera Regency now comprises just the southern half of the southeastern peninsula of Halmahera Island, together with part (the northeastern corner) of the southern peninsula of that island. It is bordered to the north by the East Halmahera Regency, to the west by the city of Kota Tidore Kepulauan, and to the south by South Halmahera Regency and Wedu Bay (the latter being a vast inlet of the Halmahera Sea between the southeastern and southern peninsulas of Halmahera island. To the east it includes islands in the Halmahera Sea (notably the Gebe Islands), and has a maritime border with the Raja Ampat Regency of Southwest Papua Province.

The regency can be divided geographically into a western sector (the five "Weda" districts) and an eastern sector (the four "Patani" districts plus the outlying island group - Pulau Gebe - to the southeast). These two sectors have no official status. The western sector covers a land area of 1,630.78 km^{2} with a population of 81,386 in mid 2025. The eastern sector covers a land area of 565.38 km^{2} with a population of 33,697 in mid 2025.

The regency altogether covers a land area of 2,196.16 km^{2}, together with a related sea area of 6,104.65 km^{2}, to give a total of 8,300.81 km^{2}; thus about 73% of the regency's area is sea. It had a population of 42,815 at the 2010 Census and 56,802 at the 2020 Census; the official estimate as at mid 2022 was 59,096, but the official estimate for mid 2023 produced a massive and as yet unexplained rise to 96,977 persons (comprising 59,884 males and 37,093 females), and this rose again to 106,500 as of mid-2024 (comprising 67,500 males and 39,000 females), and to 115,083 as at mid 2025 (comprising 74,713 males and 40,370 females). The capital lies at the town of Weda in the southwest of the regency.

== Economy ==
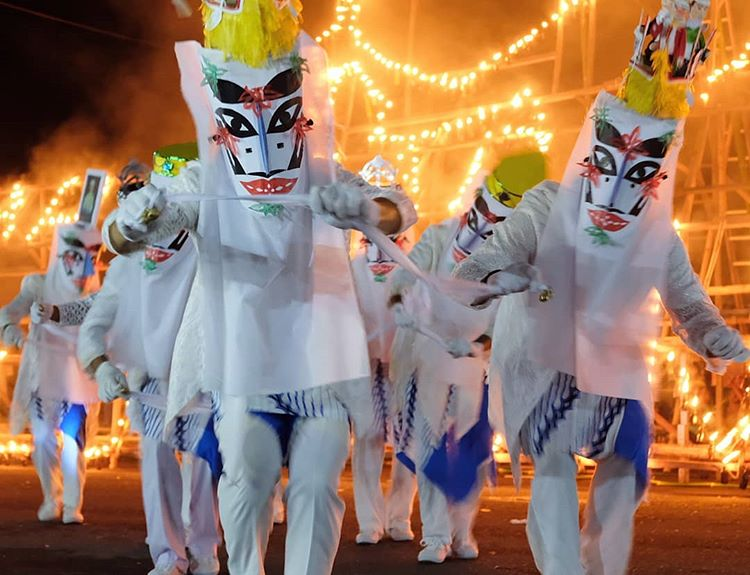
Coka Iba Dance

The regency is site of the Weda Bay Industrial Park, a nickel mining and processing site.

== Administration ==
The regency was divided as of 2010 into eight districts (kecamatan), but subsequently two further kecamatan have been created (Weda Timur and Patani Timur). The districts are tabulated below with their areas and their populations at the 2010 Census and the 2020 Census, together with the official estimates as of mid-2022, mid-2023, at mid 2024 and mid-2025. The table also includes the locations of the district administrative centres, the number of administrative villages (all classed as rural desa) in each district, and its postal code.

Kode Wilayah	Name of District (kecamatan)	English name	Area in km^{2}	Pop'n Census 2010	Pop'n Census 2020	Pop'n Estimate mid 2022	Pop'n Estimate mid 2023 ^{(a)}	Pop'n Estimate mid 2024 ^{(a)}	Pop'n Estimate mid 2025 ^{(a)}	Admin centre	No. of Villages	Post Code
82.02.05	Weda Selatan	South Weda	176.61	4,850	6,537	6,845	8,552	8,752	9,118	Wairoro Indah	8	97851
82.02.01	Weda ^{(b)}	(Southwest Weda)	146.60	6,677	12,016	12,918	36,641	38,747	37,166	Were	7	97850
82.02.07	Weda Tengah	Central Weda	491.97	3,942	6,001	6,427	13,282	18,710	21,756	Lelilef Waibulan	7	97853
82.02.04	Weda Utara ^{(c)}	North Weda	468.01	6,200	4,765	4,884	7,856	9,065	9,847	Sagea	5	97854
82.02.09	Weda Timur	East Weda	347.59	^{(d)}	2,717	2,785	3,263	3,322	3,499	Messa	4	97852
82.02.08	Patani Barat	West Patani	182.39	3,634	4,325	4,421	5,090	5,318	6,275	Banemo	5	97856
82.02.10	Patani Timur	East Patani	108.80	^{(e)}	3,710	3,765	4,193	4,201	4,681	Peniti	6	97857
82.02.06	Patani Utara ^{(f)}	North Patani	26.87	8,949	6,553	6,650	7,309	7,292	8,498	Tepeleo	6	97858
82.02.02	Patani ^{(g)}	(Southeast Patani)	70.11	3,920	4,535	4,610	4,777	4,902	7,831	Kipai	5	97855
82.02.03	Pulau Gebe ^{(h)}	Gebe Island	180.21	4,643	5,643	5,791	6,014	6,191	6,412	Kapaleo	8	97859
	Totals		2,196.16	42,815	56,802	59,096	96,977	106,500	115,083	Weda	64	

Notes: (a) the reported figures for mid 2022 and those for subsequent mid years are plainly incompatible, but those given here are simply the figures printed in the published reports by the Regency-level office of the Indonesian Statistics Board (Badan Pusat Statistik).
(b) includes 24 small offshore islands. (c) includes 2 offshore islands (Pulau Mintu and Pulau Tete).
(d) the 2010 population for East Weda District is included with the figure for North Weda District, from which it was cut out.
(e) the 2010 population for East Patani District is included with the figure for North Patani District, from which it was cut out.
(f) includes 4 offshore islands (Pulau Jiu, Pulau Liwo, Pulau Mailiyet and Pulau Sayafi).
(g) includes 3 offshore islands (Pulau Moor, Pulau Weilon and Pulau Witimdi).
(h) comprises 9 islands (Pulau Fau, Pulau Gebe, Pulau Kiyas, Pulau Piyai, Pulau Sain, Pulau Tapau Kali, Pulau Tapau Piai, Pulau Uta and Pulau Yoi) lying southeast of the Patani Peninsula and about 50 km west of the Northern Raja Ampat Islands.

== Villages (desa) ==
The 64 villages are listed below, along with their populations as at mid 2024.

Weda Selatan comprises the 8 villages of Tilope (657 inhabitants), Sosowomo (1,113), Loleo (1,265), Wairoro Indah (1,418), Kluting Jaya (1,431), Lembar Asri (762), Sumber Asri (824) and Air Salobar (1,282). Weda (situated between Weda Selatan and Weda Tengah) comprises the 7 villages of Nusliko (759 inhabitants), Were (10,137), Fidi Jaya (17,052), Sidanga (881), Nurweda (5,765), Wedana (3,612) and Goeng (541). Weda Tengah comprises the 7 villages of Lililef Waibulan (7,816 inhabitants), Lililef Sawai (6,676), Sawai Itepo (1,243), Kobe (926), Woekob (832), Woejerana (616) and Kulo Jaya (601). Weda Utara comprises the 5 villages of Gemaf (2,765 inhabitants), Sagea (2,489), Fritu (1,120), Waleh (1,490) and Kiya (1,201). Weda Timur comprises the 4 villages of Dotte (912 inhabitants), Messa (644), Kotalo (809) and Yeke (957).

Patani Barat comprises the 5 villages of Banemo (837 inhabitants), Bobane Jaya (1,848), Bobane Indah (1,092), Mareala (1,030) and Sibenpopo (511). Patani Timur (which covers the northern half of the narrow eastern projection) comprises the 6 villages of Sakam (579 inhabitants), Nursifa (497), Damuli (742), Peniti (836), Masure (1,089) and Palo (458). Patani Utara comprises the 6 villages of Gemia (1,268 inhabitants), Tepeleo (1,686), Bilifitu (1,291), Tepeleo Batu Dua (1,497), Pantura Jaya (859) and Maliforo (691). Patani (which covers the southern half of the narrow eastern projection) comprises the 5 villages of Wailegi (817 inhabitants), Kipai (1,262), Yeisowo (1,024), Yondeliu (1,248) and Baka Jaya (551). Pulau Gebe (which covers the far-flung Gebe Islands) comprises the 8 villages of Kapaleo (1,384 inhabitants), Kacepi (895), Sanafi (573), Umera (714), Umiyal (705), Sonof Kacepo (444), Elfanun (1,010) and Yam (466).

== Demography ==
The majority of the population in the regency speak South Halmahera languages, a branch of the Austronesian languages, including Sawai, Patani and Gebe, whereas the regencies to the north and west generally speak North Halmahera languages (which are non-Austronesian).
