= Gebe Airport =

Gebe Airport Bandar Udara Gebe
- IATA: GEB; ICAO: WAEJ

Summary
- Location: Gebe, Central Halmahera Regency, North Maluku, Indonesia
- Time zone: Indonesia Eastern Time (+9)
- Coordinates: 0.079737°S 129.457881°E

Map
- Location in Maluku Islands Location in Indonesia

Gebe Airport (IATA: GEB, ICAO: WAEJ) is located in Gebe, Central Halmahera Regency, North Maluku, Indonesia.
