= Pashto (disambiguation) =

Pashto is an Eastern Iranian language, spoken by the Pashtun tribes in Pakistan and Afghanistan.

Pashto or Poshtu may also refer to:

- Poshtu, Bushehr, a village in Bushehr Province, Iran
- Poshtu, Hormozgan, a village in Hormozgan Province, Iran
- Pashto, Battagram, a union council town in Battagram District, Khyber Pakhtunkhwa, Pakistan

== See also ==
- Pathan (disambiguation)
- Pashto alphabet
- Pashto grammar
- Pashto literature and poetry
- Pashto media
- Pashto music
- Pashtuns
- Pashtunwali
