= South Halmahera languages =

Branch of Austronesian languages

South Halmahera
- Geographic distribution: Maluku Islands
- Linguistic classification: Austronesian: Malayo-Polynesian; Central–Eastern Malayo-Polynesian; Eastern Malayo-Polynesian; South Halmahera–West New Guinea; Raja Ampat–South Halmahera; South Halmahera
- Proto-language: Proto-South Halmahera
- Subdivisions: Gebe; Central–Eastern; Southern

Language codes
- Glottolog: sout3231

The South Halmahera languages are the branch of Austronesian languages found along the southeast coast of the island of Halmahera in the Indonesian province of North Maluku.

Most of the languages are only known from short word lists, but Taba and Buli are fairly well attested.

They are not related to the North Halmahera languages, which are non-Austronesian. However, Ternatan influence is considerable, a legacy of the historical dominance of the Ternate Sultanate.

== Historical morphology ==
Reconstructions of subject markers and inalienable possessive markers for Raja Ampat–South Halmahera proto-languages according to Kamholz (2015). Note that V = vocalic conjugation, C = consonantal conjugation:

Proto-South Halmahera:

1sg.	*k-, *y- (V), *k-, *-y- (C)	1pl.	*t- (incl.), *am-, *k- (excl.)
2sg.	*my- (V), *m-y- (C)	2pl.	*f-
3sg.	*n- (V), *n- (C)	3pl.	*d-

1sg.	*-g	1pl.	*-d (incl.), *-mam (excl.)
2sg.	*-m	2pl.	*-meu
3sg.	*-∅	3pl.	*si-...-ri

Proto-Central-Eastern South Halmahera:

1sg.	*k-, *y- (V), *k-, *-i- (C)	1pl.	*t- (incl.), *k- (excl.)
2sg.	*my- (V), *m-i- (C)	2pl.	*f-
3sg.	*n- (V), *n- (C)	3pl.	*d-

1sg.	*a-...-g	1pl.	*ite-...-r (incl.), *ma-...-mam (excl.)
2sg.	*a-...-m	2pl.	*meu-...-meu
3sg.	*i-	3pl.	*si-...-ri

Proto-Southern South Halmahera:

1sg.	*k- (V), *k- (C)	1pl.	*t- (incl.), *am- (excl.)
2sg.	*m- (V), *m- (C)	2pl.	*f-
3sg.	*n- (V), *n- (C)	3pl.	*d-?

Most Gane and Taba dialects descending from Proto-Southern South Halmahera lost the inalienable possession suffixes. However, evidence from the Tahane dialect of Taba (Collins 1982) suggests that inalienable possession should be reconstructed for Proto-Southern South Halmahera, albeit in relic forms (compare Tahane mta-g "my eye", nim mta-m "your eye", and nim mta "his/her/its eye").

== Languages ==
From Kamholz (2024):

- South Halmahera
  - Gebe (spoken on Gebe island between Halmahera and Raja Ampat)
  - Central–Eastern South Halmahera
    - Buli
    - Maba
    - Patani
    - Sawai
  - Southern South Halmahera
    - Gane
    - Taba (East Makian)

From Glottolog:

- South Halmahera
  - East Makian–Gane (Southern South Halmahera)
    - East Makian (Taba)
    - Gane
  - Gebeic
    - Gebe (spoken on Gebe island between Halmahera and Raja Ampat)
    - Central–Eastern South Halmahera
      - Buli
      - Gamrange
        - Sawai
        - Southern Gamrange
          - Maba
          - Patani

== Lexical reconstructions ==
Reconstruction of lexemes found in Proto-South Halmahera according to Zobel (ongoing), cited from Arnold (2025).

Proto-South Halmahera	Gloss
*giəs	'areca nut'
*sopi	'to bathe'
*masə (?)	'low tide'
*fen(V)	'sea turtle'
*topi	'sugarcane'
*toli	'three'

Reconstruction of lexemes found in Proto-Southern South Halmahera according to Zobel (ongoing).

Proto-Southern South Halmahera	Gloss
*ˈdɛwa	'grass'
*ˈdɔba	'garden'
*ˈkiu	'fear'
*ˈkobit	'knife'
*ˈkuy-ô	'fingernail'
*ˈlɛbo	'flame'
*ˈlekat	'bad'
*ˈlilas	'lightning'
*ˈpokal	'short'
*ˈpoy-ô	'head'
*ˈsɛpo	'fruit'
*ˈtakis	'sea water'
*ˈtɛbal	'shoot'
*ˈuat	'mountain'
*ˈweli	'rattan'
*aˈwɔyan	'right'
*baˈtɔl	'star'
*faˈɔn/aˈfɔn	'eat'
*haˈmasik	'rice'
*kaˈbus	'wet'
*kVkˈle	'hair'
*mˈnɔpa	'wide'
*maˈdimal	'yellow'
*maˈleo	'other'
*mei	'who'
*nɔn	'sharp'
*tes	'not'

Reconstruction of lexemes found in Proto-Gamrange (per Glottolog) according to Zobel (ongoing).

Proto-Gamrange	Gloss
#dea	'stupid'
#fVwɔw	'make sago'
#p(i)on-ô	'fruit'
#til	'support'
#tVgy[o/u]	'hungry'
*afĭt	'stick'
*atĭl	'pull'
*babăl	'cold'
*bat-ô	'all'
*bVblahĭ	'embers'
*d[e/o]yĭ	'crab'
*dubă ŋaŋĭh-ô	'thunderstone'
*felăh	'rain'
*g[e/o]gĭ	'mangrove'
*gaă	'catch, pick up'
*gVlepăs	'slippery'
*iŋit	'reap, gather'
*lagăy	'tray, winnow'
*lală	'lie, deceive'
*lawă-lawă	'slowly'
*mamufă	'tame'
*mdi-ô	'stem, trunk'
*miamă	'small'
*mVlikV	'cloud'
*namă-namă	'eat, food'
*natăh	'again'
*pek₂ĭt	'break'
*pidVs	'peel'
*podăs	'split, break open'
*puăh	'where'
*pVk₂puk₂[ă/ĭ]	'bump'
*sagĭh	'sugar palm'
*sak₂ĭh	'thigh'
*salĭy	'crawl'
*salĭy	'set loose'
*sefă	'crawl'
*sifsefă	'cuscus'
*slemă	'sexually active'
*sniV	'month, moon'
*spalĭ	'half'
*sVbibVh	'midwife'
*sVl-silVŋ	'straits'
*tisV	'no, not'
*tuk₂ăh	'fold'
*tVlelă	'surprised'
*ulăt	'sarong'
*yelĭ	'boat'
