= Pathan (disambiguation) =

Pathans, also known as Pashtuns, are an ethnic group in Pakistan and Afghanistan.

Pathan or Pathans may also refer to:

== Arts and entertainment ==
- Pathan joke, a derogatory joke
- The Pathans, a 1957 book by Olaf Caroe
- Pathan (film), a 1962 Indian Urdu-language film
- Pathaan (film), a 2023 Indian spy film by Siddharth Anand, starring Shah Rukh Khan
  - Pathaan (YRF Spy Universe), fictional Indian spy portrayed by Khan appearing in YRF Spy Universe films
  - Pathaan (soundtrack), soundtrack of the film by Vishal–Shekhar and Sanchit and Ankit Balhara

== People ==
- Abdul Motaleb Khan Pathan, Bangladeshi politician
- Agha Javed Pathan (1972–2018), Pakistani doctor and political activist from Sindh
- Alshaaz Pathan (born 1994), Indian cricketer from Gujarat
- Asad Pathan (born 1984), Indian cricketer from Gujarat
- Babashafi Pathan (born 1994), Indian cricketer from Gujarat
- Ghayasuddin Pathan, Pakistani politician from East Pakistan
- Hanif Pathan (1901–1989), Bangladeshi folklorist and antiquarian
- Irfan Pathan (born 1984), Indian cricketer from Gujarat
- Rayyan Pathan (born 1991), Canadian cricketer
- M.A. Pathan (born 1942), Indian businessman
- Mobarak Ali Pathan, Indian politician from Assam
- Nurul Amin Khan Pathan, Bangladeshi politician
- Nuzhat Pathan (born 1965), Pakistani politician from Sindh
- Reshma Pathan, Indian stuntwoman and actress, known as the "Sholay Girl"
- Waris Pathan (born 1968), Indian lawyer and politician from Maharashtra
- Wuttikrai Pathan (born 1995), Thai football player
- Yusuf Pathan (born 1982), Indian cricketer from Gujarat
- Yusufkhan Mohamadkhan Pathan (born 1930), Indian academic and writer from Maharashtra
- Swab Phaoprathan or Sawab Khan Pathan, Pakistani-Thai businessman and politician
- Farooque or Akbar Hossain Pathan (born 1940), Bangladeshi actor and politician

== Other uses ==
- Sunbeam Pathan, 1920s British piston aircraft engine
- Pathan Regiment, a former infantry regiment of Pakistan Army

== See also ==
- Patan (disambiguation)
- Pattani (disambiguation)
- Pashto (disambiguation)
- Parthian (disambiguation)
- Pashtunization or Pathanization, adapting to Pashtun language or culture
- Pathani, a Rajput clan of Uttarakhand, India
- Pathania, a Rajput clan of Himachal Pradesh, India
- 40th Pathans, an infantry regiment of the British Indian Army
- RFA War Pathan, a 1923 tanker of the British Royal Fleet Auxiliary
