= Pattani =

Pattani (or Patani in Malay spelling) may refer to:

== Places ==
=== Continental Asia ===
- Patani (historical region), a historical region in the Malay peninsula, in Thailand and Malaysia.
- Pattani province, modern province in southern Thailand
  - Pattani, Thailand, the capital of the province
  - Mueang Pattani district, the district that includes the town
- Patani Kingdom, a former semi-independent Malay sultanate
  - Monthon Pattani, an administrative subdivision (monthon) in the early 20th century and follow-up to the kingdom
- Pattani River

=== Elsewhere ===
- Patani, Nigeria, a town in Delta State, Nigeria
- Patani, Indonesia, a village in North Maluku, Indonesia

== Other uses ==
- HTMS Pattani (OPV 511), a Royal Thai Navy vessel
- Pattani F.C., a football club of the town of Pattani
- Pattani language, a Himalayan language of India
- Kelantan–Pattani Malay, a Malayan language spoken in the Patani region
- Silat Pattani, a style of silat
- Patani FC, a former football club of Yerevan, Armenia
- Disha Patani, Indian actress and model
- Patani language, an Austronesian language of Halmahera, Indonesia
- Patani or Lima beans in Philippines.

== See also ==
- Patni (disambiguation)
- Patan (disambiguation)
- Pathan (disambiguation)
- Hikayat Patani, a semi-legendary set of tales about the Pattani kingdom of Thailand
- Pathani, a Rajput clan of Uttarakhand, India
- Pathania, a Rajput clan of Himachal Pradesh, India
