= Patan =

Patan may refer to several places:

== India ==
- Patan, Chhattisgarh
  - Patan, Chhattisgarh Assembly constituency
- Patan, Gujarat
  - Patan district
  - Patan Lok Sabha constituency
  - Patan, Gujarat Assembly constituency
- Patan, Madhya Pradesh
  - Patan, Madhya Pradesh Assembly constituency
- Patan, Maharashtra
  - Patan, Maharashtra Assembly constituency
- Patan, Mawal, Maharashtra
- Patan, Rajasthan
- Patan, Udaipur, Rajasthan
- Patan block, an administrative block of Palamu district, Jharkhand state
- Pattan, Jammu and Kashmir
- -patnam or patan, place name element in India, meaning "town"

== Nepal ==
- Patan, Nepal, or Lalitpur
  - Patan Durbar Square
- Patan, Baitadi

== Pakistan ==
- Pattan Tehsil, Khyber Pakhtunkhwa province

== See also ==
- Pattani (disambiguation)
- Pathan (disambiguation)
- Patna (disambiguation)
