= BZQ =

BZQ or bzq may refer to:

- Bolzano/Bozen railway station (IATA: BZQ), the main station of Bolzano, South Tyrol, Italy
- Buli language (Indonesia) (ISO 639-3: bzq), an Austronesian language of southern Halmahera, Indonesia
- Seneca Polytechnic, by ICAO airline designator
