= Weda =

- Kecamatan
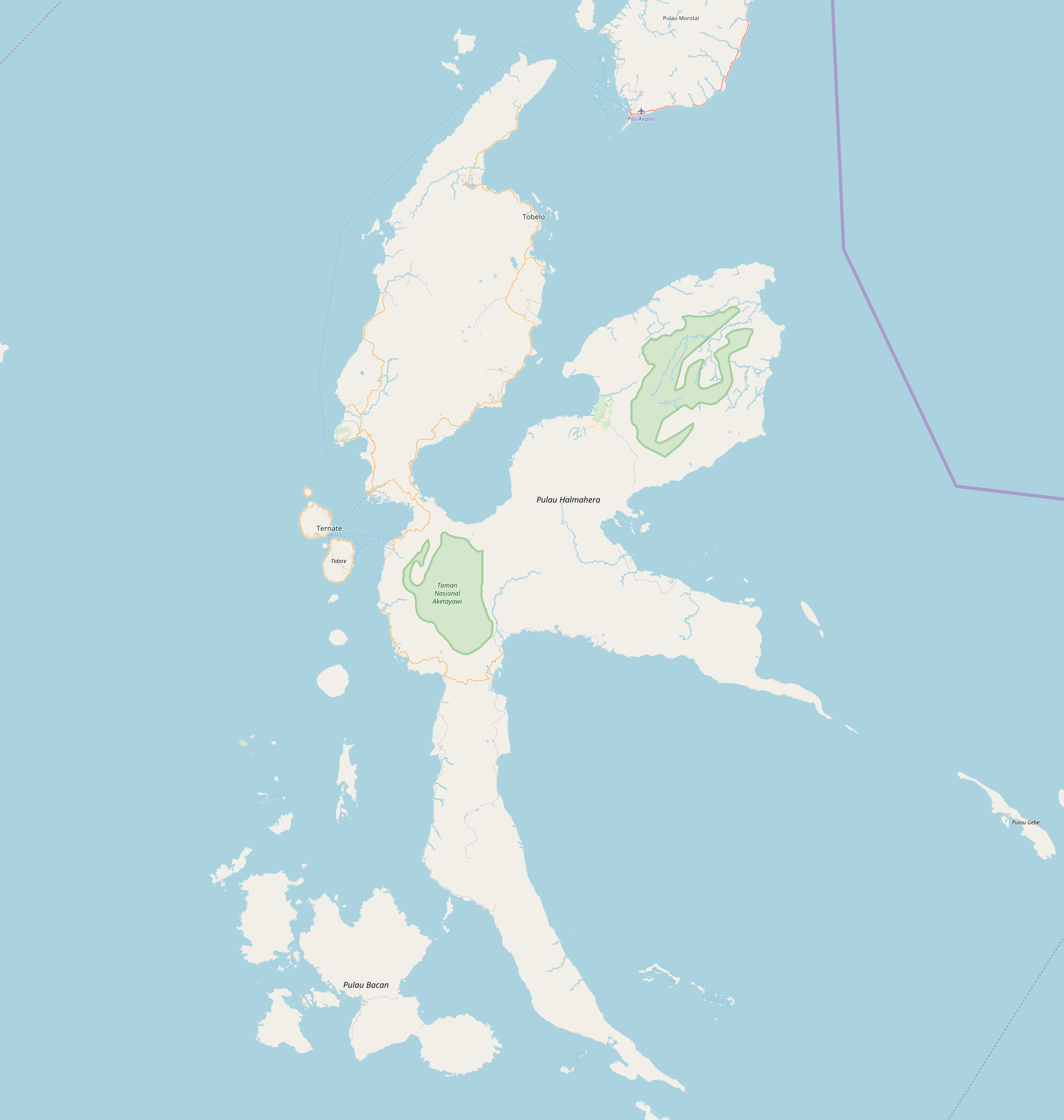
- Location of the town in Halmahera
- Coordinates: 0°19′33″N 127°52′30″E
- Country: Indonesia
- Province: North Maluku
- Island: Halmahera
- Regency: Central Halmahera Regency

Government
  - Type: District

Area
  - Total: 146.6 km^{2} (56.6 sq mi)

Population (2010 Census)
  - Total: 6,677
  - Density: 45.55/km^{2} (118.0/sq mi)
- Time zone: UTC+9 (WIB)

Weda is a district in North Maluku, Indonesia, located on the east coast of Halmahera, the largest of the Maluku Islands. The district includes 24 small offshore islands. Its administrative centre is the village of Were, which is also the capital of the Central Halmahera Regency. The Sawai language is spoken in Weda.

Weda has an eco resort that is focused on maintaining the fragile ecology of the area. They provide diving packages and snorkeling excursions to visitors. Weda Resort provides birdwatching, in great comfort, from the terrace of the resort. Weda is one of the most interesting birdwatching destinations in Indonesia. Nearby are the Boki Maruru caves, Nusliko ponds, and other areas of interest.

== Climate ==
Weda has a tropical rainforest climate (Af) with moderate rainfall in October and November and heavy rainfall in the remaining months.

Climate data for Weda
Month	Jan	Feb	Mar	Apr	May	Jun	Jul	Aug	Sep	Oct	Nov	Dec	Year
Mean daily maximum °C (°F)	29.5 (85.1)	29.6 (85.3)	29.6 (85.3)	30.2 (86.4)	29.9 (85.8)	29.6 (85.3)	29.1 (84.4)	29.8 (85.6)	29.9 (85.8)	30.2 (86.4)	30.7 (87.3)	29.5 (85.1)	29.8 (85.6)
Daily mean °C (°F)	26.0 (78.8)	26.0 (78.8)	26.1 (79.0)	26.5 (79.7)	26.4 (79.5)	26.2 (79.2)	25.8 (78.4)	26.3 (79.3)	26.1 (79.0)	26.2 (79.2)	26.9 (80.4)	26.0 (78.8)	26.2 (79.2)
Mean daily minimum °C (°F)	22.6 (72.7)	22.5 (72.5)	22.6 (72.7)	22.9 (73.2)	22.9 (73.2)	22.8 (73.0)	22.5 (72.5)	22.8 (73.0)	22.3 (72.1)	22.3 (72.1)	23.1 (73.6)	22.5 (72.5)	22.7 (72.8)
Average rainfall mm (inches)	138 (5.4)	143 (5.6)	153 (6.0)	143 (5.6)	248 (9.8)	265 (10.4)	327 (12.9)	257 (10.1)	133 (5.2)	91 (3.6)	112 (4.4)	142 (5.6)	2,152 (84.6)
Source: Climate-Data.org
