= Gane language =

Austronesian language spoken in North Maluku, Indonesia

Gane
- Native to: Indonesia
- Region: North Maluku
- Native speakers: (2,900 cited 1982)
- Language family: Austronesian: Malayo-Polynesian; Central–Eastern Malayo-Polynesian; Eastern Malayo-Polynesian; South Halmahera–West New Guinea; Raja Ampat–South Halmahera; South Halmahera; Southern; Gane

Language codes
- ISO 639-3: gzn
- Glottolog: gane1237

Gane is an Austronesian language of southern Halmahera, Indonesia, spoken by the Gane people. There are estimated to be roughly 5800 native speakers of the language. It is closely related to the Taba language.
