= Patni =

Patni may refer to:

- Patni (surname), a Digambara Jain family name from India
- Patni caste, a Rajput and Brahman caste in Uttrakhand
- Patni Computer Systems, an Indian information technology company
- Patni (film), a 1970 Indian Hindi-language film featuring Ramesh Deo

== See also ==
- Patani (disambiguation)
