= Riz, Iran =

City in Bushehr province, Iran

Riz Persian: ريز
- City
- Location within Iran
- Coordinates: 28°03′03″N 52°05′00″E
- Country: Iran
- Province: Bushehr
- County: Jam
- District: Riz

Population (2016)
  - Total: 3,282
- Time zone: UTC+3:30 (IRST)

Riz (Persian: ريز) (Note: Also romanized as Rīz) is a city in, and the capital of, Riz District in Jam County, Bushehr province, Iran. It also serves as the administrative center for Riz Rural District.

== Demographics ==
=== Population ===
At the time of the 2006 National Census, the city's population was 1,802 in 415 households. The following census in 2011 counted 2,405 people in 641 households. The 2016 census measured the population of the city as 3,282 people in 944 households.
