= Qaleh Kohneh, Bushehr =

Village in Bushehr province, Iran

Qaleh Kohneh Persian: قلعه كهنه
- Village
- Location within Iran
- Coordinates: 28°03′20″N 52°04′39″E
- Country: Iran
- Province: Bushehr
- County: Jam
- District: Riz
- Rural District: Riz

Population (2016)
  - Total: 267
- Time zone: UTC+3:30 (IRST)

Qaleh Kohneh (Persian: قلعه كهنه) (Note: Also romanized as Qal‘eh Kohneh and Qal‘eh-ye Kohneh; also known as Kūhneh and Qal‘eh Kuhneh) is a village in Riz Rural District of Riz District in Jam County, Bushehr province, Iran.

== Demographics ==
=== Population ===
At the time of the 2006 National Census, the village's population was 336 in 78 households. The following census in 2011 counted 275 people in 69 households. The 2016 census measured the population of the village as 267 people in 85 households.
