= Hoseynabad, Riz =

Village in Bushehr province, Iran

Hoseynabad Persian: حسين اباد
- Village
- Location within Iran
- Coordinates: 28°03′12″N 52°03′38″E
- Country: Iran
- Province: Bushehr
- County: Jam
- District: Riz
- Rural District: Riz

Population (2016)
  - Total: 342
- Time zone: UTC+3:30 (IRST)

Hoseynabad (Persian: حسين اباد) (Note: Also romanized as Ḩoseynābād) is a village in Riz Rural District of Riz District in Jam County, Bushehr province, Iran.

== Demographics ==
=== Population ===
At the time of the 2006 National Census, the village's population was 288 in 62 households. The following census in 2011 counted 323 people in 76 households. The 2016 census measured the population of the village as 342 people in 97 households.
