= Sofifi =

Capital district of North Maluku, Indonesia

- Town
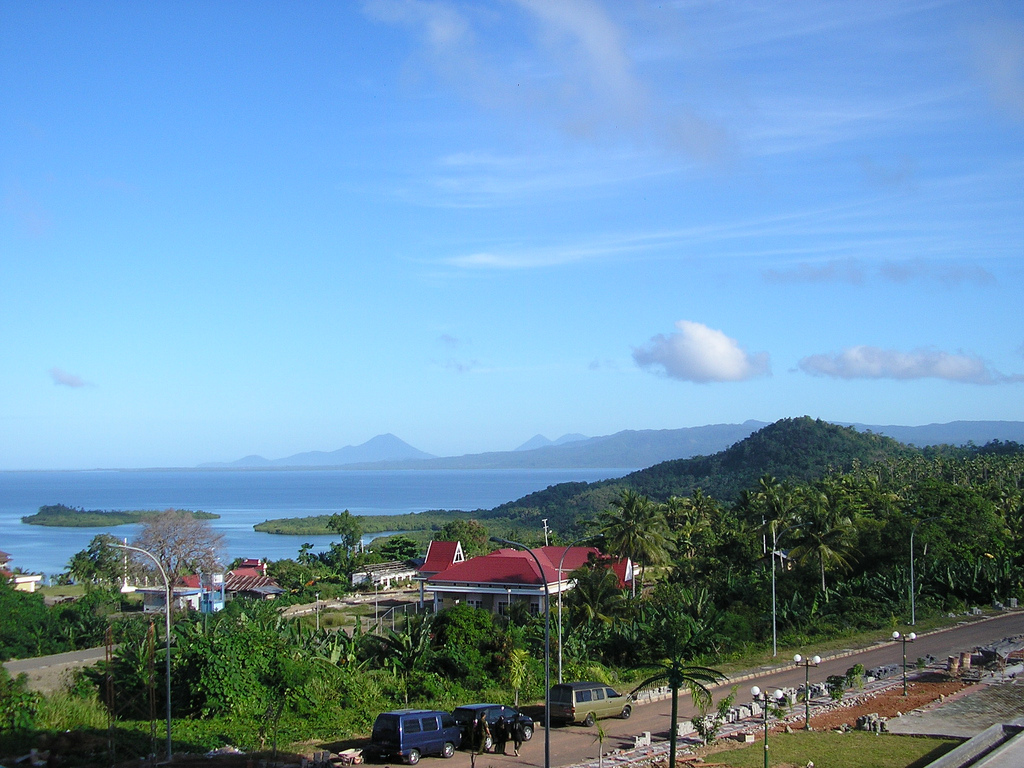
- View of the town
- Interactive map of Sofifi
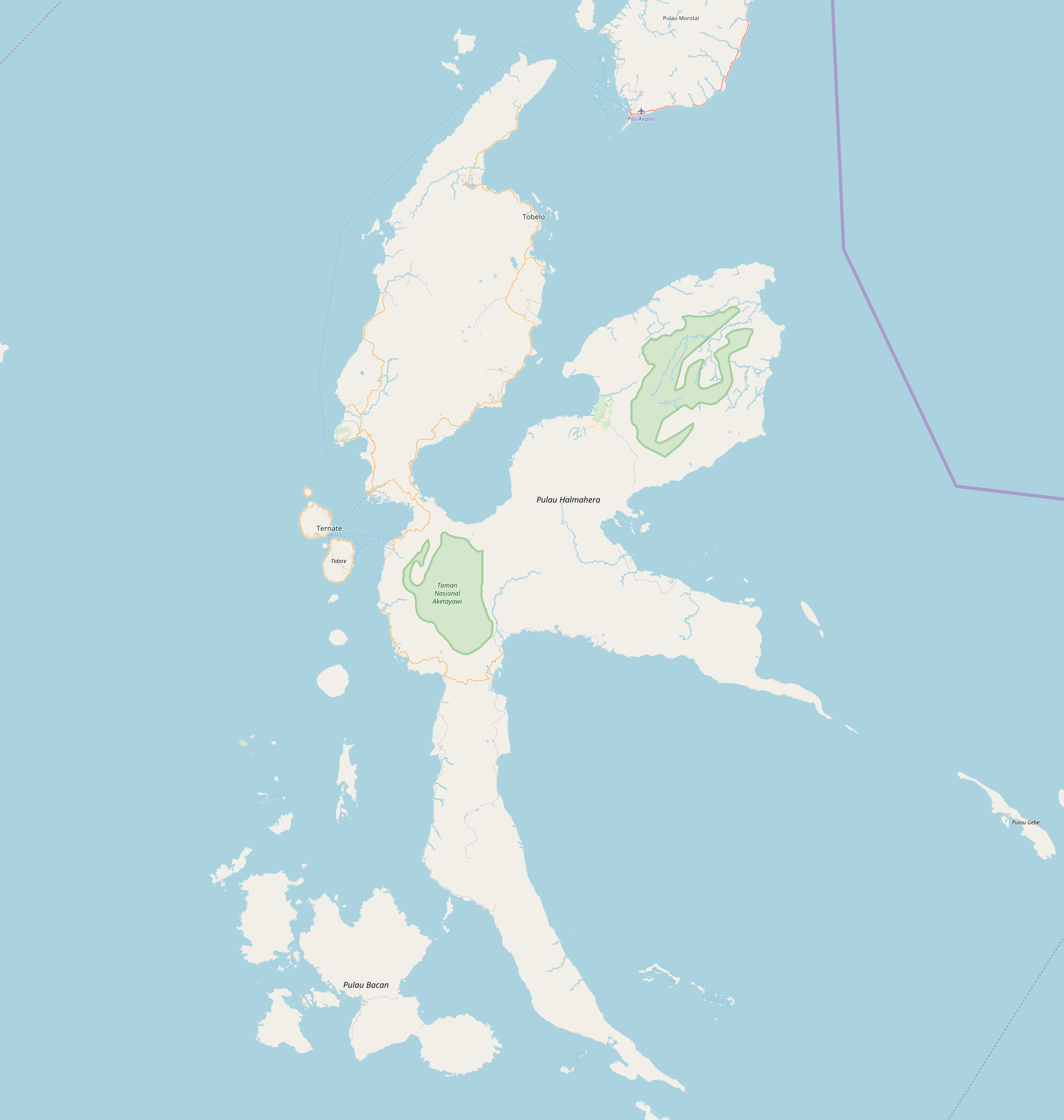
- Location in Halmahera and Indonesia Sofifi (Indonesia)
- Coordinates: 0°43′28″N 127°34′50″E
- Country: Indonesia
- Province: North Maluku
- City/regency: Tidore Islands City and parts of West Halmahera Regency

Area
  - Total: 35 km^{2} (14 sq mi)
- Elevation: 15 m (49 ft)

Population (2020 Census)
  - Total: 27,591
  - Density: 790/km^{2} (2,000/sq mi)
- Time zone: UTC+9 (Indonesia Eastern Time)
- Postcodes: 97827
- Area code: (+62) 921

Sofifi is a town on the west coast of the Indonesian island of Halmahera, and since 2010 has been the capital of the province of North Maluku. It straddles between the North Oba (Oba Utara) District of the city of Tidore Islands as well parts of the South Jailolo (Jailolo Selatan) District of the West Halmahera Regency. At the 2020 Census, the town had a population of 2,498, while North Oba District had a population of 19,552. Previously, Ternate had been the province's capital.

Sofifi is a spread-out place connected by wide roads and interspersed with forlorn-looking government buildings, Sofifi serves travellers mainly as a junction on the route to Tobelo.

== Climate ==
Sofifi has a tropical rainforest climate (Köppen Af) with heavy rainfall year-round.

Climate data for Sofifi
Month	Jan	Feb	Mar	Apr	May	Jun	Jul	Aug	Sep	Oct	Nov	Dec	Year
Mean daily maximum °C (°F)	29.8 (85.6)	29.8 (85.6)	29.8 (85.6)	30.6 (87.1)	30.3 (86.5)	30.0 (86.0)	29.6 (85.3)	30.3 (86.5)	30.3 (86.5)	30.6 (87.1)	30.9 (87.6)	29.6 (85.3)	30.1 (86.2)
Daily mean °C (°F)	26.2 (79.2)	26.2 (79.2)	26.2 (79.2)	26.8 (80.2)	26.7 (80.1)	26.4 (79.5)	26.1 (79.0)	26.6 (79.9)	26.3 (79.3)	26.5 (79.7)	27.0 (80.6)	26.0 (78.8)	26.4 (79.6)
Mean daily minimum °C (°F)	22.7 (72.9)	22.7 (72.9)	22.7 (72.9)	23.1 (73.6)	23.1 (73.6)	22.9 (73.2)	22.7 (72.9)	23.0 (73.4)	22.4 (72.3)	22.5 (72.5)	23.2 (73.8)	22.5 (72.5)	22.8 (73.0)
Average rainfall mm (inches)	201 (7.9)	173 (6.8)	179 (7.0)	197 (7.8)	207 (8.1)	203 (8.0)	204 (8.0)	171 (6.7)	129 (5.1)	127 (5.0)	161 (6.3)	192 (7.6)	2,144 (84.3)
