= Gebe language =

Austronesian language spoken in North Maluku, Indonesia

Gebe
- Minyaifuin
- Native to: Indonesia
- Native speakers: (2,700 cited 2000)
- Language family: Austronesian: Malayo-Polynesian; Central–Eastern Malayo-Polynesian; Eastern Malayo-Polynesian; South Halmahera–West New Guinea; Raja Ampat–South Halmahera; South Halmahera; Gebe
- Dialects: Gag; Nuclear Gebe; Umera; Umiyal; Sanafkacepo

Language codes
- ISO 639-3: gei
- Glottolog: gebe1237
- ELP: Gebe

Gebe, or Minyaifuin, is an Austronesian language of eastern Indonesia, spoken on the Gebe, Yu, and Gag islands between Halmahera and Waigeo.

== Dialects ==
The Gebe language is divided into five dialects spoken on three separate islands, as follows:

- The Gag dialect is spoken on Gag Island, the dialect is almost similar to the Umera dialect because the population migrated from there.
- The Nuclear Gebe dialect is the most widely used dialect, spoken in the settlement centers on Gebe Island, including the villages of Elfanun, Kacepi, Kapaleo, Sanafi, and Yam.
- The Umera dialect is spoken in Umera village, located in the southeastern part of Gebe Island.
- The Umiyal dialect is spoken in Umiyal, the only village on Yu Island.
- The Sanafkacepo dialect is spoken in Sanafkacepo village on the east coast of Gebe Island.

== Phonology ==
Consonants
		Labial	Alveolar	Palatal	Velar	Glottal
Nasal		m	n	ɲ	ŋ	
Plosive/ Affricate	voiceless	p	t	tʃ	k	(ʔ)
Plosive/ Affricate	voiced	b	d		ɡ	
Fricative		f	s			h
Rhotic			r			
Lateral			l			
Approximant		w		j		

[ʔ] only appears when within the sequence of vowels in syllable-final positions.

Voiced sounds /b, d/ may also be articulated by speakers as implosive sounds [ɓ, ɗ] when in word-initial or intervocalic positions.

Vowels
	Front	Central	Back
Close	i		u
Close-mid	e		o
Open-mid	ɛ		ɔ
Open		a	ɑ
