= Riz Rural District =

Rural district in Bushehr province, Iran

Riz Rural District Persian: دهستان ريز
- Rural District
- Location within Iran
- Coordinates: 28°05′N 52°03′E
- Country: Iran
- Province: Bushehr
- County: Jam
- District: Riz
- Established: 1986
- Capital: Riz

Population (2016)
  - Total: 1,594
- Time zone: UTC+3:30 (IRST)

Riz Rural District (Persian: دهستان ریز) is in Riz District of Jam County, Bushehr province, Iran. It is administered from the city of Riz.

== Demographics ==
=== Population ===
At the time of the 2006 National Census, the rural district's population was 1,422 in 334 households. There were 1,562 inhabitants in 409 households at the following census of 2011. The 2016 census measured the population of the rural district as 1,594 in 452 households. The most populous of its five villages was Poshtu, with 985 people.

=== Other villages in the rural district ===
- Hoseynabad
- Qaleh Kohneh
