= Maba language (Indonesia) =

Austronesian language spoken in North Maluku, Indonesia

Maba
- Bicoli
- Native to: Indonesia
- Region: North Maluku province
- Native speakers: (6,600 cited 2000)
- Language family: Austronesian: Malayo-Polynesian; Central–Eastern Malayo-Polynesian; Eastern Malayo-Polynesian; South Halmahera–West New Guinea; Raja Ampat–South Halmahera; South Halmahera; Central–Eastern; Gamrange; Maba

Language codes
- ISO 639-3: mqa
- Glottolog: maba1278

Maba is a South Halmahera language of southern Halmahera, Indonesia.
