= Patna, Rajasthan =

Patna
- Interactive map of Patna
- Coordinates: 24.806345°N 76.64424°E
- Country: India
- State: Rajasthan
- District: Baran

Population (2011)
  - Total: 2,133

Languages
  - Official: Hindi
- Time zone: UTC+5:30 (IST)
- ISO 3166 code: RJ-IN

Patna is a large village located in Atru Tehsil of Baran district, Rajasthan, India. The village has a population of 2133, of which 1139 are men while 994 are women, according to the Indian Census of 2011.

== Sex ratio ==
Of the total population in Patna village, 12.14% are children aged 0–6. The average sex ratio in the village is 873, which is lower than the Rajasthan state average of 928. Additionally, the child sex ratio for Patna is 877, which is lower than the Rajasthan average of 888.

== Literacy ==
Patna village has a higher literacy rate that the state average of Rajasthan. As of 2011, the literacy rate in the village was 71.13%, with male literacy at 84.32% and female literacy at 56.01%.
