= Sawai language =

Austronesian language spoken in North Maluku, Indonesia

Sawai
- Weda
- Native to: Indonesia
- Region: North Maluku province
- Native speakers: (12,000 cited 2000)
- Language family: Austronesian: Malayo-Polynesian; Central–Eastern Malayo-Polynesian; Eastern Malayo-Polynesian; South Halmahera–West New Guinea; Raja Ampat–South Halmahera; South Halmahera; Central–Eastern; Gamrange; Sawai
- Dialects: Weda; Sawai; Kobe; Faya-Mafa; Messa-Dote

Language codes
- ISO 639-3: szw
- Glottolog: sawa1247

The Sawai language (also Weda) is a South Halmahera language of the Austronesian language family spoken in the Weda, Weda Selatan and Gane Timor districts of southern Halmahera, in North Maluku Province of Indonesia. There are approximately 12,000 speakers.

== Sounds ==
Below is a description of the Kobe dialect of Sawai spoken in the villages of Lelilef Woyebulan and Kobe Peplis, as well as from Whistler (1995).

=== Consonants ===
Sawai has 15 consonants:

	Labial	Alveolar	Palatal	Velar
Stop	p b	t d		k ɡ
Fricative	f	s		
Nasal	m	n		ŋ
Semivowel	w		j	
Liquid		l ɾ		

=== Vowels ===
Sawai has eight vowels:

	Front	Central	Back
High	i		u
High-Mid	e	ə	o
Low-Mid	ɛ		ɔ
Low		a	

=== Syllable ===
Sawai has the following syllable structure:

(C)(C)V(C)

Examples:

word	gloss	syllable type
/i/	's/he/it'	V
/in/	'fish'	VC
/wo/	'alcoholic drink'	CV
/npo/	's/he/it gives'	CCV
/kot/	'magic statue'	CVC
/nfan/	's/he/it goes'	CCVC

== Bibliography ==
- Burquest, Donald A.; & Laidig, Wyn D. (Eds.). (1992). Phonological studies in four languages of Maluku. The Summer Institute of Linguistics and the University of Texas at Arlington publications in linguistics (No. 108). Dallas: The Summer Institute of Linguistics, The University of Texas at Arlington, and Pattimura University. ISBN 0-88312-803-9.
- Whistler, Ronald. (1992). Phonology of Sawai. In D. A. Burquest & W. D. Laidig (Eds.), Phonological studies in four languages of Maluku (pp. 7–32). Dallas: The Summer Institute of Linguistics, The University of Texas at Arlington, and Pattimura University.
- Whistler, Ronald; & Whistler, Jacqui. (1995). Sawai: Introduction and wordlist. In D. T. Tryon (Ed.), Comparative Austronesian dictionary: An introduction to Austronesian studies (part 1: fascicle 1, pp. 659–65). Trends in linguistics, Documentation (No. 10). Berlin: Mouton de Gruyter.
