= Poshtu, Bushehr =

Village in Bushehr province, Iran

Poshtu Persian: پشتو
- Village
- Location within Iran
- Coordinates: 28°03′16″N 52°04′24″E
- Country: Iran
- Province: Bushehr
- County: Jam
- District: Riz
- Rural District: Riz

Population (2016)
  - Total: 985
- Time zone: UTC+3:30 (IRST)

Poshtu (Persian: پشتو) (Note: Also romanized as Pashtoo and Poshtū; also known as Posthū and Pushtu) is a village in Riz Rural District of Riz District in Jam County, Bushehr province, Iran.

== Demographics ==
=== Population ===
At the time of the 2006 National Census, the village's population was 798 in 194 households. The following census in 2011 counted 939 people in 256 households. The 2016 census measured the population of the village as 985 people in 270 households. It was the most populous village in its rural district.
