= Patna (ship) =

The following ships have been named Patna after Patna:

- Patna (1778 ship) was a sloop launched in 1778 at Java that served as a pilot boat for the British East India Company's Bengal Pilot Service. She was sold in 1796.
- Patna (1842 ship) was a barque launched in 1842 that served the Brocklebank Line until 1868 when the line sold her to R & H. Jefferson, Whitehaven.
- Patna (1871) was a screw steamer that William Denny & Bros built on the Clyde in 1871 to carry passengers and cargo.
- HMIS Patna (T255) was a Basset-class trawler built on the Hooghly River and launched on 1 September 1942 for the Royal Indian Marine. On 2 May 1945 she was under the command of Lieutenant A.C. Dalziel, RINR, at Rangoon, participating in Operation Dracula. She was sold in 1946.

== Fictional ships ==
- SS Patna is the name of the fictional ship in the novel Lord Jim by Joseph Conrad, originally published in Blackwood's Magazine from October 1899 to November 1900. Though never confirmed by the author, the ship is based on the real ship SS Jeddah. The fictional Patna used steam and sail in combination.
