= Buli language (Indonesia) =

Austronesian language spoken in North Maluku, Indonesia

Buli
- Native to: Indonesia
- Region: North Maluku
- Native speakers: (2,500 cited 2000)
- Language family: Austronesian: Malayo-Polynesian; Central–Eastern Malayo-Polynesian; Eastern Malayo-Polynesian; South Halmahera–West New Guinea; Raja Ampat–South Halmahera; South Halmahera; Central–Eastern; Buli
- Dialects: Buli; Wayamli

Language codes
- ISO 639-3: bzq
- Glottolog: buli1255

Buli is an Austronesian language of southern Halmahera, Indonesia.
