= Patan, Mawal =

Village in Maharashtra

Patan
- Village
- Location in Maharashtra, India Patan (India)
- Coordinates: 18.7415538°N 73.4867871°E
- Country: India
- State: Maharashtra
- District: Pune
- Tehsil: Mawal

Government
  - Type: Panchayati Raj
  - Body: Gram panchayat

Area
  - Total: 395.95 ha (978.4 acres)

Population (2011)
  - Total: 1,727
  - Density: 436.2/km^{2} (1,130/sq mi)
- Sex ratio 902 / 825 ♂/♀

Languages
  - Official: Marathi
  - Other spoken: Hindi
- Time zone: UTC+5:30 (IST)
- Pin code: 410405
- Telephone code: 02114
- ISO 3166 code: IN-MH
- Vehicle registration: MH-14
- Website: pune.nic.in

Patan is a village and gram panchayat in India, situated in Mawal taluka of Pune district in the state of Maharashtra. It encompasses an area of 395.95 ha (978 acres).

== Administration ==
The village is administrated by a sarpanch, an elected representative who leads a gram panchayat. At the time of the 2011 Census of India, the village was the headquarters for the eponymous gram panchayat, which also governed the village of Boraj.

== Demographics ==
At the 2011 census, the village comprised 345 households. The population of 1727 was split between 902 males and 825 females.

== Air travel connectivity ==
The closest airport to the village is Pune Airport.

== See also ==
- List of villages in Mawal taluka
