= Weda Bay Industrial Park =

Nickel mining site in Indonesia

Coordinates: 0.47832°N 127.98363°E

The Weda Bay Industrial Park is a nickel mining and industrial park complex in Central Halmahera Regency, North Maluku, Indonesia. The Weda Bay Mine is now among the largest nickel mines in the world.

== History ==
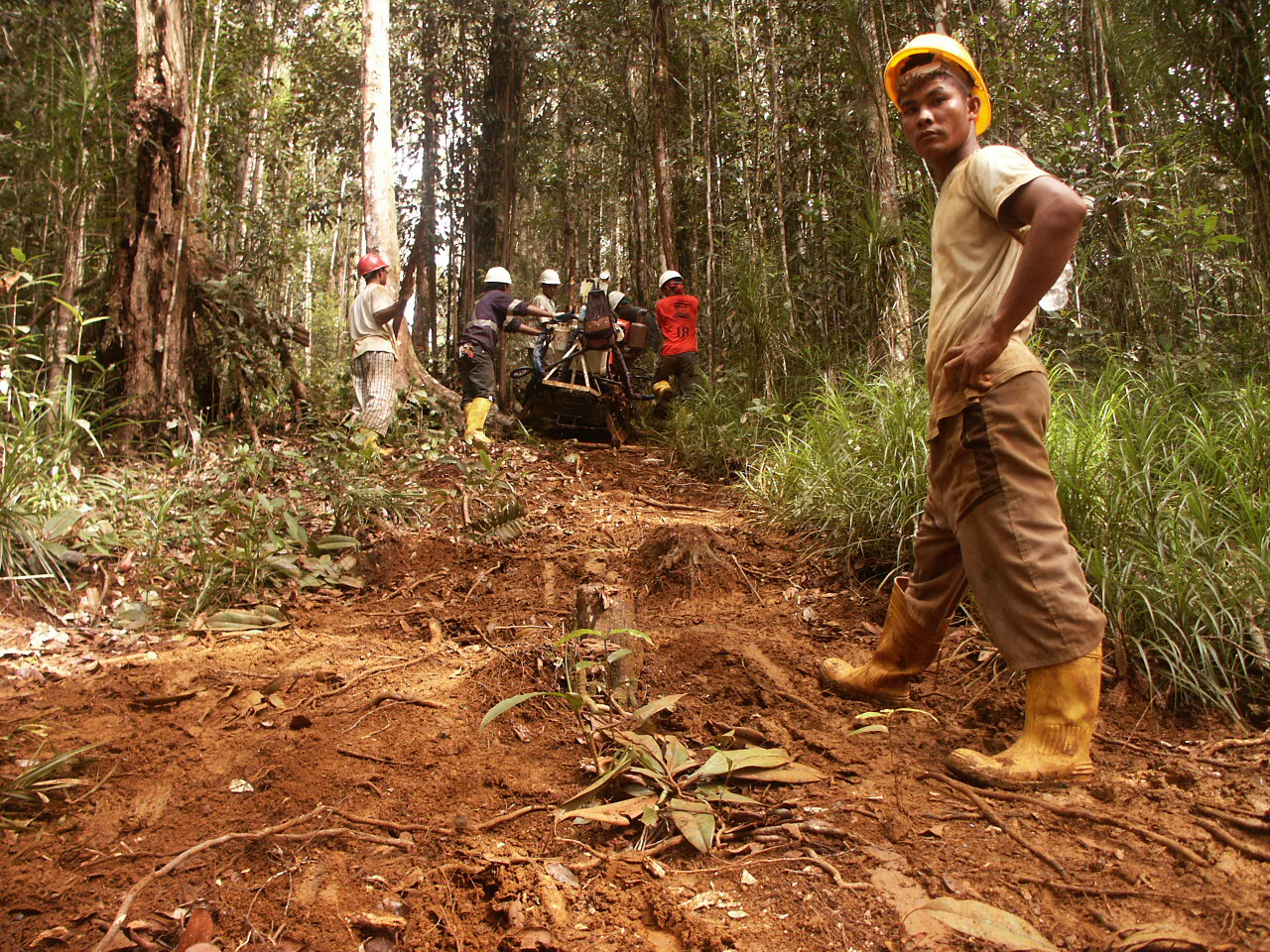
Nickel exploration activities in Weda Bay, 2005

Nickel deposits were discovered in the Weda Bay area in Central Halmahera in 1996, and a joint venture between Canada-based Weda Bay Minerals and Antam (10%) was established in 1997.

French mining group Eramet acquired the Canadian stake in 2006, and planned to develop the site, but due to low mineral prices the project was put on hold in 2013.

In 2017, China's Tsingshan Group signed an agreement, giving it a 57% stake in Weda Bay Minerals, and giving Tsingshan the responsibility to develop mineral processing while Eramet retained its mining operations. Construction of the industrial park began in April 2018, with mining operations commencing in October 2019 and metallurgical production in April 2020.

As of 2020, four nickel ferroalloy production lines are active in the industrial park, with undergoing development of a cobalt-nickel refining complex. A nickel sulphate plant is also slated for construction in the park.

Eramet signed an agreement with German chemicals company BASF in 2020, to develop a nickel-cobalt refinery. This agreement was terminated by BASF in June 2024.

== Workforce ==
The industrial park employed around 11,000 people as of 2020. In early 2022, the park reported that this figure has increased to 28,000 Indonesian and 1,800 foreign workers, rising further to 47,000 total workers by 2024.

== Mine ==
The Weda Mine was opened in October 2019 and is now the largest nickel mine in the world, with production from October through December of 2019 of half a million tonnes of nickel ore. It reported sales in 2021 of over 21 Mwt (million wet tonnes) from its mine.

The ore is disseminated nickel as fine-grained manganese-nickel silicates in a laterite soil. The nickel is found as garnierite as is associated with the iron minerals limonite, magnitite and goethite, as well as various clay minerals. The complex formed from the lateritic weathering of ultramafic rocks: serpentinite, dunite, and peridotite.

The mine is a series of open pits, including the sites at Kao Rahai, Sake River, Sake West, Nuspera and Uni Uni.
