= M. A. Pathan =

Indian businessman (born 1942)

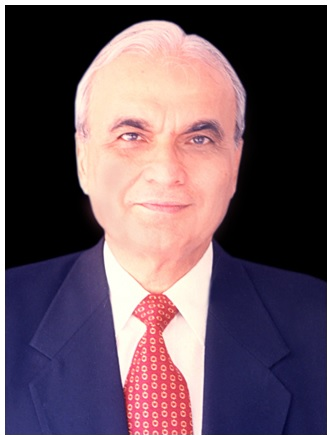
- Born: March 9, 1942 (age 84); British Raj
- Education: B.A. (Hons.)
- Spouse: Shobha Pathan

M. A. Pathan (born 9 March 1942) is an Indian businessman who served as the chairman of Indian Oil Corporation Ltd. from 1997 to 2002. He later served as Chairman of the Petroleum Federation of India (PetroFed) 2002 to 2003.

== Career ==
Pathan joined Indian Oil in the year 1962 and held several leadership positions, including chairman of Indian Oil Corporation Ltd. He was also Group Resident Director, Delhi with TATAs from November 2002 - to September 2007).

He was also a strategic advisor in IOT Infrastructure & Energy Services Ltd. from September 2002 to March 2015.

== Awards ==
- New Millennium Top CEO Award for Excellence
- Dadabhai Naoroji New Millennium Award
- National Citizen's Award (2001)
- Best Industrial Manager Award (2000–2001)
- Mother Teresa Award – For Corporation Citizen (2001)
- CEPM – PMA Honorary Fellowship (2002)
- Petrotech Lifetime Achievement Award in Oil & Gas Sector (2012)
- Hall of Fame, Leadership & Excellence Award in Oil & Gas (2014)
- Global Excellence Award in Petroleum Sector (2015)
- Life Time Achievement Award in Oil & Gas (Urja Sangam 2015)
- Meritorious Energy Service Award for his exemplary services to Indian Energy Sector by the India Energy Forum (2017)
