= Patna railway station =

Patna railway station may refer to:

- Patna Junction railway station, in Patna, Bihar, India
- Patna Sahib railway station or Patna City, in Patna Saheb, Bihar, India
- Patna railway station (Scotland), in Patna, Scotland
