= Poshtu, Hormozgan =

Poshtu پشتو
- Village
- Location within Iran
- Coordinates: 27°47′41″N 57°11′57″E
- Country: Iran
- Province: Hormozgan
- County: Rudan
- Bakhsh: Rudkhaneh
- Rural District: Mosaferabad

Population (2006)
  - Total: 139
- Time zone: UTC+3:30 (IRST)
  - Summer (DST): UTC+4:30 (IRDT)

Poshtu (PashtoPersian: پښتو, also Romanized as Poshtū; also known as Poshtooh and Poshtū’īyeh) is a village in Mosaferabad Rural District, Rudkhaneh District, Rudan County, Hormozgan Province, Iran. At the 2006 census, its population was 139, in 28 families.
