= Gebe =

Island in Indonesia

- Location near Raja Ampat Islands

Geography
- Coordinates: 0°4′33.20″S 129°26′54.67″E
- Area: 223.86 km^{2} (86.43 sq mi)

Administration
- Indonesia
- Province: North Maluku

Gebe is an island in the Maluku Islands, Indonesia, situated between Raja Ampat and Halmahera. Administratively it is part of Central Halmahera Regency, North Maluku Province, but is physically separated from the rest of the regency by the Jailolo Strait (Selat Jailolo).

The island is the main part of a small island group which also includes the islands of Fau, Yu, Uta, and Sain. Together the group forms the Gebe Island District (Kecamatan Pulau Gebe), which covers a land area of 223.86 km^{2}, and had a population of 6,181 as at mid 2024. There are eight villages (desa) including Elfanun, Kacepi, Kapaleo, Sanafi, Sanafkacepo, Umera, and Yam on Gebe Island and Umiyal (formerly Omnial) on Yu Island.

Gebe is part of the Halmahera rainforests ecoregion. The Gebe cuscus (Phalanger alexandrae), an arboreal marsupial, is endemic to the island.

The centre of island lies slightly south of the equator, but ~20% of Gebe island is in the Northern Hemisphere

The Gebe language, an Austronesian language, is spoken in this island.
