= Patan, Udaipur =

Patan is a small village in Salumbar tehsil, Udaipur district, Rajasthan, India.
