= Patani language =

Austronesian language spoken in North Maluku, Indonesia

Patani
- Native to: Indonesia
- Region: North Maluku
- Native speakers: (10,600 cited 2000)
- Language family: Austronesian: Malayo-Polynesian; Central–Eastern Malayo-Polynesian; Eastern Malayo-Polynesian; South Halmahera–West New Guinea; Raja Ampat–South Halmahera; South Halmahera; Central–Eastern; Gamrange; Patani

Language codes
- ISO 639-3: ptn
- Glottolog: pata1260

Patani is an Austronesian language of southern Halmahera, Indonesia.
