= Halmahera =

Island of the Maluku Islands in Indonesia

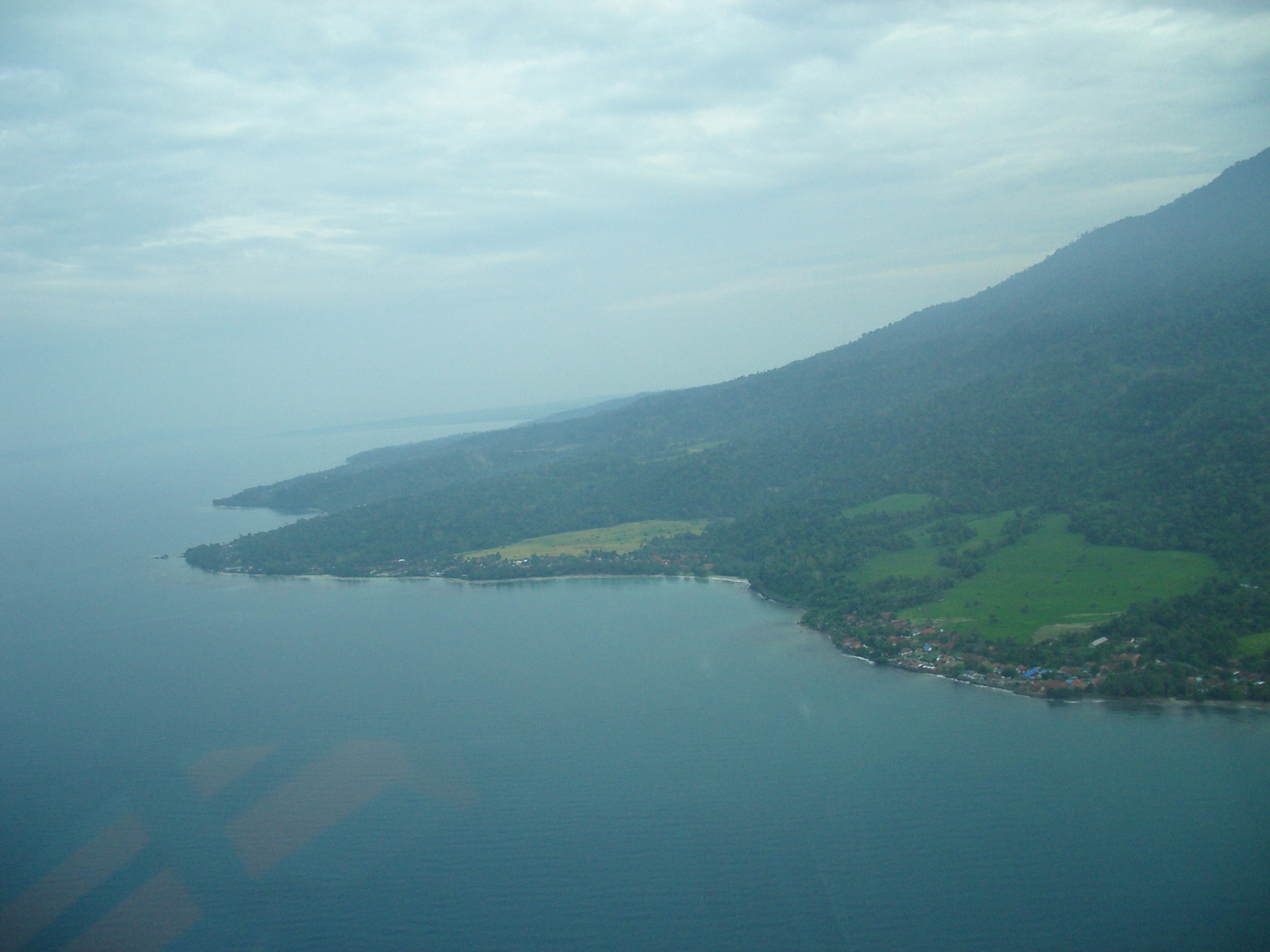
- Coastline of Halmahera

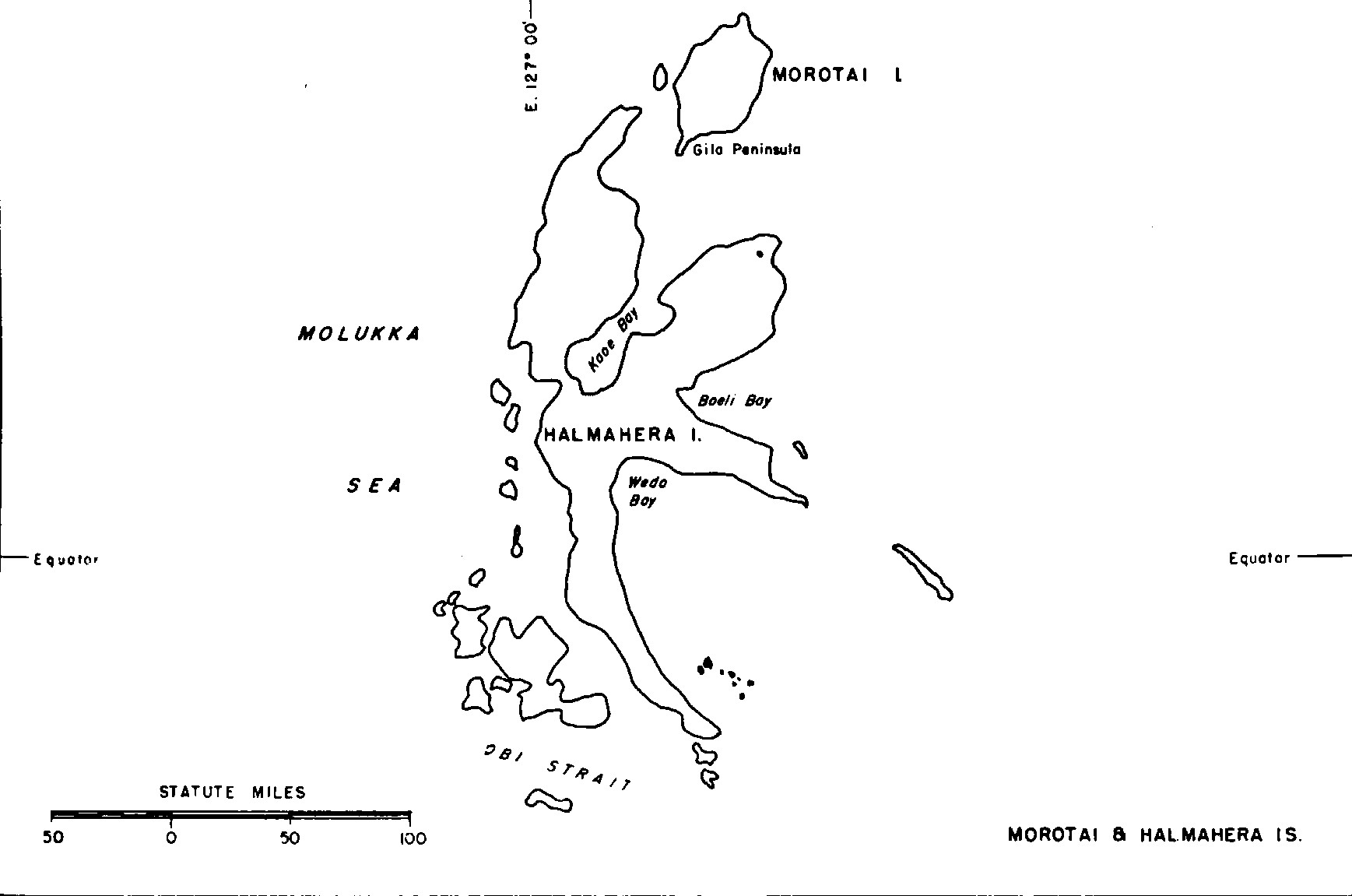
- Small scale map of the island

- Location within North Maluku Location within Maluku and Western New Guinea Location within Indonesia

Geography
- Location: South East Asia
- Coordinates: 0.65°N 127.90°E
- Archipelago: Maluku Islands
- Area: 17,780 km^{2} (6,860 sq mi)
- Area rank: 51st
- Highest elevation: 1,560 m (5120 ft)
- Highest point: Mount Gamkonora

Administration
- Indonesia
- Province: North Maluku
- Largest settlement: Tobelo

Demographics
- Population: 667,161 (2024)
- Pop. density: 37.5/km^{2} (97.1/sq mi)
- Ethnic groups: Tobelo, Bugis, Togutil, Ibu, Gamkonora, Galela, Sahu, Waioli, Modole, Pagu, Kao, Sawai, Gane, Buli, Maba, Loloda, Tabaru, and Patani. Significant migrant groups include Sangir, Ternate, Tidore, Makian, and Javanese.

Halmahera, formerly known as Jilolo, Gilolo, or Jailolo, is the largest island in the Maluku Islands. It is part of the North Maluku province of Indonesia, and Sofifi, the capital of the province, is located on the west coast of the island.

Halmahera has a land area of 17,780 km^{2} (6,860 sq mi). It is the 7th largest island of Indonesia. It had a population of 162,728 in 1995; by 2010, it had increased to 449,938 for the island itself (excluding the tip which is considered part of the Joronga Islands, but including Gebe and Ju islands) and 667,161 for the island group (including all of South Halmahera and Tidore, but not Ternate). Approximately half of the island's inhabitants are Muslim and half are Christian.

== History ==
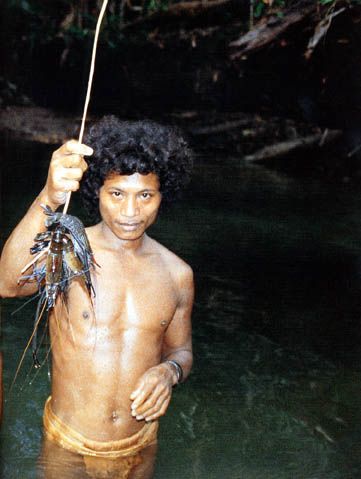
A Togutil man of interior island of Halmahera.

Sparsely populated Halmahera's fortunes have long been closely tied to those of the smaller islands of Ternate and Tidore, both off its west coast. This island was the site of Sultanate of Jailolo, one of the four kingdoms of Maluku (Maloko Kië Raha, of Ternate, Tidore, Bacan, and Jailolo) in the era before Dutch East India Company colonized the entire archipelago. The north of the island is also the base of Loloda Kingdom, one of the earlier 13th century Moluccan kingdoms, but not recognized as one of the prominent four.

During World War II, Halmahera was the site of a Japanese naval base at Kao Bay.

In 1999 and 2000, Halmahera was the site of violence that began as a purely ethnic dispute between residents of (mainly Christian) Kao and (entirely Muslim) Malifut districts and then took on a religious nature as it spread through much of the North Moluccas, called the Maluku sectarian conflict. Thousands of people on Halmahera were killed in the fighting between religious militias. In June 2000, about five hundred people were killed when a ferry carrying refugees from the fighting on Halmahera sank off the northeast tip of Sulawesi island. Conspiracy theories about this event abound. A memorial to this tragedy can be found in Duma village in North Halmahera Regency.

Today, much transportation to the rest of Indonesia is through connections on the provincial capital, Ternate island although Tobelo, the largest town on Halmahera, also has direct ferry and cargo sea links to Surabaya and Manado.

Particularly, since the inauguration of the first ever directly elected bupati (regent head), Tobelo is undergoing rapid development and is aiming at rivaling Ternate's historical dominance. As it is surrounded by flat land, Tobelo has the potential for expansion. Ternate is limited by its size, being a small island which can be driven around in forty-five minutes. Also, in 2010, the provincial government moved the provincial capital from Ternate City to Sofifi, a small village on the Halmahera coast opposite Tidore island.

North Maluku Province consists of eight regencies and two municipalities (cities); five of the regencies and one municipality include a part of Halmahera island. The regencies are North Halmahera, West Halmahera, East Halmahera, Central Halmahera, South Halmahera, Morotai, Sula Islands and Taliabu, while the municipalities are Ternate and Tidore Islands. Only Ternate Municipality, and Morotai, the Sula Islands and Taliabu regencies do not include any part of Halmahera.

The coastal area of Halmahera is inhabited by the Tobelo people (or the O'Hoberera Manyawa (literally "people that live outside of the forest")), while a small semi-nomadic related population lives on the inner parts of Halmahera, the Togutil people (or the O'Hongana Manyawa (literally "people that live inside of the forest")) with an estimated 1,500–3,000 people (according to studies of ethnologists since 2001). Somewhere between 300 and 500 people live in isolation in the forest in the Aketajawe-Lolobata National Park where they obtain their means of subsistence. Uncontacted members are being threatened by a massive Indonesian mining project to produce nickel for electric car batteries.

== Geology ==
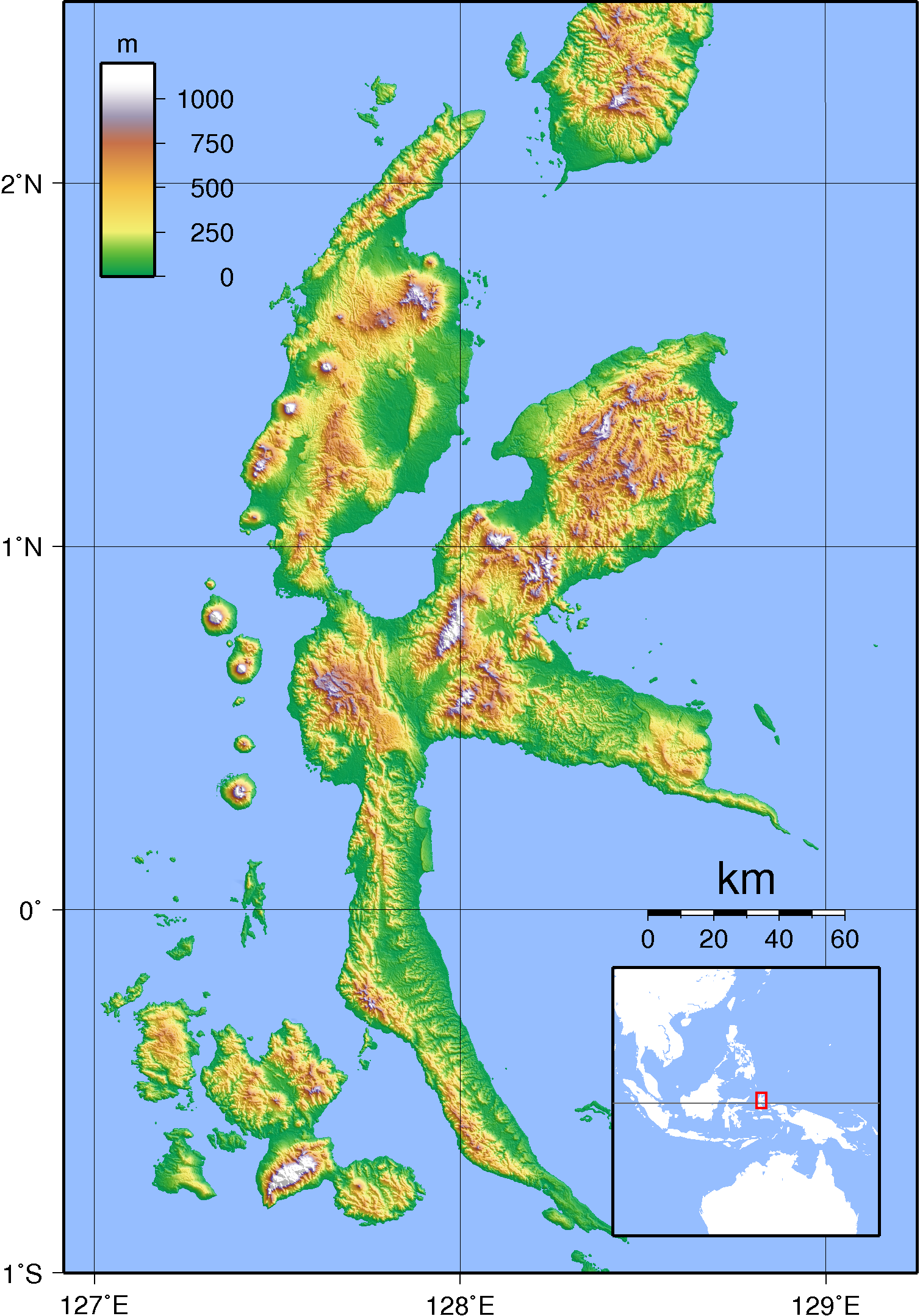
Topography of Halmahera

The volcanic island lies on an island arc that includes the Raja Ampat Islands, all uplifted by the northward migration of the continent of Australia and subduction of the Pacific Plate. Dukono is an active volcano at the north end of the island. Mount Ibu is an active volcano on the island's northwest coast. Ultramafic rocks and ophiolites form the bedrock over large areas of the eastern peninsula.

== Ecology ==
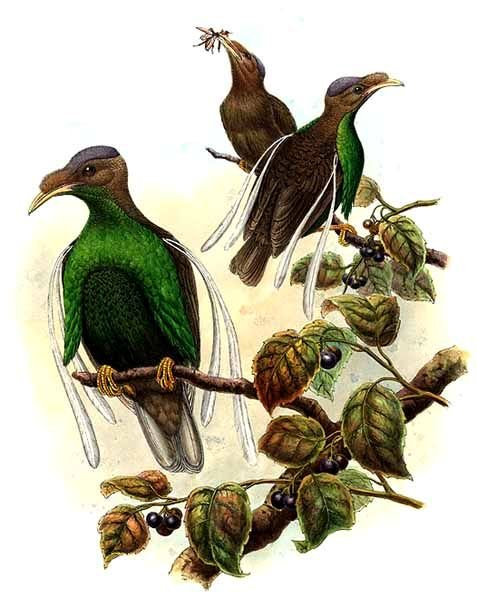
Semioptera wallacii by Richard Bowdler Sharpe (1847–1909)

The flightless invisible rail is endemic to the island. The recently discovered palm tree Jailoloa halmaherensis is also endemic to Halmahera.

The naturalist Alfred Russel Wallace visited Halmahera, as described in his 1869 book The Malay Archipelago. He considered the standardwing bird of paradise, Semioptera wallacii, to be his greatest prize. It was in February 1858, on the island of Ternate (or perhaps while on Halmahera itself), between bouts of fever, that Wallace came to the idea of natural selection via the survival of the fittest. Wallace wrote his ideas during the next couple of days, and sent the historical letter to Darwin.

== Mining ==
Halmahera is the site of several mining projects.

PT Weda Bay Nickel operates a nickel and cobalt mining project in North and Central Halmahera Regencies, the Weda Bay Industrial Park. It is one of the world's largest nickel mining operations. The Indonesian government has prohibited the export of unprocessed nickel ore since 2022. As a result, the ore must first be processed on the island before being exported. A total of 11 (with three more in construction) power plants have already been built for this process. The park is likely to get even bigger. Several investors have already been found willing to invest. The increased demand for nickel for batteries is one of the reasons for the growth.

=== Image gallery ===
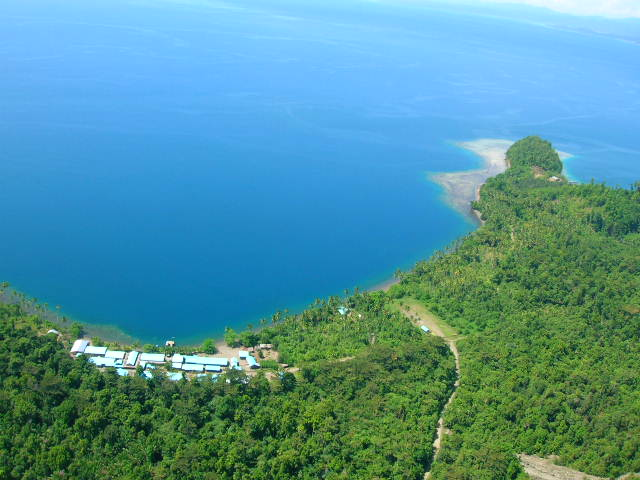
A Weda Bay nickel camp site at Tanjung Ulie cape on Halmahera island

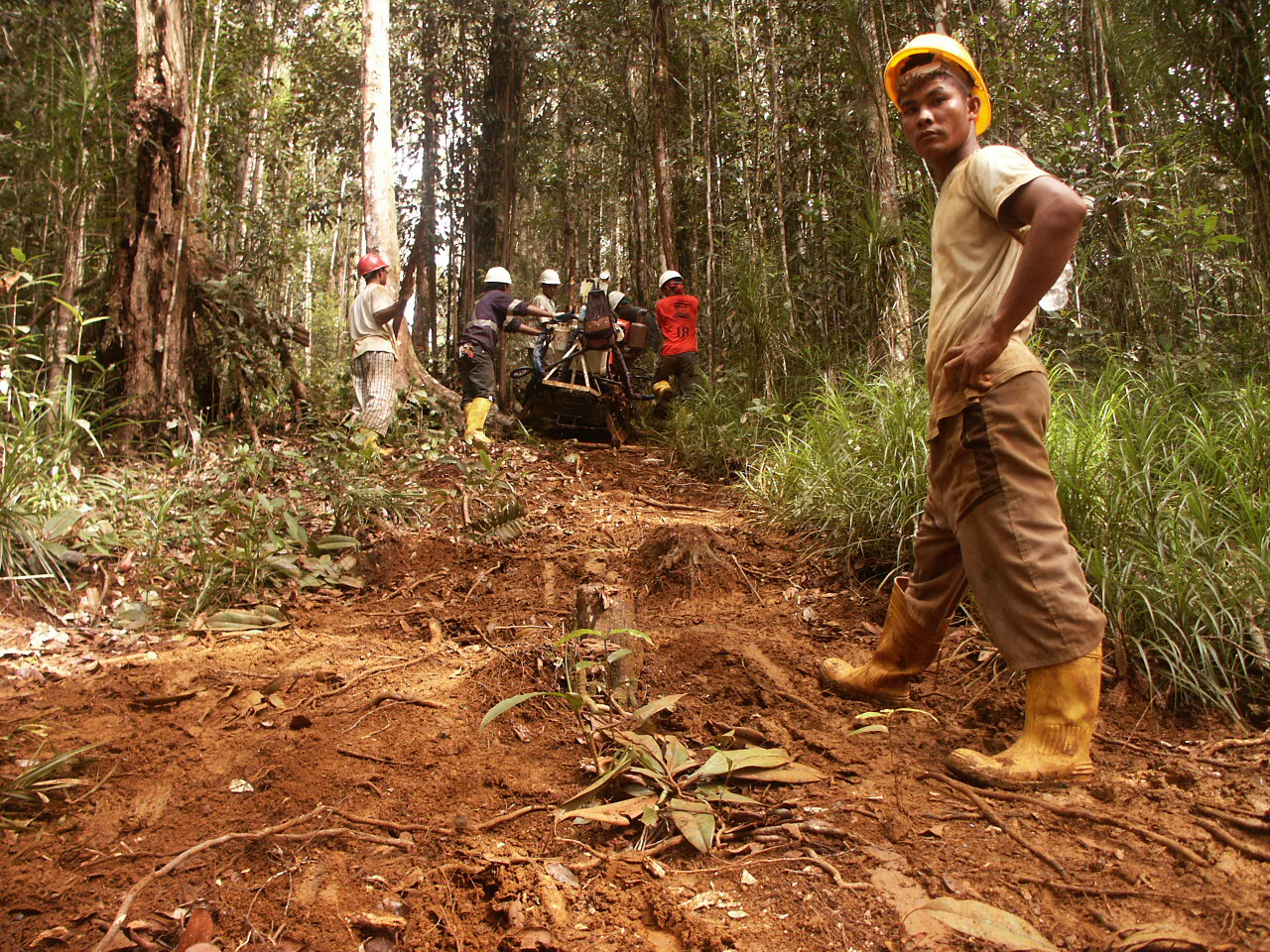
A rig crew looking for minerals

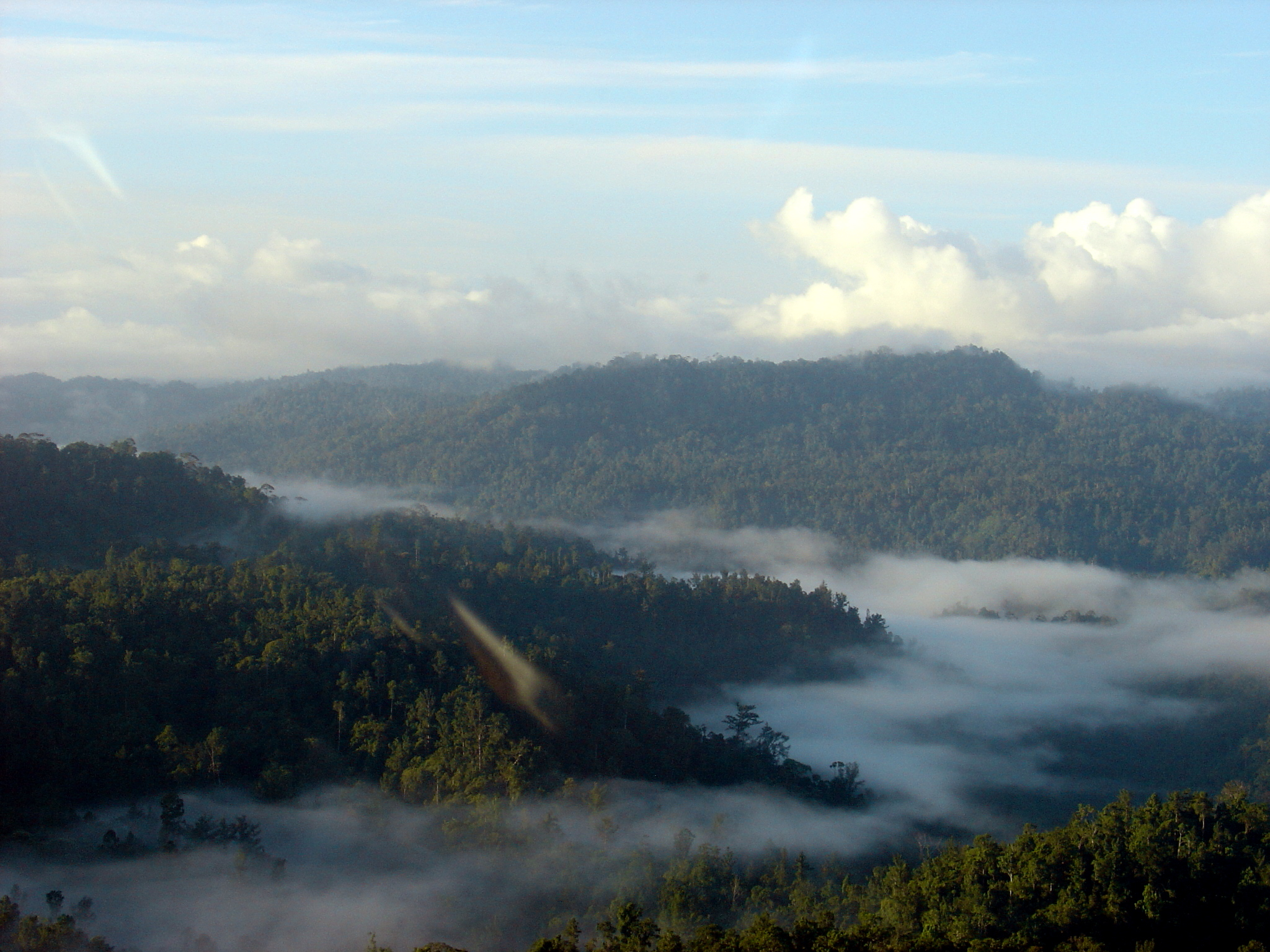
Tropical Rainforest on Halmahera island

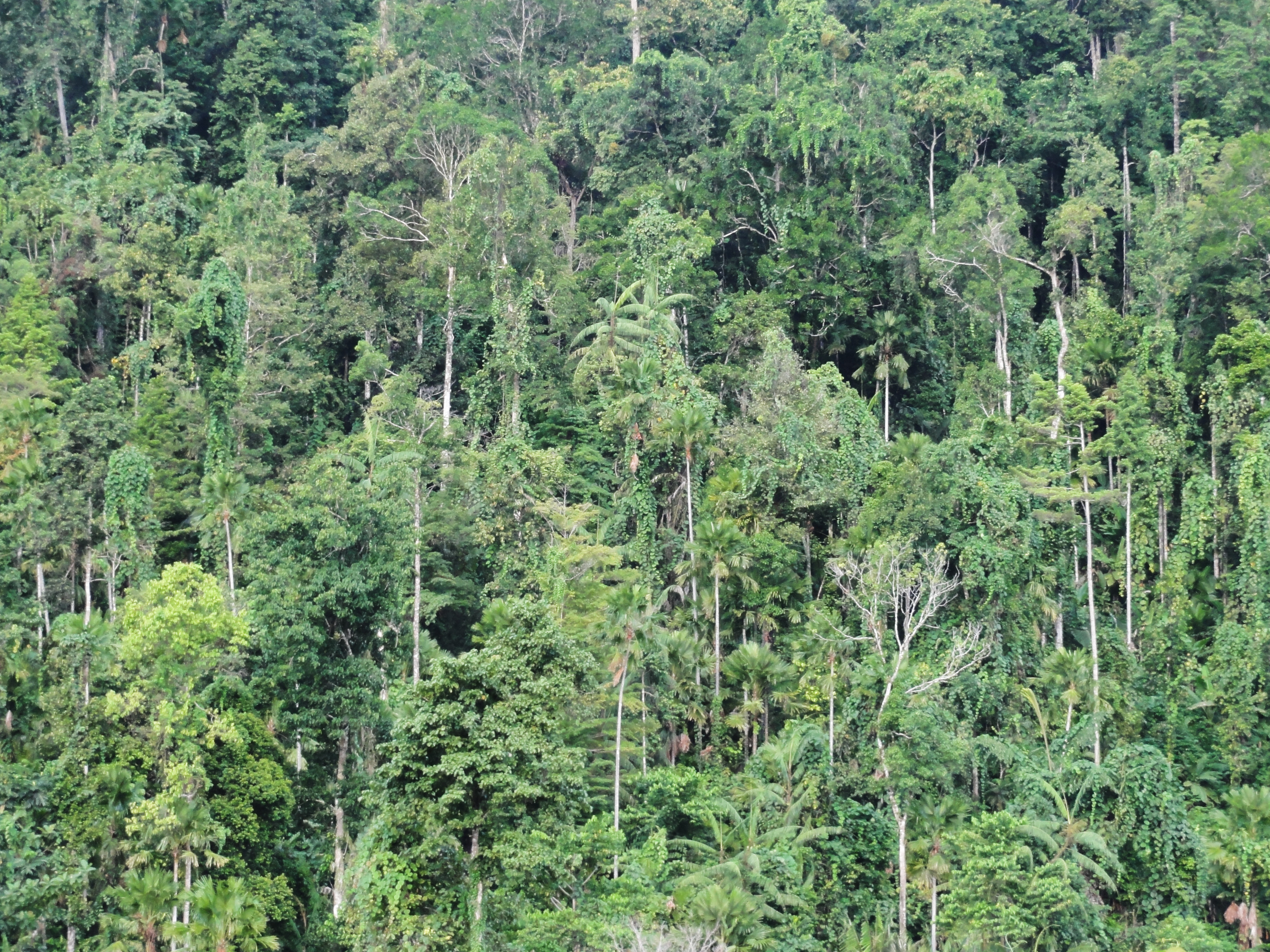
Edge of Aketajawe-Lolobata National park
