= Pathani =

Clan

Paatni/Pathani
- Classification: aristocracy, feudatory, landlord
- Religions: Hinduism • Islam
- Languages: Gangoli variation of • Kumaoni • Garhwali • Hindi
- Populated states: Uttarakhand

The Paatni (Kumaoni: पाटनी) are an ethnic Kumaoni Rajput group of the Attigoan and Kamsyar region of Gangolihat tehsil Pithoragarh district of the Kumaon Himalayas of the Indian state of Uttarakhand.

Paatni people are members of a Chandravanshi Kshatriya clan that migrated from the town of Patan in Rajasthan to their current location in Uttarakhand in the early 16th century. Atkinson described them as the groups holding small principalities in Kumaon at the end of Katyuri rule and the advent of the Chand dynasty in Kumaon. After a brief stint with the Chands, they were awarded a grant of the Patti of Attigaon and Kamsyar i.e. the area from Ganaigangoli to Banspatan.

== Origins ==
The origins of the Paatni Rajput clan is based on traditional folklore prevalent regarding the migration of two Tomara chieftains from the Shekhawati region of Northern Rajasthan, Raimal and Jaimal. Raimal's son Dham Singh is said to have found the Patan branch of Tomara dynasty.

== Raaths ==
They are divided into four Raaths (राठ) corresponding with descendants of the four sons of Dham Singh, the original founder of the clan.

- Padhan Raath; (पधान राठ)
- Dhuri Raath; (धुरि राठ)
- Malla Raath; (मल्ला राठ)
- Paar Raath; (पार राठ)

The word Raath comes from the Sanskrit word ratha, meaning chariot, to symbolize that they are bearers of the founder's legacy.

== Language and culture ==
=== Language ===
They speak the Gangoli dialect of Kumaoni (गंगोली कुमाँऊनी) and Hindi.

=== Religion ===
The majority of the Hindu population worships the Hindu pantheon as well as other local deities such as Aidi Devta, Golu Devta, Kaisinn, Kalbisht, and Nanda Devi, similar to other Kumaonis.

The clan's principal deity is Sem Dev (सैम देव), who is always invoked along with his brother Haru Dev (हरु देव), the divine spirit of Raja Harish of the Chands. The Dhuri Pathanis also worship Ma Haatkalik, Mata of Gangolihaat and Pardevi along with Haru-Sem.

=== Customs ===
As Kumaoni Rajputs, their customs and culture are the same as other Kumaonis. The tradition of Kumaoni Holi, Jhoda and Chanchari songs, and Jaagar the ballads of Gods, Sarau and Choliya the sword dances of Kumaon are a cherished part of their culture.

=== Priests ===
Their customary priests are the Upadhyay clan of Brahmins of Devrari Kuna.

== Festivals ==
Their principal festivals are Harela - a harvest festival celebrated all over Kumaon Vijayadashami (बिजय दशमी) i.e. Dusshera. On this day, the victory of Lord Rama over the demon King Ravana is celebrated; It has special significance for the Rajput community as weapons are also worshipped on this day. Raksha Bandhan or Rakhi or the Shravani Purnima there signifies the day for changing the sacred thread yagnopavit. Aanthoo festival is dedicated to Shiva and his consort Mata Parvati. They also celebrate Nandashthami, which is dedicated to Ma Nanda and Ma Sunanda, the patron deities of Kumaon. They participate in the annual Baurani fair commemorating the adventures of Sem Devta with his brother Haru Dev and their nephew Golu Devta, all of whom are worshipped in the Kumaon region as gods.

== See also ==
- Kumaon division
- Martial race
