= North Maluku =

Province in Maluku Islands, Indonesia

North Maluku Maluku Utara
- Province
- Province of North Maluku; Provinsi Maluku
- Coat of arms
- Nickname(s): Moloku Kie Raha (Ternate) "Four mountain in Maluku"
- Motto: Marimoi Ngone Futuru (Ternate) "United we stand"
- North Maluku in Indonesia
- Interactive map of North Maluku
- Coordinates: 0°47′N 127°22′E
- Country: Indonesia
- Region: Maluku Islands (Eastern Indonesia)
- Capital: Sofifi
- Largest city: Ternate

Government
  - Body: North Maluku Provincial Government
  - Governor: Sherly Tjoanda (Democratic)
  - Vice Governor: Sarbin Sehe
  - Legislature: North Maluku Regional House of Representatives (DPRD)

Area
  - Total: 31,465.98 km^{2} (12,149.08 sq mi)
  - Rank: 27th in Indonesia
- Highest elevation (Buku Sibela): 2,111 m (6,926 ft)

Population (mid 2025 estimate)
  - Total: 1,373,820
  - Density: 43.6605/km^{2} (113.080/sq mi)

Demographics
  - Religion (2019): 74,50% Islam: 25.47% Christianity; 24.97% Protestantism; 0.50% Catholicism; 0.01% Buddhism; 0.01% Hinduism; 0.01% Confucianism
  - Languages: Indonesian (official), Ternate Malay (lingua franca); Galela, Ternate, East Makian, West Makian, Tobelo, Tidore, Yamdena, Sula, Loloda, Tabaru, Sawai, Patani, Maba, Buli, Gane, Kao, and other (regional)
  - Ethnicity: Makians (12.78%); Galelans (9.70%); Ternate (9.40%); Tobelo (8.51%); Tidore (7.76%); Sulas (6.98%); Buton (5.67%); Javanese (4.12%); Sangir (3.04%); Lolodas (2.61%); Tabarus (2.24%); Kaoese (2.15%); Bugis (2,01%); Patanis (1.84%); Bajo (1.73%); Chinese (0.22%); others (21,24%)
- Time zone: UTC+09 (Indonesia Eastern Time)
- ISO 3166 code: ID-MU
- HDI: ▲0.718 (30th) – high
- Website: malutprov.go.id

North Maluku (Indonesian: Maluku Utara, pronounced [maˌluku (ʔ)uˈt̪ara]) is a province of Indonesia. It covers the northern part of the Maluku Islands, bordering the Pacific Ocean to the north, the Halmahera Sea to the east, the Molucca Sea to the west, and the Seram Sea to the south. It shares maritime borders with North Sulawesi and Central Sulawesi to the west; Maluku (province) to the south; Southwest Papua to the east; and Palau to the north. The provincial capital is Sofifi, mostly part of the city of Tidore Islands on the largest island of Halmahera, while the largest city is the island city of Ternate. The population of North Maluku was 1,038,087 in the 2010 census, making it one of the least-populous provinces in Indonesia, but by the 2020 Census the population had risen to 1,282,937, and the official estimate as at mid 2025 was 1,373,820 (comprising 704,000 males and 669,820 females).

North Maluku was originally the centre of the four largest Islamic sultanates in the eastern Indonesian archipelago—Bacan, Jailolo, Tidore and Ternate—known as the Moloku Kië Raha (the Four Mountains of Maluku). Upon Europeans' arrival at the beginning of the 16th century, North Maluku became the site of competition between the Portuguese, Spanish and the Dutch to control trade. In the end, the Dutch emerged victorious, beginning three centuries of Dutch rule in the region. The Japanese invaded the region during World War II, and Ternate actually became the center of the Japanese rule of the Pacific region. Following Indonesian independence, the region became a part of the province of Maluku.

The province of North Maluku was officially established on 12 October 1999, by separation from Maluku. The island city of Ternate served as its de facto capital until 2010, when the provincial government moved to Sofifi on the mainland of Halmahera. The regional economy in North Maluku largely relies on the agricultural sector, fisheries and other types of marine products. The main commodities that support the economic pulse in North Maluku include copra, nutmeg, cloves, fisheries, gold and nickel. North Maluku's agricultural products include rice, corn, roasted sweet potatoes, beans, coconut, potatoes, nutmeg, sago, and eucalyptus.

== Etymology ==
Historically, the term Maluku referred to the four royal centres in North Maluku, namely Ternate, Tidore, Bacan and Jailolo. A type of confederation consisting of the four kingdoms, which most likely emerged in the 14th century, was called Moloku Kie Raha or "Four Mountains of Maluku". Although the four kingdoms subsequently expanded and covered the entire North Maluku region (as now defined) and parts of Sulawesi and New Guinea, the area of expansion was originally not included in the term Maluku. This only referred to the four main clove-producing islands to the west of Halmahera: Ternate, Tidore. Moti and Makian. Bacan further to the south, and Jailolo on Halmahera, were also commonly included in Maluku Proper, the four kingdoms forming a ritual quadripartition with connotations to local cosmology.

The etymology of the word Maluku is not very clear, and it has been a matter of debate for many experts. The first recorded word that can be identified with Maluku comes from Nagarakretagama, an Old Javanese eulogy of 1365. Canto 14 stanza 5 mentioned Maloko, which Pigeaud identified with Ternate or Moluccas. A theory holds that the name Maluku comes from the concept of "Maluku Kie Raha". "Raha" means four, while "kie" here means mountain. referring to 4 mountains of Ternate, Tidore, Bacan, and Jailolo (Halmahera) which have their own kolano (title for local kings). Therefore, the Maluku can come from: "Moloku" here means to grasp or hold. Using these the meaning of "Moloku Kie Raha" is "confederation of four mountain". However the root word "loku" comes from local Malay creole word for a unit, therefore not an indigenous language. The other idea is the word originated from "Maloko" which is a combination of "Ma" which is for support and "Loko" refer to area. The phrase "Maloko Kie Raha" means "the place/world which has four mountains".

== History ==
=== Precolonial era ===
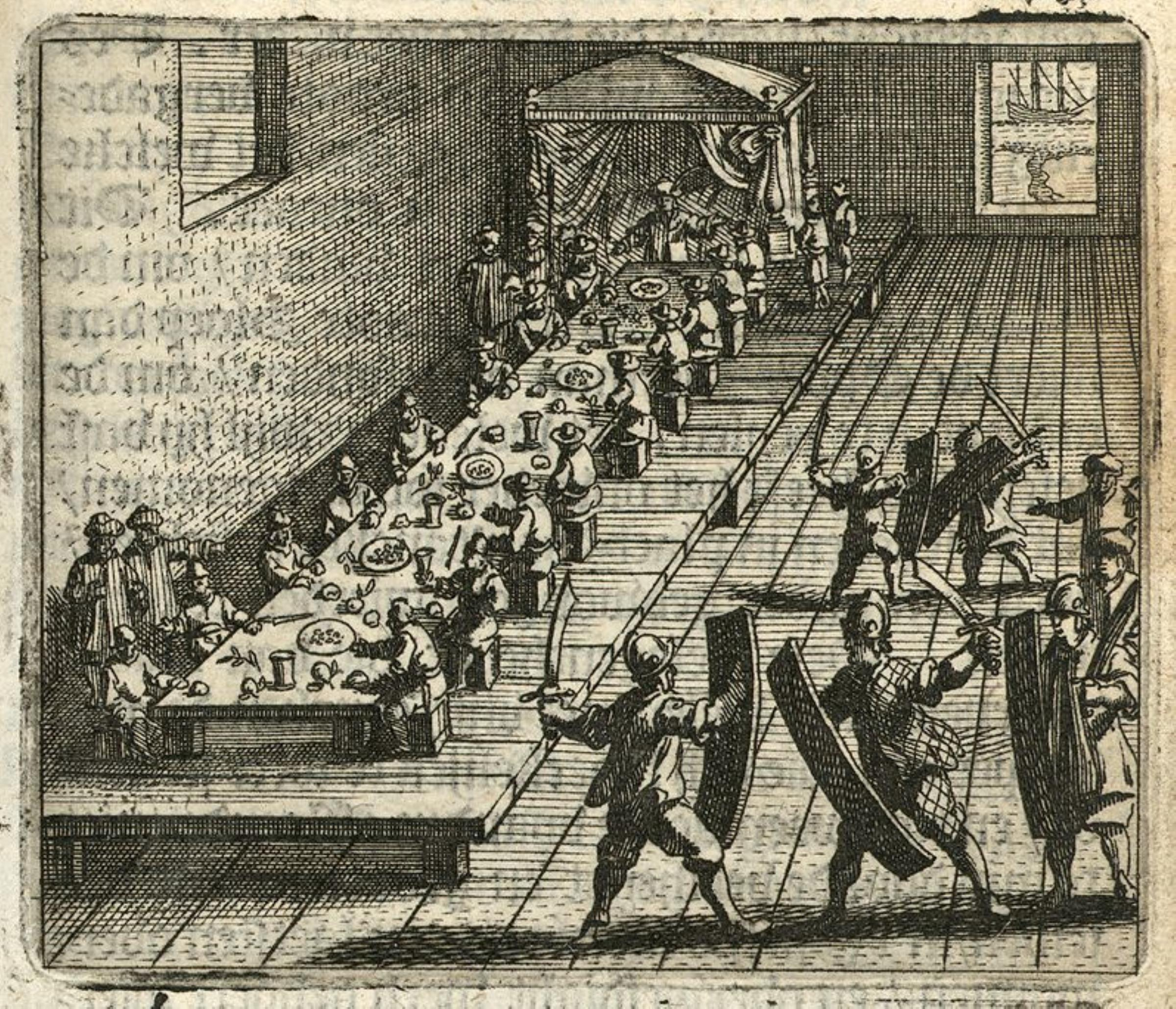
Dutch being entertained by the king of Ternate

The island of Ternate or Gapi began to grow in the early 13th century. The early Ternate population was the result of an exodus from Halmahera. Initially there were four villages in Ternate, each headed by a momole (head of a clan). they were the first to make contact with merchants who came looking for spices. The population of Ternate became increasingly heterogeneous with settlements of Arab, Javanese, Malay and Chinese traders. With the increasingly busy trading activities there was an increase of threats coming from pirates, the Momole Guna Tobona leaders held a conference to form a stronger organization and appoint a single leader as king.

In 1257, according to traditional chronology, Momole Cico, Sampalu's leader was elected and appointed as the first kolano (king) with the title Baab Mashur Malamo (1257-1277). The Kingdom of Gapi was centered in the village of Ternate, which later grew bigger and more populous, the population was also referred as Gam Lamo or the big village (later Gamalama). Ternate was the largest and most populous settlement on the island, so the people would call the kingdom Ternate rather than Gapi. Under the leadership of several generations of rulers, Ternate developed from a kingdom on a small island, to becoming the largest and most influential country in eastern Indonesia, especially in the Moluccas. It was organized in settlement units called soa which stood under a headmen or bobato. At the top, the kolano was assisted by four chief officials, dopolo ngaruha, led by a first minister or jogugu.

Starting in the mid-15th century, Islam was adopted by the leading families in the kingdom, due to the influence of Muslim merchants from Java, India and the Malay World. Some aspects of Islamic law were applied, though Islam was only patchily disseminated until the second half of the 16th century. Sultan Zainal Abidin substituted the title of kolano with that of Sultan, following other rulers from the Malay World. With this, Muslim scholars became important figures in the Ternate kingdom.

Opposite to Ternate lies the island of Tidore, the seat of the Kingdom of Tidore, or Duko. According to the genealogies of the kings of Ternate and Tidore, the first kolano of Tidore was Sahjati (Muhammad Naqil) who ascended the throne in 1081. The ruler was known as Kië ma-kolano, "King of the Mountain". It was only at the end of the 15th century that Islam was adopted as the official religion of the kingdom. The 9th King of Tidore, Sultan Jamaluddin, chose to convert to Islam because of the preaching of Sheikh Mansur from Arabia. Of the other two kingdoms, Jailolo was the most powerful in the Moluccas in the pre-European era until its powers dissipated in the 16th century. Bacan had importance as a link between the Austronesian and the Papuans in the 16th century, but also shrank to insignificance due to military setbacks and severe population decline in the 16th and early 17th centuries.

=== Colonial era ===
The first European to land in the Moluccas was Ludovico di Varthema, an Italian explorer who claims to have visited the region in 1505. In 1512, the Portuguese set foot in Ternate for the first time under the leadership of Francisco Serrão. With the approval of Sultan Bayan Sirrullah, Portugal was allowed to establish a trading post in Ternate. Portugal came not only to share the trading opportunities, but to control the commerce in spices, nutmeg and cloves, in Maluku. For this reason, the foreigners first had to subordinate to Ternate. Their superior weaponry and possession of the trading entrepôt of Malacca made them attractive as allies. But as soon as they were permanently established, the Europeans began to interfere in local politics. Simultaneously, Al-Mansur of Tidore received the remnants of the Magellan expedition in 1521 and tried to secure the Spanish as allies, though the presence of Spain in Maluku were very limited up to 1582. Ternate and Tidore lived in a near-permanent state of rivalry during the 16th and 17th centuries, though there was also a ritual dualism in their relationship.

Sultan Bayan Sirrullah died in 1521, leaving heirs who were still very young. The Tidorese princess Nukila, the widow of the sultan, and Prince Taruwese, son of the deceased sultan by a low-ranking wife, acted as guardians. Queen Mother Nukila intended to unite Ternate and Tidore under one crown, headed by one of her two sons, Pangeran Hidayat (later Sultan Dayalu) or prince Abu Hayat (later Sultan Abu Hayat II). Meanwhile, Prince Tarruwese wanted the throne for himself.

The Portuguese took advantage of this opportunity and pitted them against each other, resulting in civil strife. Queen Nukila's side was supported by Tidore while Prince Taruwese was supported by Portugal. After overcoming his adversary, Prince Taruwese was in turn betrayed and killed by the Portuguese. The Portuguese captain acted as an adviser to the kingdom. Through his influence, the royal council was persuaded to appoint prince Tabariji as sultan in 1533. But when the Ternatans began to show hostility to Christianized regions in Halmahera, Tabariji was exiled to the Portuguese colony of Goa, India in 1535. There he was converted to Christianity and was later pushed to write a testament that bequeathed Ternate to the King of Portugal. This made the next sultan Hairun a vassal of Portugal, but he disregarded the testament and built up his power behind the backs of the Portuguese.

Portugal helped Hairun conquer the Jailolo kingdom in 1551, reducing it to a Ternate vassal. However, because of the treatment of his brothers and himself caused deep resentment of Sultan Hairun. He tried to weaken the Portuguese positions in Maluku, sending expeditions to attack the partly Christianized Ambon Island. The actions of the Portuguese also caused anger among the people who backed the Sultan. In response, the Portuguese captain, Diogo Lopes de Mesquita invited Hairun for negotiations but murdered the sultan who entered the fort without his bodyguards.

The assassination of Sultan Hairun incited the people of Ternate to expel Portugal. Even other parts of the Moluccas chose to support the leadership and struggle of the new Sultan Baabullah. The fortresses of Portugal throughout Maluku and the eastern regions of Indonesia were attacked. After five years of war, the Portuguese were expelled from northern Maluku in 1575. Under the leadership of Sultan Baabullah, the power of Ternate reached its peak. His area of influence stretched from North and Central Sulawesi in the west to the Papuan Islands in the east, from the southern Philippines in the north to the Lesser Sunda Islands in the south. The Bacan Sultanate, whose ruler, Dom João Hairun, had converted to Christianity, was also forced to apostate and yield. However, the Portuguese held out in Ambon and established a fortress in Tidore in 1578, since the Tidorese Sultan Gapi Baguna began to fear Baabullah's ambitions.

After the death of Sultan Baabullah, the sultanate began to weaken. The Spanish, who had united with Portugal in 1580, tried to regain control of Maluku by attacking Ternate via the Iberian base in Tidore. With Spain strengthening its position in the Philippines, Ternate formed an alliance with local Muslim lords in Mindanao to drive off the Spanish, but failed. Sultan Saidi Berkat defeated several invasion attempts, but was eventually captured by the Spaniards in 1606 and exiled to Manila. The Spanish-allied Tidore took over some Ternatan dependencies.

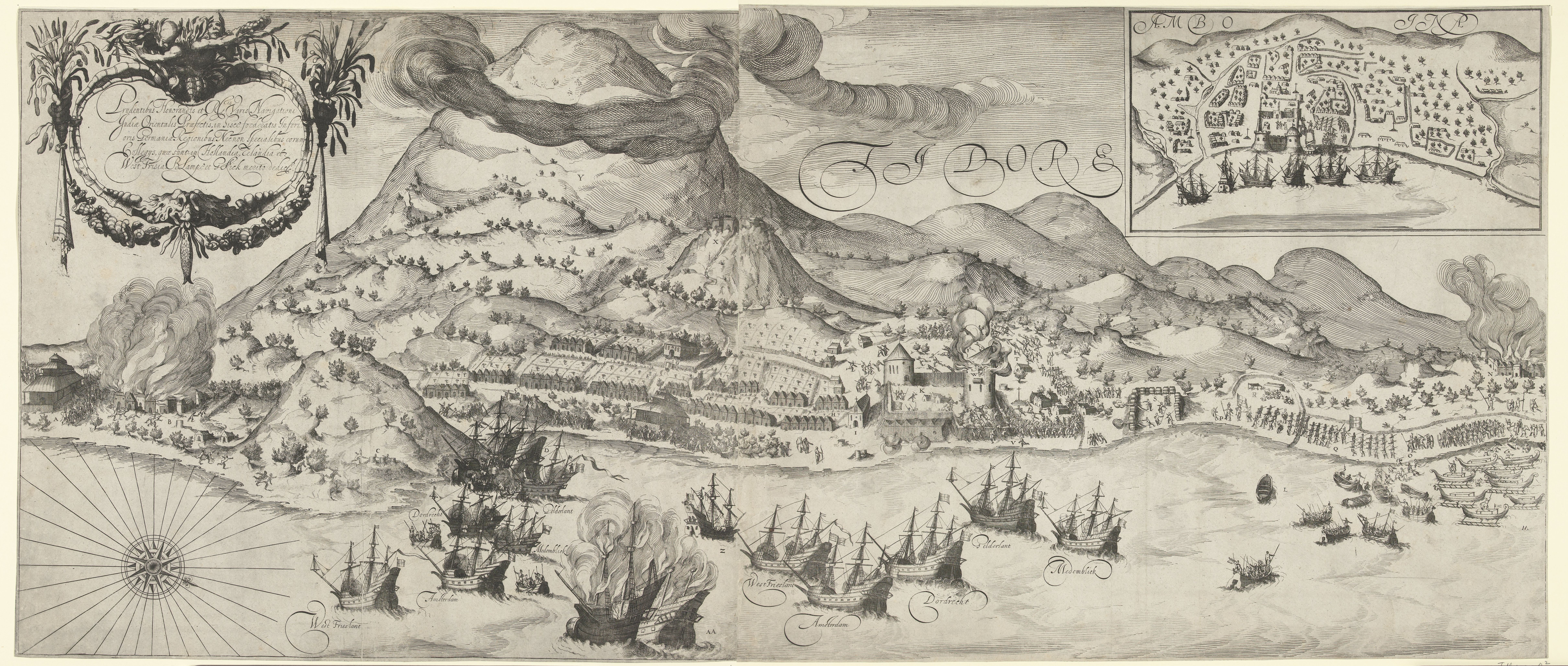
The VOC and the Sultan of Ternate attack Tidore in May 1605 and capture the Portuguese fort, an event triggering Spanish retaliation in the following year.

Surviving Ternatan aristocrats requested the help from the Dutch, the Dutch responded and helped Sultan Mudafar Syah I to reestablish himself on Ternate Island. On 26 June 1607 the sultan signed a contract that gave the Dutch East India Company (VOC) a monopoly in purchasing spices in his realm, in return for Dutch assistance against Spain. In 1607, the Dutch also built Fort Oranje on Ternate, which was their first stronghold in the archipelago. The VOC expelled the Spanish from most of Maluku in the following years, though Spain kept Tidore and Fort Gammalamo in Ternate until 1663. The unbalanced relationship between the Netherlands and Ternate caused dissatisfaction with the rulers and nobles of Ternate. Among them were Hidayat, a young Ambonese kimelaha (governor) who was also a former regent of Ternate and led the opposition against both Mudafar Syah and the Dutch. He ignored the Dutch trade monopoly agreement by selling spices to Javanese and Makassar traders. The resistance offered by him and his successors, and by the Muslim vassal state Hitu on Ambon, led to a long series of wars up to the 1650s where the VOC subjugated Ambon with Ternate's assistance.

Meanwhile, the Sultanate of Tidore succeeded in preventing direct Dutch interference in their territory and remained independent until the end of the 18th century. Over the 17th century Tidore built up its positions in south-east Halmahera and Papua that yielded foodstuff, forest products and slaves. However, the VOC eventually succeeded in pacifying Ternate and Tidore. In its height, the VOC pursued an orderly, and controlling strategy, helped by a strong and flexible organization. Both Ternate and Tidore agreed to extirpate all clove trees in their realms in the 1650s, ensuring Dutch monopoly on clove cultivation. Because of the colonial policy, Maluku became an economic backwater after the mid-17th century. On the other hand, the rulers were able to strengthen their personal powers with their subjects under European protection. Ternate was reduced to a vassal of the VOC in 1682, and Tidore met the same fate in 1780. The Tidorese prince Nuku led a successful anti-Dutch rebellion that encompassed much of Maluku and western Papua in 1780–1805. Helped by the British invasion in 1796–1803 he was able to push back Dutch positions, but resistance collapsed after his death. In the end, Ternate and Tidore as well as other kingdoms in Maluku were incorporated in the Dutch East Indies. For more than a century after 1816, the archipelago remained under strict Dutch control, though the sultanates Ternate, Tidore and Bacan remained as zelfbesturende landschappen (self-ruling territories) until the Indonesian Revolution.

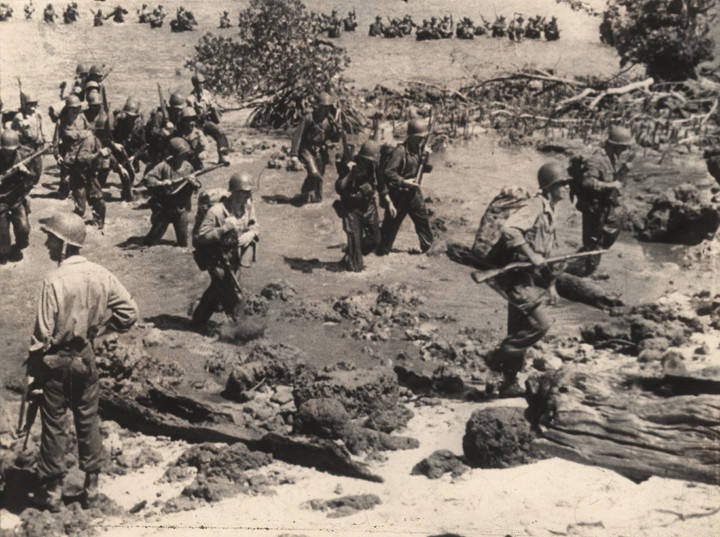
United States Army 31st Infantry Division landing in Morotai during the Battle of Morotai

=== Modern era ===
The Empire of Japan invaded Maluku early in 1942 as part of its Dutch East Indies Campaign of World War II, ousting the Dutch from the region. Halmahera became the site of a Japanese naval base at Kao Bay. 2 years later, US forces and their allies launched the Battle of Morotai in 1944; bombing the island in August and invading it in September. Imperial Japanese forces on Morotai held out until 1945 but failed to expel the Allies. In the latter part of 1944, 61,000 personnel landed on Morotai. Two thirds of them were engineers, who rapidly established facilities including harbors and two airstrips plus extensive fuel stores. The formal surrender of the Second Japanese Army took place at Morotai on 9 September 1945. The last Japanese holdout from the war, Private Teruo Nakamura (Amis: Attun Palalin), was discovered by the Indonesian Air Force on Morotai, and surrendered to a search patrol on December 18, 1974.

After the Japanese surrendered, the Dutch regained control of the region, before handing it over to the Indonesian government in 1949. In 1957, the Permesta movement was declared in Manado, North Sulawesi, aiming to overthrow the Indonesian government, The movement received support from the United States and Taiwan. In January 1958 the CIA began developing covert support networks to the PRRI and Permesta rebels. Supported by the American, Permesta forces captures Morotai and Halmahera as well as several islands. In May 1958 Indonesian National Armed Forces started to gather amphibious forces to retake both Morotai and the rebel-held town of Jailolo on the island of Halmahera. By May 16 the assault fleet started to gather in Ambon harbour and on May 20 its troops landed on Morotai while élite Pasukan Gerak Tjepat (PGT or "Quick Reaction Force") troops parachuted onto the island. Permesta forces surrendered as the island was captured in less than a month. It alarmed the Permesta rebels on Jailolo, many of whom fled back to North Sulawesi. Thereafter the rebellion was largely confined to the Minahassa Peninsula of Sulawesi, where Permesta remnants waged a guerilla campaign until the last unit surrendered in January 1962.

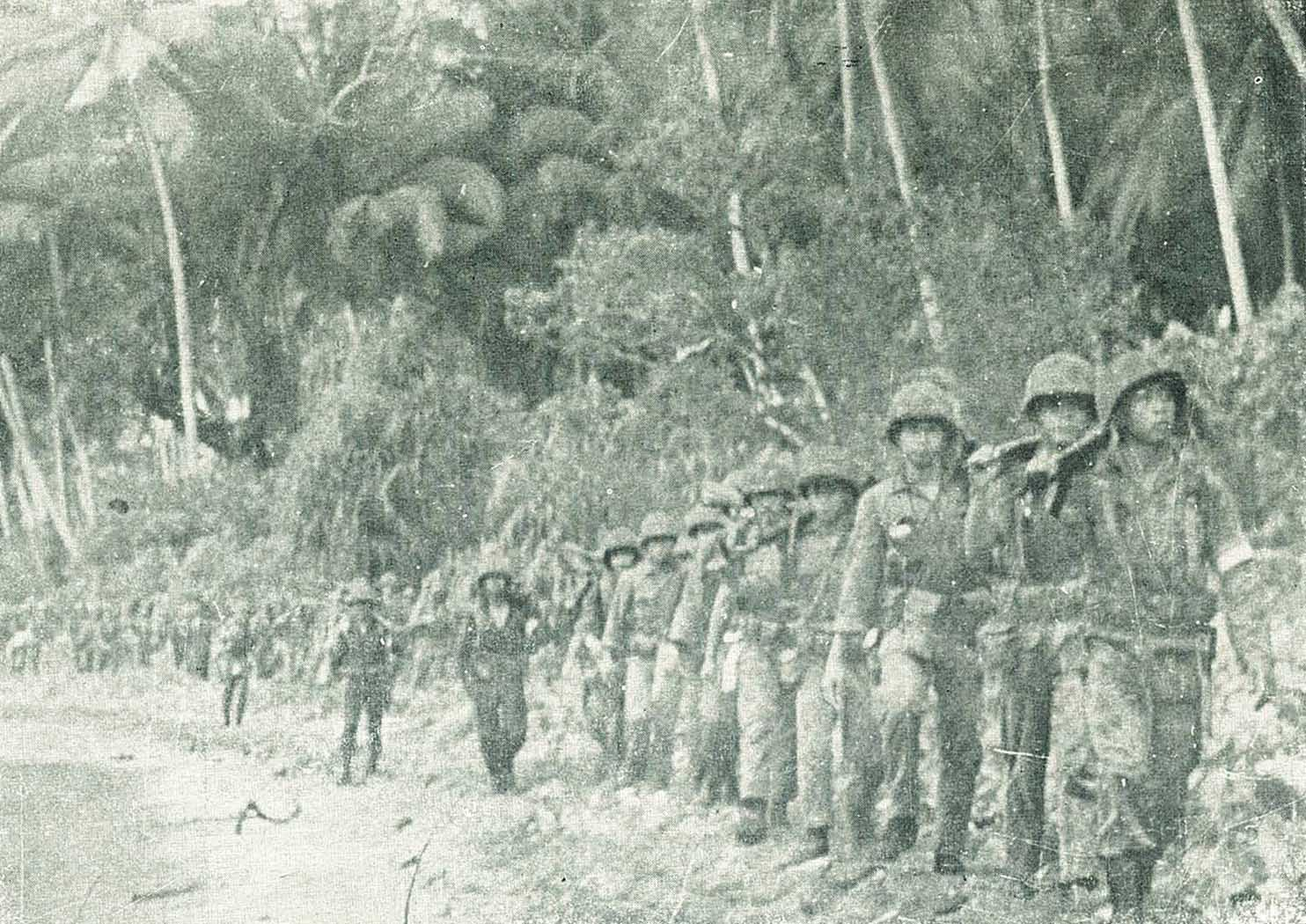
Indonesian Navy Commando Corps on Morotai Beach during the Permesta insurgency

During the administration of President B. J. Habibie, the idea emerged to accelerate development in several potential regions by forming new provinces. Maluku was one of the potential areas for accelerating development through the parttion of the province, mainly because of the pace of development between the northern and southern regions and or between the middle and southeast regions were uneven. On that basis, the government established North Maluku Province (with the temporary capital in Ternate) which was confirmed by Law Number 46 of 1999 concerning the division of North Maluku Province, Buru Regency and Tanimbar Islands Regency.

North Maluku was also the site of the Maluku sectarian conflict. Although the area was more peaceful than the neighbouring Maluku province, there were several clashes between Christians and Muslims in Ternate and Halmahera. Several people were killed in Kao, Halmahera as residents of both faiths and Makianese Muslim migrants fought for three days, the violence had started with the invasion of Sosol, one of the two villages destroyed by the Makianese gang. A team of leaders was tasked with securing peace by the regional government, however no modifications were made to the redistricting decision and tension remained. The conflict spread from Halmahera to neighbouring Ternate and Tidore. On 6 November 1999, a several-hundred strong Muslim gang, led by local Makianese political elite and thought to be mostly Makianese refugees, raged through Ternate attacking the Christian minority there. The police forces of Ternate were only able to guard their own institutions from attack, yet the traditional guards of the Sultan of Ternate, mostly composed of local Ternate Muslims, were particularly effective at protecting the local Christian population from attack. The Sultan's guard had both established secure perimeters around areas of the city, including the mostly Chinese-owned business district, and physically stood between the mobs and possible victims in some cases and were later commended for preventing a potential massacre. At least 4 people died, however, and the Indonesian Navy later evacuated the several thousand Christian residents of both islands to Bitung and Manado in North Sulawesi.

The conflict was resolved after the Malino II Accord was signed by both parties.

== Geography ==
The islands of North Maluku are mostly of volcanic origin, with the volcanoes of Dukono on Halmahera and Gamalama on Ternate still active and the whole of Tidore consisting of a large stratovolcano.

The largest of the 1,474 islands are Halmahera (with an area of 18,039.6 km^{2}, or 56.4% of the land area of the province), Taliabu (2,913.2 km^{2}), Obi (2,542.3 km^{2}), Morotai (2,266.4 km^{2}), Bacan (1,899.8 km^{2}), Mangole (1,228.5 km^{2}), Sulabesi (557.8 km^{2}), Kasiruta (472.67 km^{2}) and Mandioli (229.8 km^{2}).

The North Maluku Islands are formed by the movement of three tectonic plates, namely Eurasia, the Pacific and Indo-Australia which have occurred over geological ages. This movement formed the volcanic archipelago that stretched from north to south off western Halmahera, including Hiri Island, Ternate Island, Tidore Island, Mare Island, Moti Island and Makian Island. Each of these islands constitutes a stratovolcano. Further south lie the Kayoa and Bacan Islands (there are also two stratovolcanoes on Bacan Island). Halmahera Island itself is a volcanic island even though volcanic activity occurs only in a part of its territory.

The islands have a tropical rainforest climate (Af).

== Ecology ==
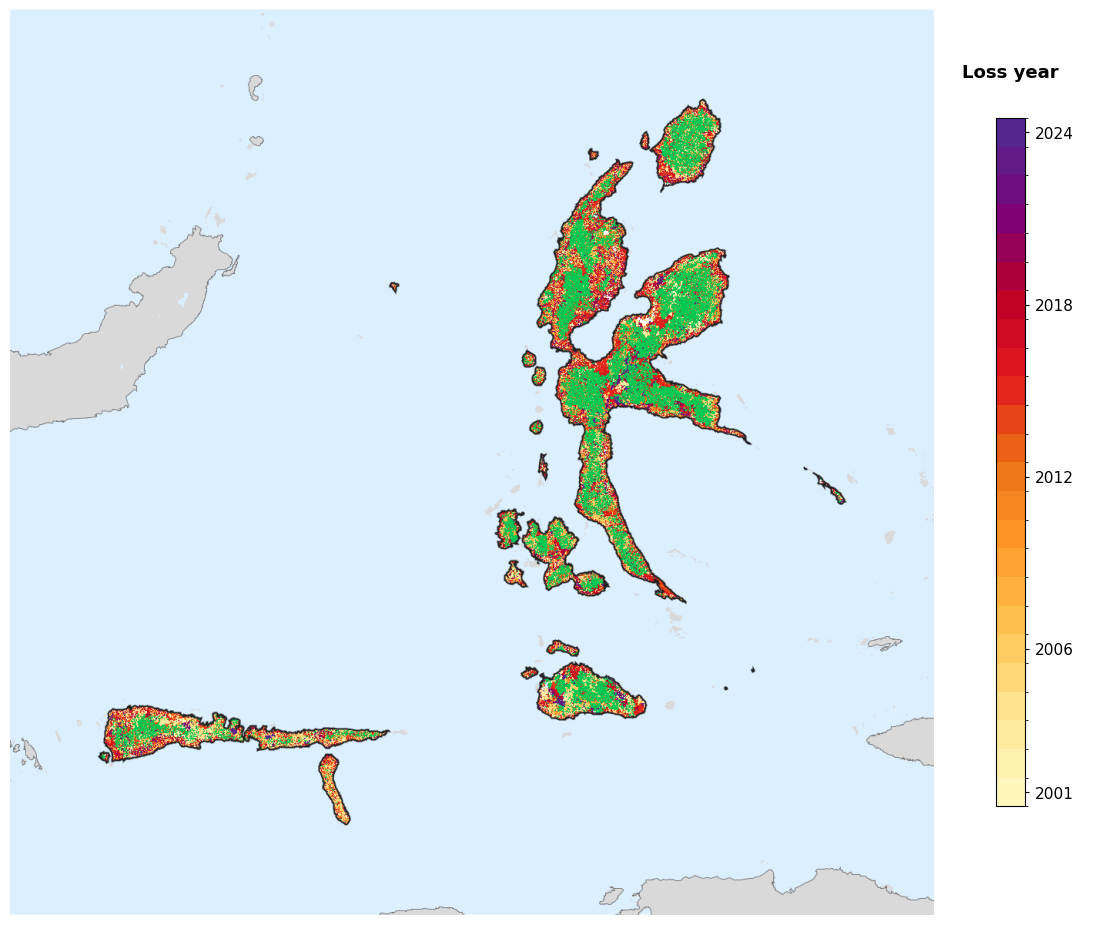
Tree-cover loss year in North Maluku, 2001-2024, from the Global Forest Change dataset.

The rainforests of Halmahera, Morotai, the Obi Islands, the Bacan islands and other islands of North Maluku have been described by the World Wildlife Fund as the Halmahera rain forests ecoregion and are home to a number of plant and animal species unique to the islands, which are in the Wallacea transition zone, containing a mixture of species of Asian and Australasian origin. The predominant trees of the forest are Anisoptera thurifera, Hopea gregaria, Hopea iriana, Shorea assamica, Shorea montigena, Shorea selanica, and Vatica rassak.

The endemic mammals found here include the Obi mosaic-tailed rat (Melomys obiensis), masked flying fox (Pteropus personatus), and four arboreal marsupials, the ornate (Phalanger ornatus), Rothschild's (P. rothschildi), blue-eyed (P. matabiru) and Gebe (P. alexandrae) cuscuses. There are over two hundred different birds on the islands, twenty-six of which are endemic, a large number for this small island group. The endemics include four birds which are the only species in their genera, including the elusive invisible rail (Habroptila wallacii), the white-streaked friarbird (Melitograis gilolensis), and two birds of paradise, the paradise-crow (Lycocorax pyrrhopterus) and Wallace's standardwing (Semioptera wallacii). The islands are also home to the largest bee in the world, Wallace's giant bee (Megachile pluto).

Most of the natural forest remains on these mountainous islands, although much of the coastal and lowland areas have been cleared for clove-planting since the sixteenth century, especially on the islands of Ternate and Tidore. Logging has occurred more recently on Halmahera and Morotai.

The Sula Islands are part of the Sulawesi lowland rain forests ecoregion.

== Government and administrative divisions ==
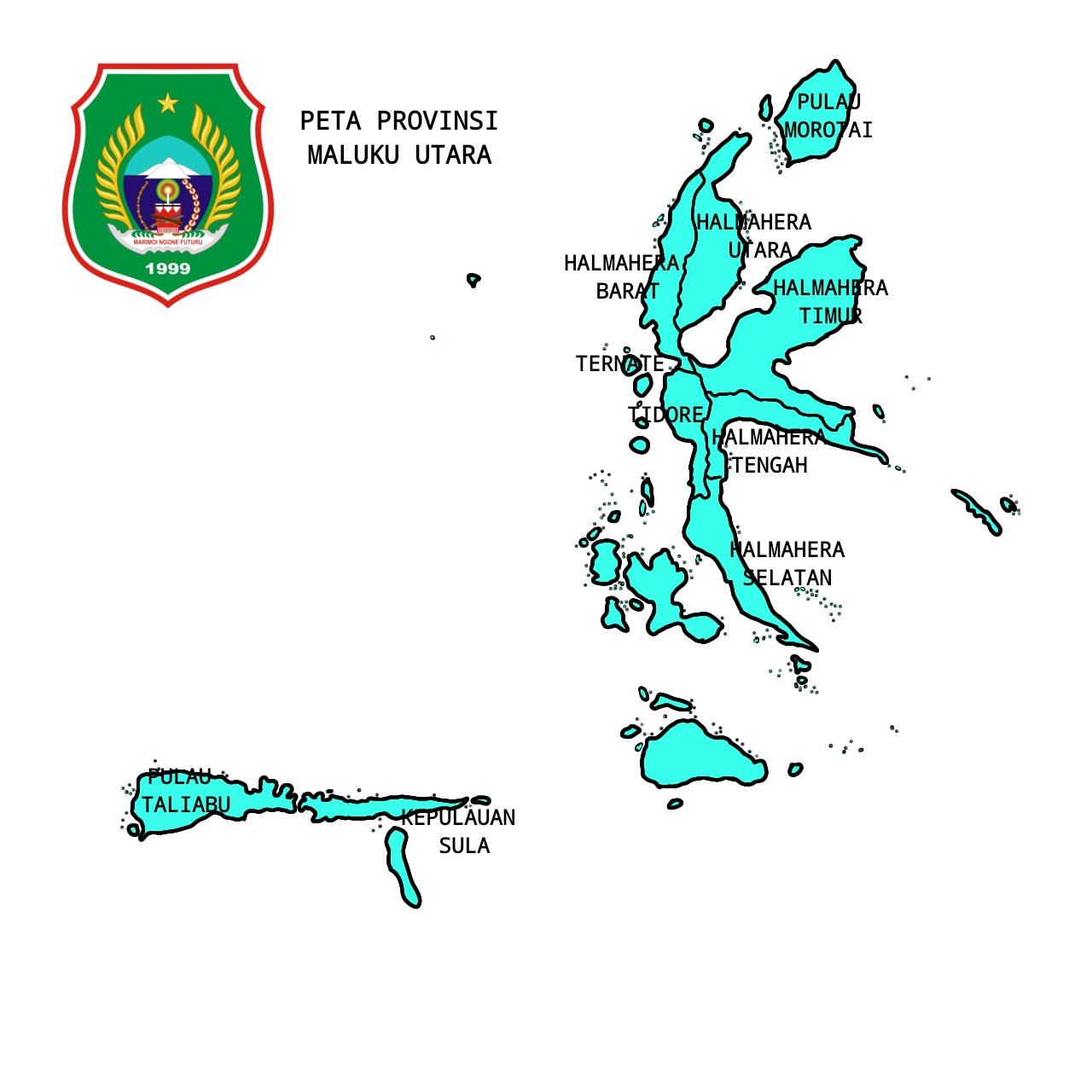
North Maluku Administrative Division

In 1999, the northern part of Maluku, then comprising the North Maluku (Maluku Utara) Regency, the Central Halmahera (Halmahera Tengah) Regency, and the City of Ternate, was split off to form a separate province of North Maluku (Maluku Utara). The existing North Maluku Regency was, on 25 February 2003 (by law Undang-Undang Nomor 1 Tahun 2003), split into four new regencies—North Halmahera, West Halmahera, South Halmahera, and the Sula Islands—while on the same date, two new entities were created from parts of the Central Halmahera Regency: East Halmahera Regency and the new city of Tidore Islands. A seventh regency, covering Morotai Island, was formed on 29 October 2008 from part of North Halmahera, and an eighth regency, covering Taliabu Island, was formed on 14 December 2012 from the westernmost island in the Sula Islands Regency. All are listed below with their areas and their populations at the 2010 and 2020 Censuses, and according to the official estimates for mid 2025. The table also includes the number of administrative districts (kecamatan) in each city or regency, the number of administrative villages (rural desa and urban kelurahan) into which those districts are subdivided, and the numbers of named islands.

Kode Wilayah	Name of City or Regency	Area in km^{2}	Pop'n 2010 Census	Pop'n 2020 Census	Pop'n mid 2025 Estimate	No. of Districts	No. of Villages	No. of Islands	Capital	HDI 2022
82.01	West Halmahera Regency (Halmahera Barat)	2,237.39	100,424	132,349	139,130	8	169	139	Jailolo	0.662 (Medium)
82.02	Central Halmahera Regency (Halmahera Tengah)	2,272.26	42,815	56,802	63,100 (a)	10	61	43	Weda	0.664 (Medium)
82.03	North Halmahera Regency (Halmahera Utara)	3,402.94	161,847	197,638	210,260	17	196	83	Tobelo	0.683 (Medium)
82.04	South Halmahera Regency (Halmahera Selatan)	8,102.00	198,911	248,395	269,010	30	249	355	Labuha	0.650 (Medium)
82.05	Sula Islands Regency (Kepulauan Sula)	1,777.02	85,215	104,082	110,540	12	78	32	Sanana	0.647 (Medium)
82.06	East Halmahera Regency (Halmahera Timur)	6,487.63	73,109	91,707	99,870	10	102	41	Maba	0.679 (Medium)
82.07	Morotai Island Regency (Pulau Morotai)	2,337.26	52,697	74,436	80,970	5	88	31	Daruba	0.638 (Medium)
82.08	Taliabu Island Regency (Pulau Taliabu)	2,984.01	47,309	58,047	62,230	8	71	54	Bobong	0.616 (Medium)
82.71	Ternate City	162.04	185,705	205,001	216,770	7	77	10	-	0.808 (Very High)
82.72	Tidore Islands City	1,703.43	90,055	114,480	121,950	8	89	11	-	0.715 (High)
	Total Province	31,465.98	1,038,087	1,282,937	1,373,820	115	1,180	781		0.694 (Medium)

Notes: (a) The Regency-level BPS publication for mid 2025 shows a population figure of 115,083 for Central Halmahera which is wildly different from the Provincial-level publication figures given above. Note several of the figures for areas also show great disparity between the BPS figures published by the Province and those published by the Regencies, although both sets are "official".

The province now forms one of Indonesia's 84 national electoral districts to elect members to the People's Representative Council. The North Maluku Electoral District consists of all of the 8 regencies and 2 cities in the province, and elects 3 members to the People's Representative Council.

== Economy ==
In the 2010s, efforts were undertaken to further develop the province. Governor Abdul Ghani Kasuba designated South Halmahera as a tourism region for the province, inaugurating the Widi International Fishing Tournament for that purpose. Kasuba also successfully negotiated with the China-based Jinchun Group to build a nine-trillion rupiah nickel smelter in the Obi Islands. The Central Halmahera Regency is home to the Weda Bay Industrial Park, one of the worlds' largest nickel processing sites.

== Demographics ==
=== Population ===
The population of North Maluku at the 2020 Census was 1,282,937 people spread across eight regencies and two cities, but by mid 2025 this was officially estimated to have reached 1,373,820. South Halmahera Regency is the regency that has the largest population, with 269,010 people in mid 2025 or 19.58% of the province's total population, followed by Ternate city with 216,770 people in 2025, or 15.78%, while the regencies that have the smallest populations are Central Halmahera Regency with 63,100 people or just 4.59% (but see Note (a) above referring to the much larger figure quoted by the Regency-level BPS), and Taliabu Island Regency with 62,230 people or just 4.53%. The average annual population growth rate in North Maluku was 2.07% between 2010 and 2020, but fell to 1.45% between 2020 and 2025; Central Halmahera Regency was the region with the highest annual population growth rate of 2.24% per year between 2020 and 2025, while the area with the lowest annual population growth rate was West Halmahera with 1.06% per year. With an area of 34,138.36 km^{2} and a population of 1,355,620 in mid 2024, the population density in North Maluku was 43.66 per km^{2} in 2025; the area with the highest density was Ternate with a density of 1,337.76 per km^{2}, while the region with the lowest density was East Halmahera Regency with a density of only 15.39 per km^{2}.

=== Ethnic groups ===
North Maluku has a very diverse population. In total there are around 28 ethnic groups and languages in North Maluku. They are divided into two families of languages based on the language used, namely Austronesian and Papuan. Austronesian groups live in the central and eastern parts of Halmahera. They include the Buli, Maba, Patani, Sawai and Weda peoples. North and West Halmahera are dominated by Papuan-speaking ethnic groups, i.e. Galela, Tobelo, Loloda, Tobaru, Modole, Togutil, Pagu, Waioli, Ibu, Sahu, Ternate and Tidore. In the Sula Islands, there are several ethnic groups such as the Kadai, Mange and Siboyo peoples. Most people in this area have a command of Ternate Malay.

=== Religion ===
Religion in North Maluku (2022)
religion	percent
Islam	74.70%
Christianity	25.27%
Others	0.03%

Most of the population in North Maluku is Muslim, with Christians (mostly Protestants) a significant minority. Hinduism, Buddhism, and various other religions are practiced by a small part of the population. According to data in 2017, the composition of religion in this province is Islam 75.34%, followed by Christianity 25.27% (Protestant 23.96% and Catholic 0.68%), Hinduism 0.01%, Buddhism 0.01%.

== Tourism ==
Maritime tourism in North Maluku is based on the area's islands and beaches with marine parks and various types of ornamental fish. There are also tourist forests as well as national parks with endemic species ranked 10th in the world. The nature reserve area consists of several types, both on land and in marine waters such as the Sibela Mountain Reserve on Bacan Island, Nature Reserve on Obi Island, Taliabu Nature Reserve on Taliabu Island and Nature Reserve on Seho Island. Cultural Heritage Areas that have archaeological historical values scattered in the North Maluku Province include cultural reserves in Ternate City, Tidore City, West Halmahera.

== See also ==
- Baileo
- Maluku (province)
- List of rulers of Maluku

== Bibliography ==
- Braithwaite, John; Dunn, Leah (2010). "3. Maluku and North Maluku" (PDF). Anomie and Violence: Non-truth and reconciliation in Indonesian peacebuilding. The Australian National University. pp. 147–243. ISBN 978-1-921666-22-3.
- Conboy, Kenneth; Morrison, James (1999). Feet to the Fire CIA Covert Operations in Indonesia, 1957–1958. Annapolis: Naval Institute Press. ISBN 1-55750-193-9.
