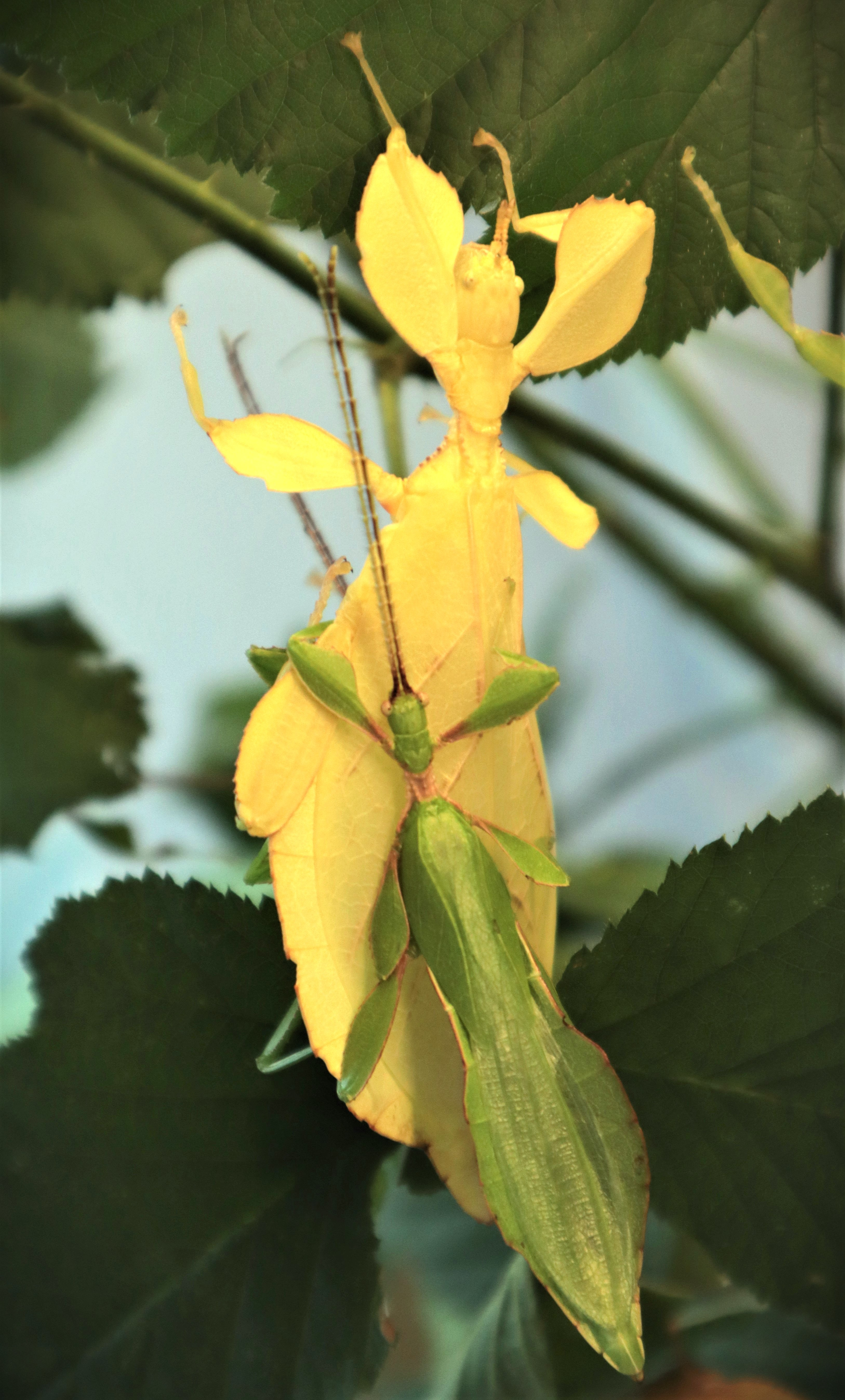
- Pair of Phyllium letiranti

Scientific classification
- Kingdom: Animalia
- Phylum: Arthropoda
- Clade: Pancrustacea
- Class: Insecta
- Order: Phasmatodea
- Superfamily: Phyllioidea
- Family: Phylliidae
- Tribe: Phylliini
- Genus: Phyllium
- Species: P. letiranti

Binomial name
- Phyllium letiranti Cumming & Teemsma, 2018

= Phyllium letiranti =

Species of leaf insect

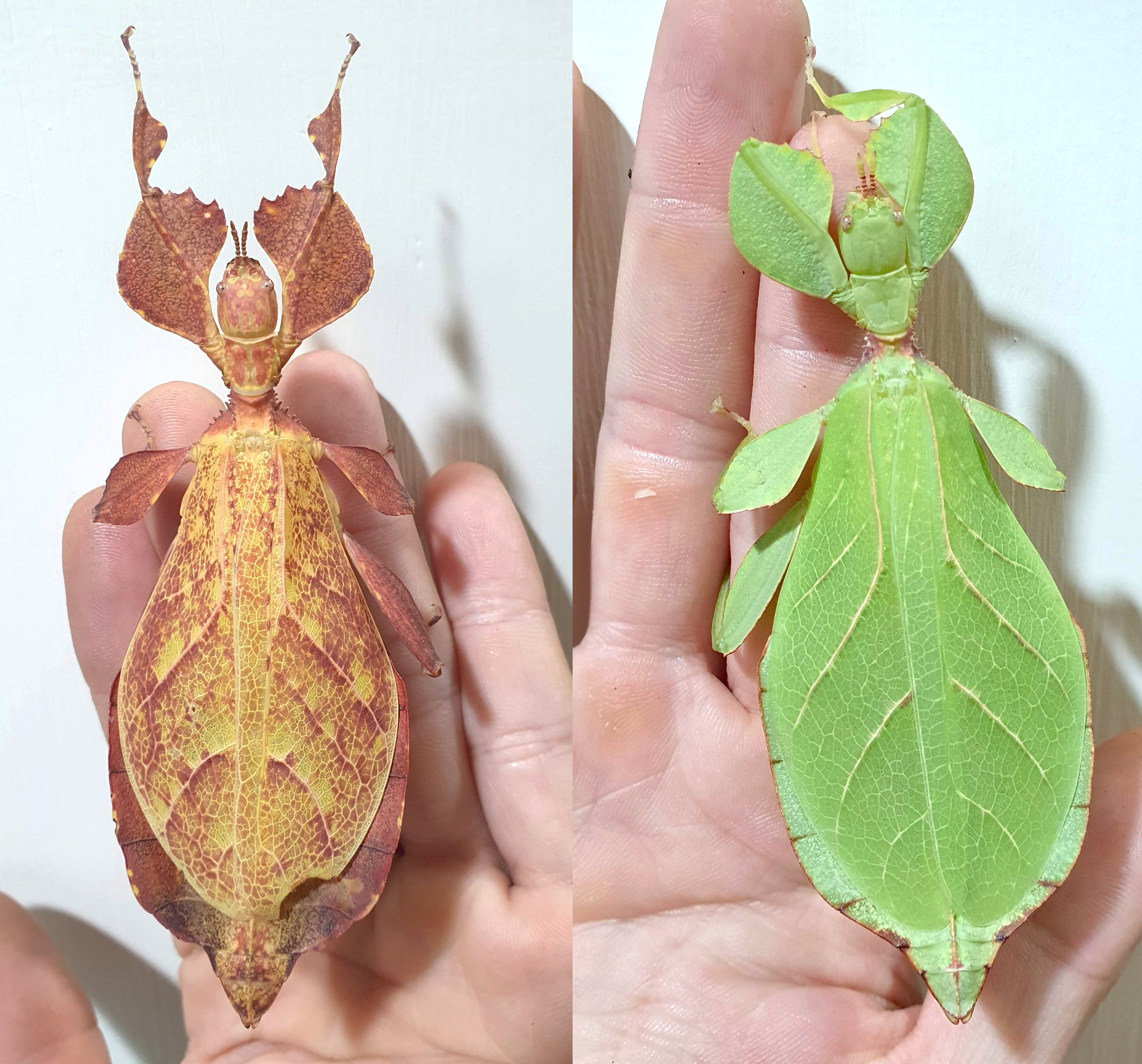
Differently colored females of Phyllium letiranti

Phyllium letiranti is a species of stick insects belonging to the Phylliidae (leaf insects) described in 2018. The species has been recorded on several Indonesian islands east of Sulawesi.

== Description ==
Within the genus Phyllium, the species is comparatively large and morphologically most closely resembles Phyllium mamasaense, Phyllium siccifolium, Phyllium philippinicum, and Phyllium bourquei.

=== Females ===
Females of Phyllium letiranti reach a body length of 86.6 to 91.2 millimetres (3.41 to 3.59 in), or occasionally up to 95 millimetres (3.7 in). Their coloration is highly variable. Individuals may have a green, yellow, orange, greenish-brown, or brown base color. Those ranging from orange to brown display the most vivid patterns, whereas yellow and green individuals can sometimes be solid-colored and unpatterned. As with the females of similar species, the females of Phyllium letiranti possess broad lobes on the femurs of the forelegs (profemoral exterior lobes) that are roughly equal in width to the inner lobes of the forefemora (profemoral interior lobes). Their thorax is also heavily spined and, like that of the other species, features a prominent spine on the anterior margin of the mesopraescutum. The seventh and eighth abdominal segments are extended into gently rounded lobes. Females can be distinguished from Phyllium mamasaense by several characteristics. For instance, Phyllium letiranti females have antennae consisting of ten segments rather than the nine found in Phyllium mamasaense. The third antennal segment bears a stridulatory ridge (Pars stridens) with 35 small teeth in Phyllium letiranti, whereas the ridge has 40 to 46 teeth in Phyllium mamasaense, 30 to 32 in Phyllium siccifolium, and 40 to 42 in Phyllium philippinicum and Phyllium bourquei. Rubbing these antennal segments together produces a stridulation sound used to deter predators or attract males. In Phyllium letiranti, the profemoral interior lobes (inner lobes of the forelegs femurs) feature four prominent, triangular teeth and a smaller tooth in the proximal region. In Phyllium mamasaense, there are two prominent teeth here, with two to three small accessory teeth situated between or beside them. Phyllium siccifolium has six slenderer, triangular teeth, while Phyllium philippinicum and Phyllium bourquei have five to seven small, saw-like teeth. Furthermore, the width of the inner lobes of the foretibiae (protibal interior lobes) is at least twice that of the protibial shaft itself, and they are distinctly angular. In Phyllium philippinicum and Phyllium bourquei, the lobes are at most 1.5 times the width of the protibial shaft and are narrow and gently rounded. In Phyllium siccifolium, they diverge distinctly and gradually along their entire length. Regardless of the females' base coloration, the mid- and hind coxae (meso- and metacoxae) are always orange at the rear. Both Phyllium mamasaense and Phyllium hennemanni exhibit a black spot in this area. The forewings (tegmina) of female Phyllium letiranti show slight variations in length, extending from the middle of the seventh abdominal segment to a maximum of the middle of the eighth segment. The hindwings (alae) are vestigial and measure only about 4.4 mm in length.

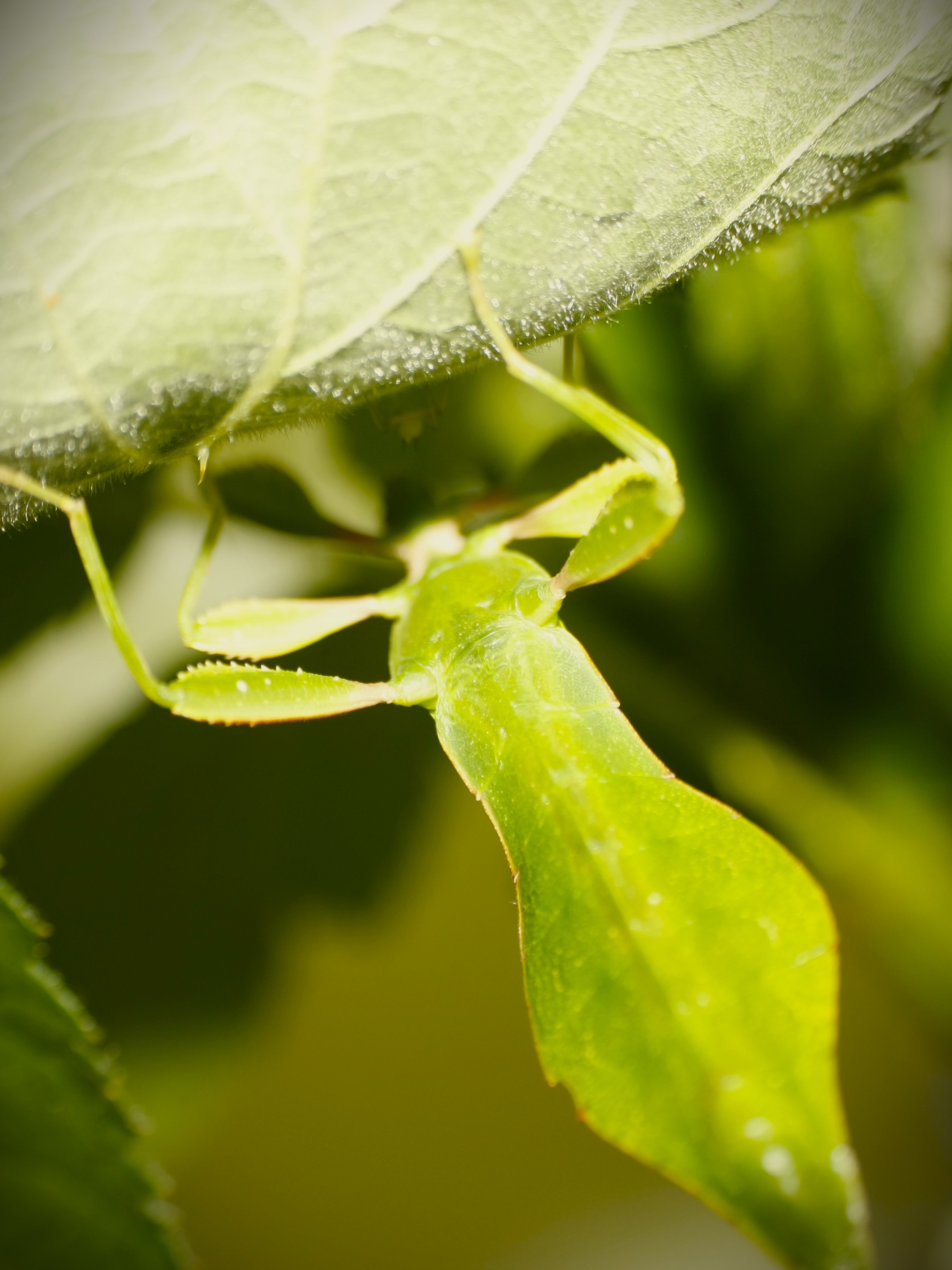
Male from ventral with view of the coxae

=== Males ===
The males of Phyllium letiranti, which are always green, measure 57.6 to 62.2 millimetres (2.27 to 2.45 in), or more rarely up to 70 millimetres (2.8 in). They most closely resemble Phyllium siccifolium. Both species exhibit similarly pronounced thoracic spination, featuring a distinct mesopraescutum ridge along the lateral plane and a prominent spine on the anterior margin of the mesopraescutum. The shape of the abdomen is also similar. In both species, the abdomen is broad in the middle and rounded, giving it an oval appearance. In contrast, the abdomens of Phyllium philippinicum and Phyllium bourquei have converging lateral margins, lending them a slender, spatulate appearance. The inner lobes on the foreleg tibiae (protibial interior lobes) of Phyllium letiranti taper into an isosceles triangle shape that is widened at the distal end. In Phyllium philippinicum and Phyllium bourquei, these lobes are evenly arc-shaped rather than distinctly triangular. Males of Phyllium letiranti differ from those of Phyllium siccifolium in the structure of the mesothoracic pleura. In Phyllium letiranti, these are not particularly broad and only begin to widen at approximately half the length of the mesopraescutum. Their lateral margins feature three to four larger tubercles in the center, flanked by two slightly smaller ones both anteriorly and posteriorly. In Phyllium siccifolium, the mesopleurae widen significantly along their entire length and exhibit five prominent yet blunt tubercles. The antennae of Phyllium letiranti consist of 23 to 25 segments. All segments except the scapus (first segment, also known as basal segment), the pedicellus (second segment), and the four terminal segments are covered with moderately dense, dark bristles that are as long as the width of the respective antennal segment. The meso- and metacoxae are not orange as in the females, but light green to whitish. The tegmina (forewings) are long and reach the anterior margin of the fourth abdominal segment. The alae (hindwings) are long and well-developed. They are shaped like an oval fan and extend to the ninth abdominal segment, or sometimes as far as the middle of the tenth.

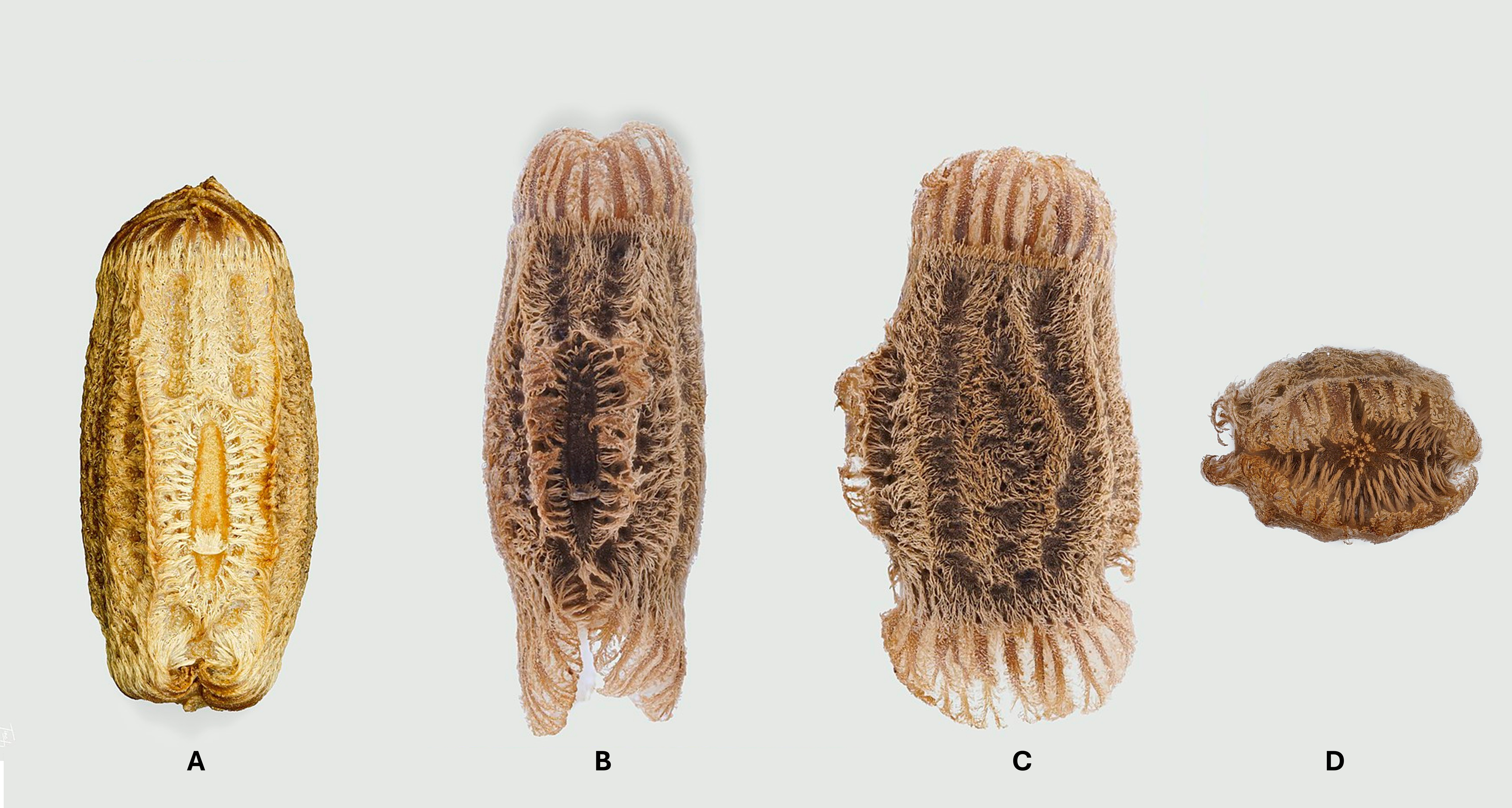
A: Egg with not yet unfolded pinnae; B–D: Eggs with fully unfolded pinnae; A & B: dorsal view; C: lateral view; D: view from above (opercular)

=== Eggs ===
Freshly laid eggs are orange-brown, approximately 5 millimetres (0.20 in) long and 3 millimetres (0.12 in) wide. The lateral surfaces of the eggs are flattened, while the dorsal surface - bearing the micropylar plate - is slightly convex, giving the egg a slight curvature. In lateral view, the width of the capsule at the anterior end is roughly equal to that at the posterior end. The width at the midpoint is slightly greater than near the posterior end but exceeds the capsule width at the two ends (poles) only marginally. The lateral surfaces feature three relatively parallel rows of small, circular depressions, with the intervening spaces densely covered by short projections. The teardrop-shaped micropylar plate measures 1.5 to 1.7 millimetres (0.059 to 0.067 in) in length and extends over less than half the total length of the egg and is situated primarily in the posterior half. It is scarcely wider than the micropyle itself, which is located in the posterior third of the capsule. Upon contact with moisture or in a humid environment, the so-called pinnae (Latin for "fin" or "wing") - structures typical for eggs of Phyllium species - unfold. As a result, the eggs then measure 5.5 to 6.2 millimetres (0.22 to 0.24 in) in length and 3.5 to 3.7 millimetres (0.14 to 0.15 in) in height (width in lateral view). In lateral view, both the anterior and posterior margins are lined with a row of long, feathery, branched pinnae. The ones on the anterior margin encircle the lid (operculum). The dorsal margin also displays pinnae in lateral view, though these are found along little more than the posterior half of the capsule's length and are only about half as long as those on the posterior and anterior margins.

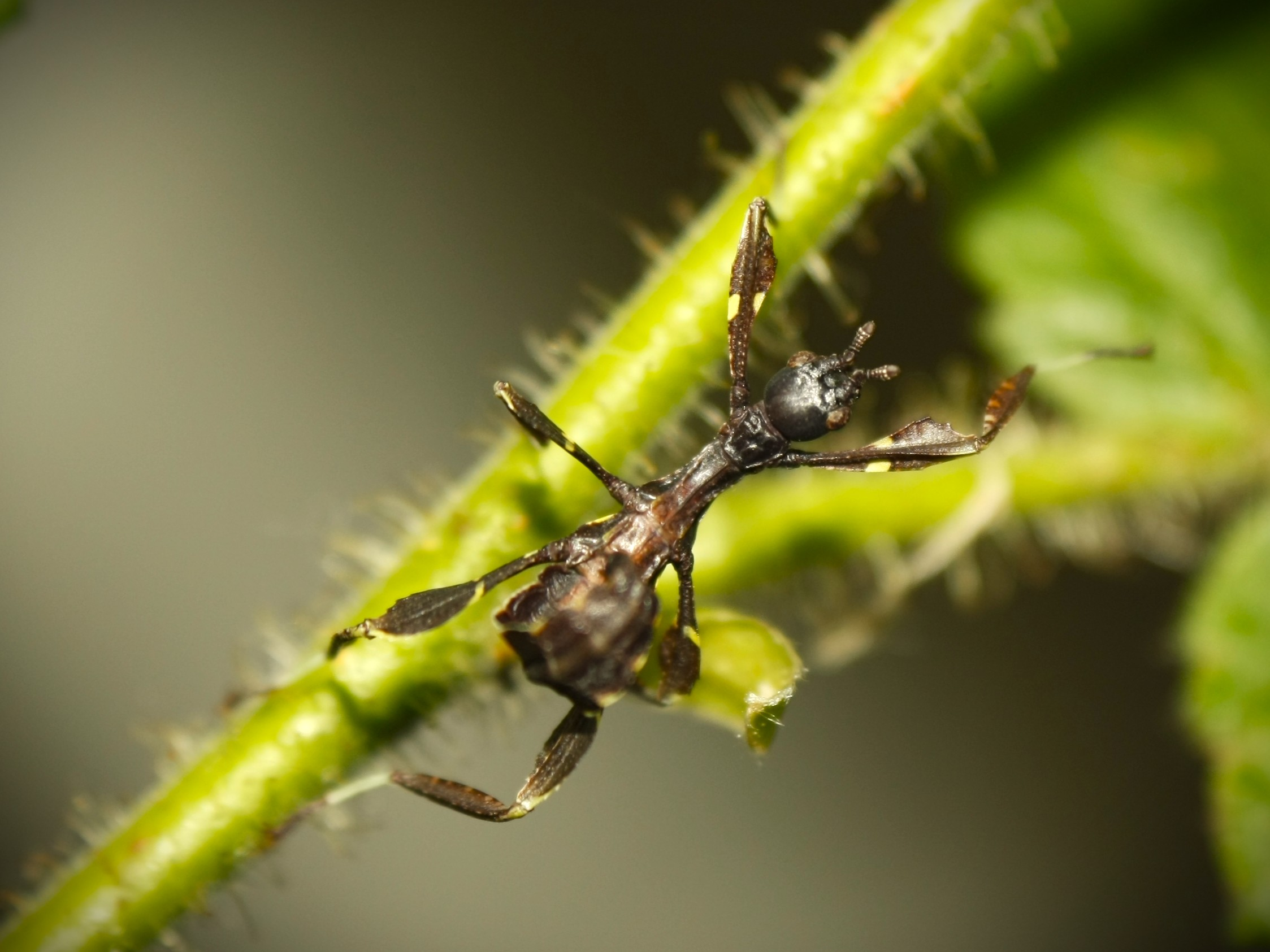
Even hatched nymph

=== Freshly hatched nymphs ===
Upon hatching, the nymphs measure approximately 14 millimetres (0.55 in) in length and display light, greenish-yellow areas against a dark brown background color. These areas are found on the legs and, very faintly, along the edges of the abdomen. Specifically, the first, elongated segment of each foot (tarsus) is entirely light-colored, while the second segment is light-colored only in part. The femoral lobes - particularly those on the middle and hind legs - also feature light to slightly greenish margins at their distal ends (i.e., near the joints). Even more conspicuous than these markings are the similarly colored bands that extend from the inner to the outer femoral lobes but skip the shaft of the femur itself. On the forelegs, these bands are located roughly midway along the femur, whereas on the middle and hind legs, they are positioned more proximally, appearing after just the first third of the femur's length. The inner tibial lobes exhibit an orange-brown spotted pattern along their edges. On the inner lobes of the forelegs, this pattern extends into a striped design.

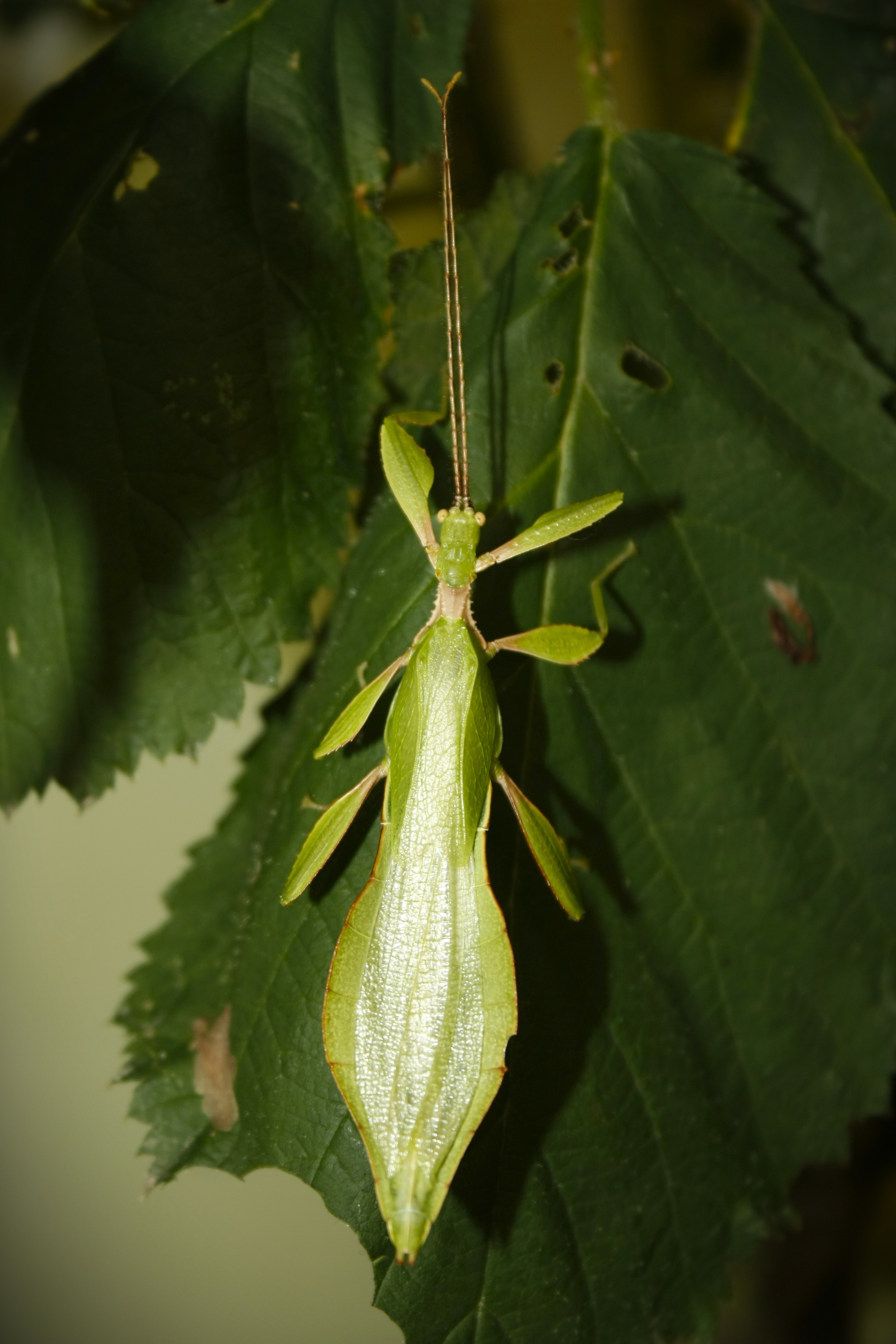
Male

=== Lifestyle and Reproduction ===
In their natural habitat, these insects have been observed feeding during the day on Psidium - specifically guava (Psidium guajava) - and mango (Mangifera indica). Adult females lay approximately ten eggs per week, flicking them away with a rapid movement of the abdomen. At temperatures between 20 and 24 °C (68 and 75 °F), the first nymphs hatch after four to five months. As with many Phyllium species, hatching occurs not at night but after daybreak, typically around midday. Upon hatching, the nymphs are dark brown - a characteristic typical of the genus - but turn green once they begin feeding. From approximately the third instar onwards, older female nymphs increasingly display their adult coloration, turning yellow, brown, or greenish-brown, or remaining green like the males. Males reach adulthood after about four to five months, and females after about five to six months.

== Distribution ==
Initially, the species' known distribution was limited to Peleng Island - part of the Banggai Islands located east of Sulawesi. All type material of the species originated there. It was later discovered that Phyllium letiranti also occurs on Taliabu Island, situated even further to the east. In addition to Taliabu - the largest and westernmost of the Sula Islands - the species is also found on Sanana Island. The species occurs as well on Mangole, an island east of Taliabu and north of Sanana. Thus, Phyllium letiranti is found west of the Weber Line; however, like other stick insect species with this distribution, it appears to have a stronger biogeographical affinity with the Moluccas to the east than with Sulawesi. On the other hand, the possibility that Phyllium letiranti also occurs on the east coast of Sulawesi cannot be ruled out. Photographs from that region - specifically from the eastern peninsula of Central Sulawesi Province - show specimens that cannot be definitively identified but appear to be either Phyllium letiranti or the similar Phyllium mamasaense, a species described from Sulawesi. Its presence on other islands in the Banggai and Sula island groups is also considered likely.

== Taxonomy ==
Royce T. Cumming and Sierra N. Teemsma described the species in 2018 as Phyllium (Phyllium) letiranti. The specific name was chosen in honor of Stéphane Le Tirant, the then-curator of the Montreal Insectarium and a good friend of the authors. As a passionate entomologist, Le Tirant worked with many different insect groups over the years but always maintained a special fondness for the Phylliidae. The female holotype and four paratypes are deposited at that same insectarium in Montreal. The total of 19 females, 6 males, and 14 eggs designated as paratypes were also distributed among the collections of the San Diego Natural History Museum, the type collection of the California Academy of Sciences, and the collection of the Senckenberg German Entomological Institute in Müncheberg, as well as the private collections of Cumming, Teemsma, Le Tirant, and Frank H. Hennemann. With the exception of one male found in April 2017, all specimens were collected between December 2016 and January 2017. All type material was collected near the village of Luk Sagu in the Kecamatan of Tinagkung Utara in the northeast of Peleng Island. Specimens likely belonging to this species had already been deposited in collections under other names. For instance, a female collected by H. Kühn on the Banggai Islands in 1885 and deposited at the Museum für Naturkunde Berlin is likely Phyllium letiranti. Although labeled as Phyllium siccifolium by Carl Brunner von Wattenwyl, it closely matches the slender Phyllium letiranti females from Peleng. A female from Taliabu Island illustrated by H. Klante - currently held in the collection of the Naturalis Biodiversity Center in Leiden - also likely belongs to Phyllium letiranti. The same applies to a male from the island of Sanana in the Hennemann collection.

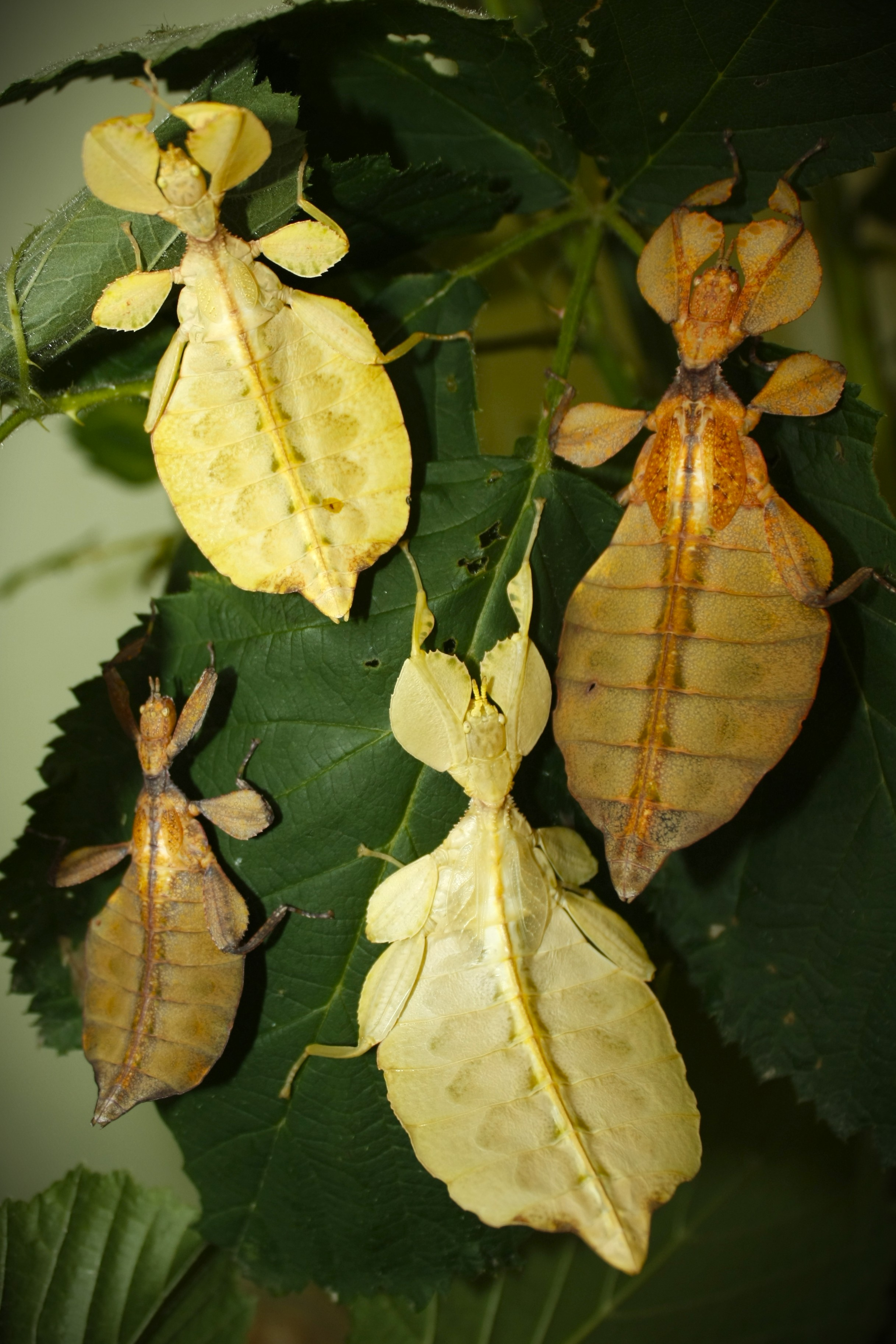
Differently colored female nymphs

A molecular genetic study published in 2021 by Sarah Bank et al., aimed at clarifying the phylogeny and historical biogeography of leaf insects, revealed not only the relationships between the relevant genera but also the interrelationships of the species themselves. Phyllium letiranti - from whose holotype the sample for the analysis was taken - initially appeared to be the sister species of Phyllium mamasaense. A subsequent, more extensive study incorporated additional samples from two paratypes of the species, as well as a sample from the holotype of Phyllium hennemanni, a species described in the interim. In this analysis, Phyllium letiranti emerged as the sister species to a clade comprising Phyllium mamasaense and Phyllium hennemanni, both of which originate from Sulawesi. Within the genus Phyllium, these two species and Phyllium letiranti - together with Phyllium siccifolium (represented by a sample from Seram Island) - form a distinct, well-defined clade (see also cladogram of genus Phyllium).

== Terraristics ==
Since its discovery, this species has been bred in the terrariums of European enthusiasts. The first eggs were already in circulation by 2018. The origin of the captive-bred strain is the village of Tataba on the west coast of Peleng - distinct from the species' type locality in the island's northeast. Consequently, the captive strain is designated as Phyllium letiranti 'Tataba' or simply Phyllium letiranti 'Peleng'. It is considered very easy to keep and breed. For this reason, and because the species is considered highly attractive due to the color variability of the females, it is widely kept by enthusiasts. Females can be green, greenish-brown, brown, yellow, or orange. The species is less prone to mutual predation (cannibalism) than other Phylliidae species. It is easily fed on raspberry and bramble leaves, as well as salal (Gaultheria shallon).
