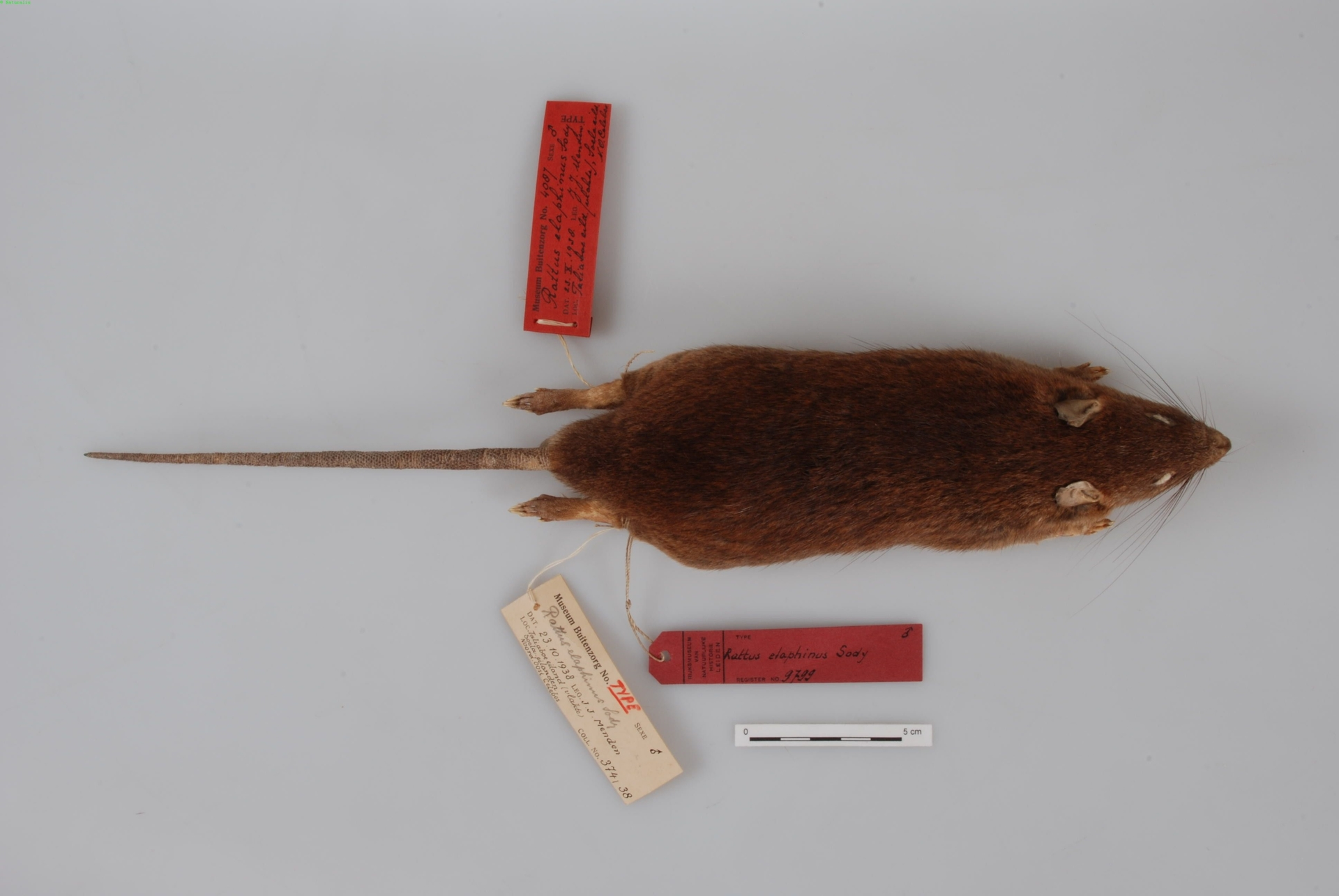
- A tagged specimen of Rattus elaphinus

Conservation status
- Near Threatened (IUCN 3.1)

Scientific classification
- Kingdom: Animalia
- Phylum: Chordata
- Class: Mammalia
- Order: Rodentia
- Family: Muridae
- Genus: Rattus
- Species: R. elaphinus

Binomial name
- Rattus elaphinus Sody, 1941

= Sula rat =

Species of rodent

The Sula rat (Rattus elaphinus) is a species of rodent in the family Muridae. It is found only in Indonesia, on Taliabu and Mangole islands in the Sula Archipelago. On Sanana island, only the introduced Rattus tanezumi and Rattus exulans are found.
