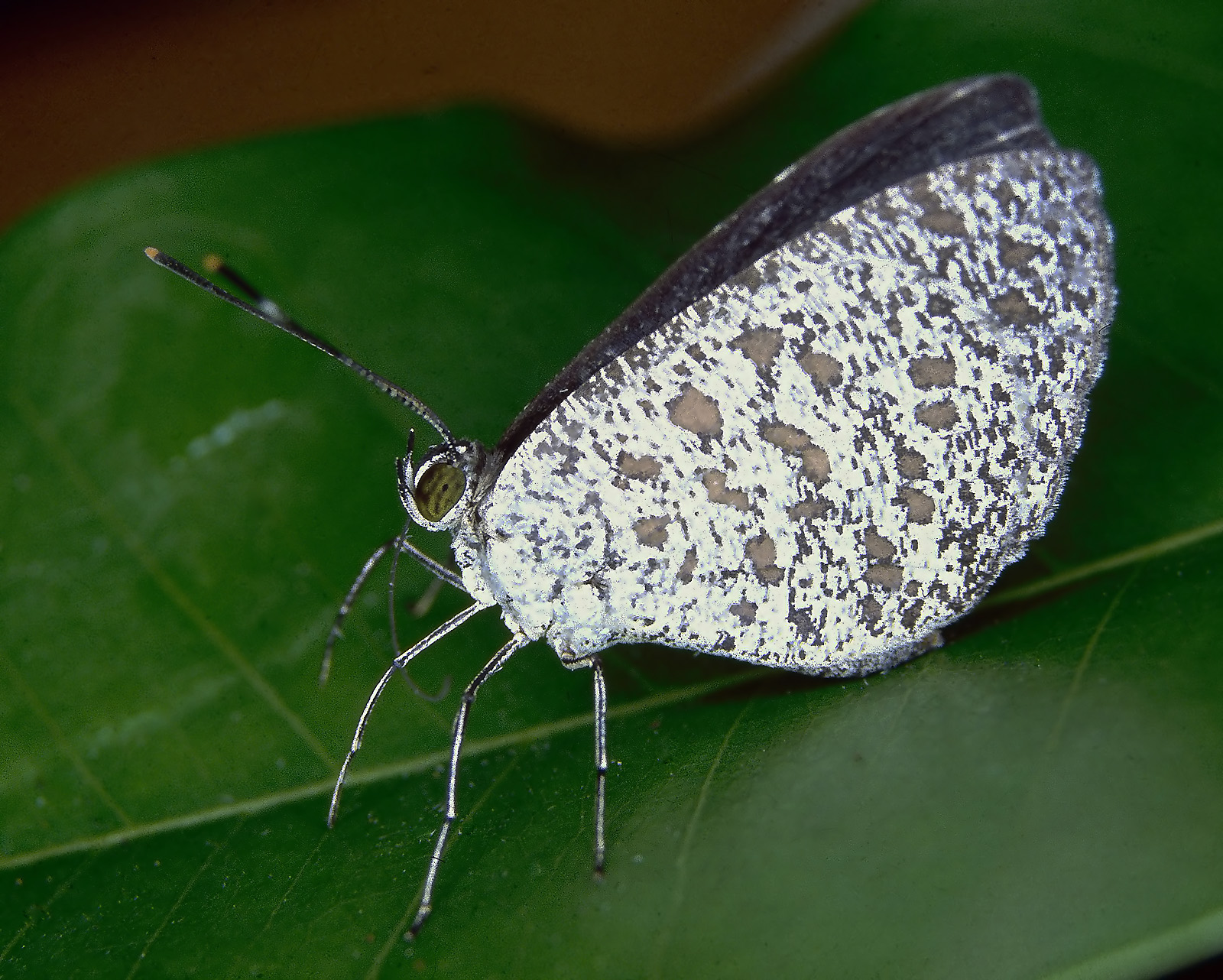
- Male in Sulawesi

Scientific classification
- Kingdom: Animalia
- Phylum: Arthropoda
- Class: Insecta
- Order: Lepidoptera
- Family: Lycaenidae
- Genus: Allotinus
- Species: A. major

Binomial name
- Allotinus major (Felder & Felder, 1865)

= Allotinus major =

Major darkie

Species of butterfly

Allotinus major, the major darkie, is a small butterfly found in Sulawesi that belongs to the lycaenids or blues family.

== Range ==
This species resides in Sulawesi, Sangihe, Banggai (Peleng) and Sula (Mangole).

== Taxonomy ==
Along with Allotinus maximus this species forms the major group of Allotinus, which is restricted to the Sulawesi region.

== Gallery ==
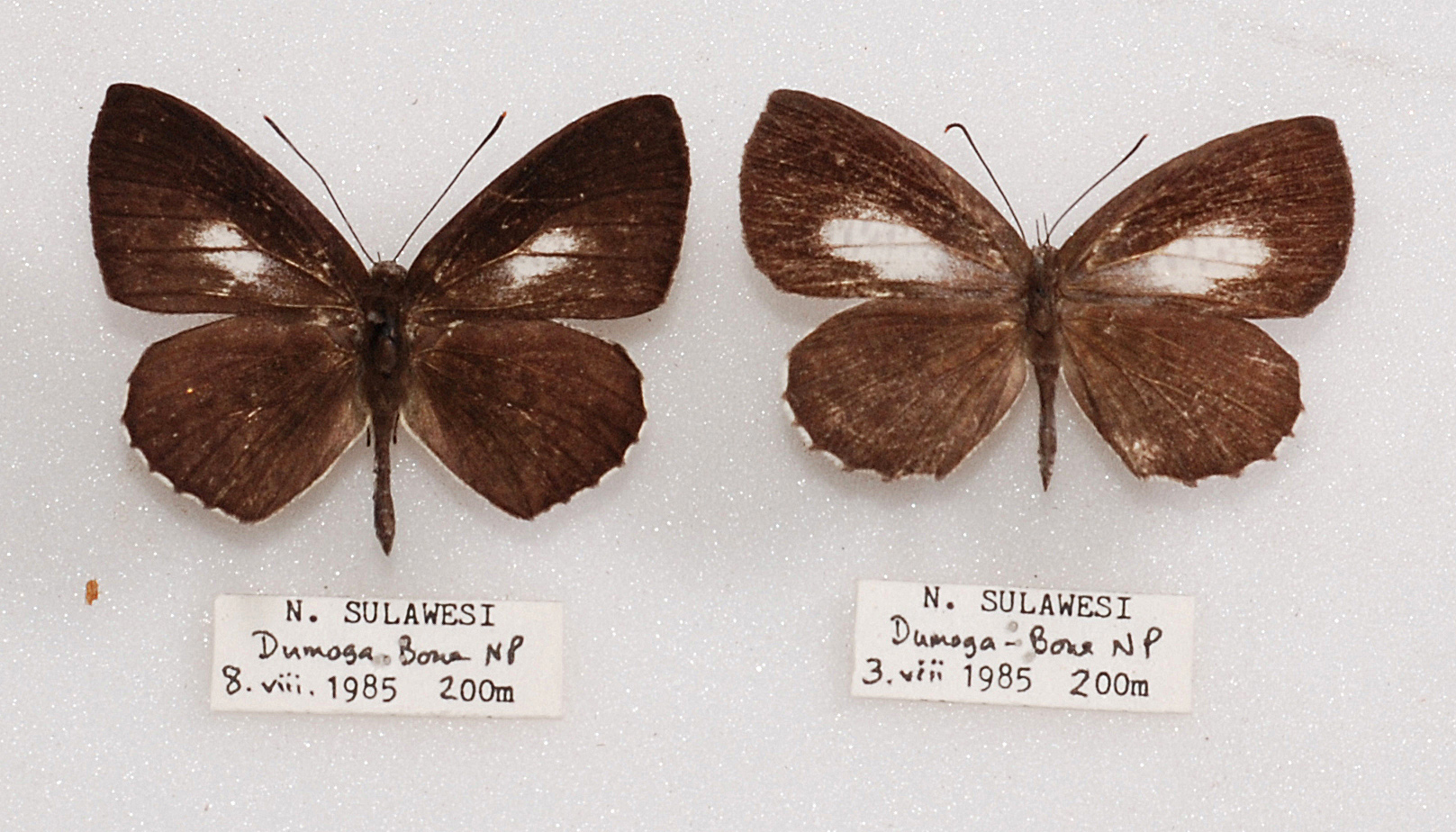
Upperside, male (left) and female, northern Sulawesi

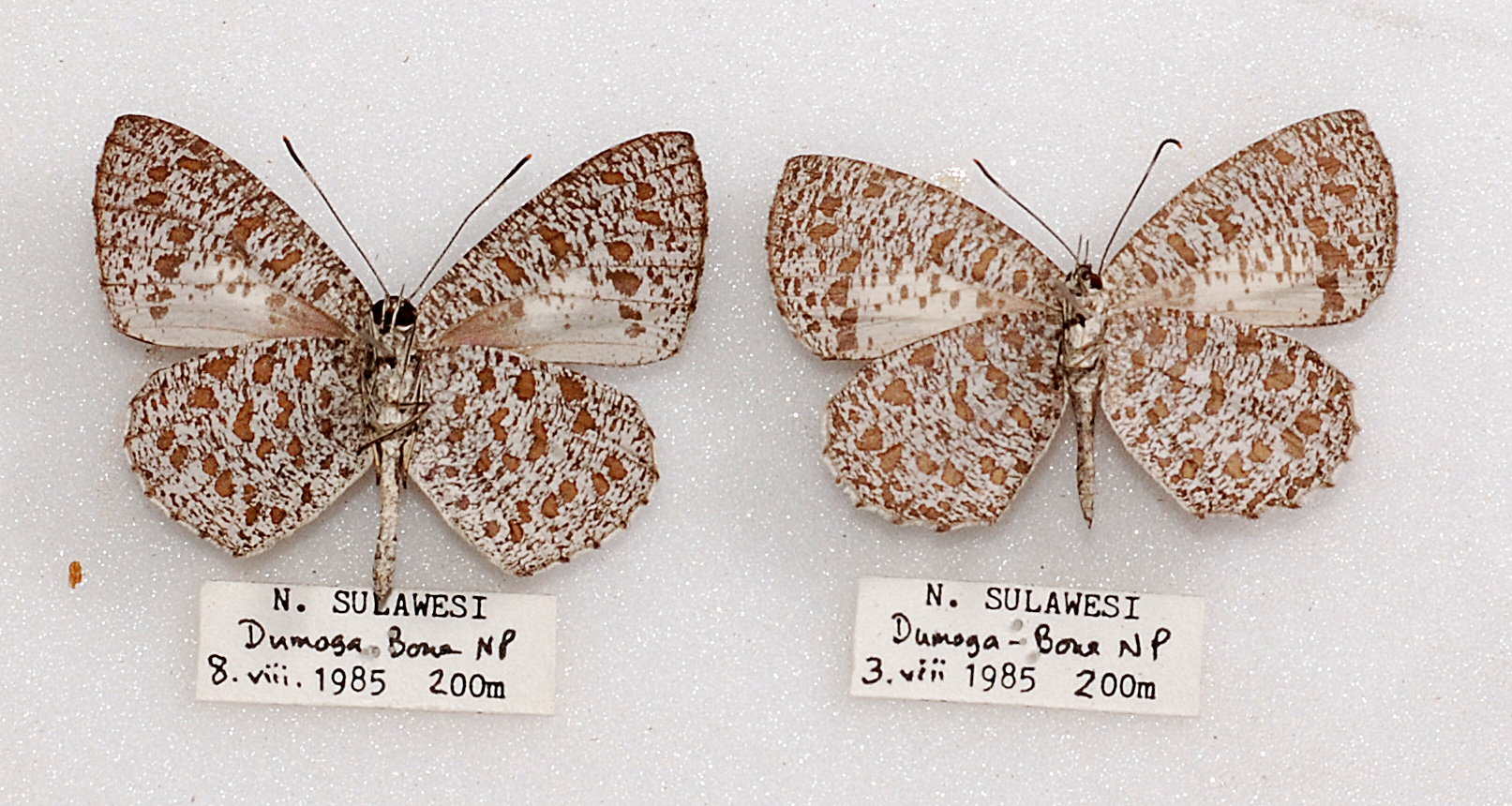
Upperside, male (left) and female, northern Sulawesi
