= List of incumbent regional heads and deputy regional heads in North Maluku =

The following is an article about the list of Regional Heads and Deputy Regional Heads in 10 regencies/cities in North Maluku who are currently still serving.

== List ==
Regency/ City	Photo of the Regent/ Mayor	Regent/ Mayor	Photo of Deputy Regent/ Mayor	Deputy Regent/ Mayor	Taking Office	End of Office (Planned)	Ref.
West Halmahera; Regency List of Regents/Deputy Regents		James Uang		Djufri Muhamad	20 February 2025	20 February 2030	
South Halmahera; Regency List of Regents/Deputy Regents		Hasan Ali Bassam Kasuba		Helmi Umar Muchsin	20 February 2025	20 February 2030	
Central Halmahera; Regency List of Regents/Deputy Regents		Ikram Malan Sangadji		Ahlan Djumadil	20 February 2025	20 February 2030	
East Halmahera; Regency List of Regents/Deputy Regents		Ubaid Yakub		Anjas Taher	20 February 2025	20 February 2030	
North Halmahera; Regency List of Regents/Deputy Regents		Piet Hein Babua		Kasman Hi. Ahmad	21 March 2025	21 March 2030	
Sula Islands; Regency List of Regents/Deputy Regents		Fifian Adeningsi Mus		Saleh Marasabessy	20 February 2025	20 February 2030	
Morotai Island; Regency List of Regents/Deputy Regents		Rusli Sibua		Rio Christian Pawane	20 February 2025	20 February 2030	
Taliabu Island; Regency List of Regents/Deputy Regents		Sashabila Mus		La Ode Yasir	26 May 2025	26 May 2030	
Ternate; City List of Mayors/Deputy mayors		Tauhid Soleman		Nasri Abubakar	20 February 2025	20 February 2030	
Tidore Islands; City List of Mayors/Deputy mayors		Muhammad Senin		Ahmad Laiman	20 February 2025	20 February 2030	

Notes

- "Commencement of office" is the inauguration date at the beginning or during the current term of office. For acting regents/mayors, it is the date of appointment or extension as acting regent/mayor.
- Based on the Constitutional Court decision Number 27/PUU-XXII/2024, the Governor and Deputy Governor, Regent and Deputy Regent, and Mayor and Deputy Mayor elected in 2020 shall serve until the inauguration of the Governor and Deputy Governor, Regent and Deputy Regent, and Mayor and Deputy Mayor elected in the 2024 national simultaneous elections as long as the term of office does not exceed 5 (five) years.

== See also ==
- North Maluku
