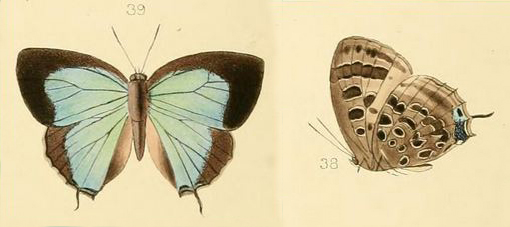
- Arhopala ocrida male, from original description

Scientific classification
- Kingdom: Animalia
- Phylum: Arthropoda
- Clade: Pancrustacea
- Class: Insecta
- Order: Lepidoptera
- Family: Lycaenidae
- Genus: Arhopala
- Species: A. ocrida

Binomial name
- Arhopala ocrida (Hewitson, 1869)

= Arhopala ocrida =

Species of butterfly

Arhopala ocrida, is a butterfly in the family Lycaenidae. It was described by William Chapman Hewitson in 1869. It is found in the Indomalayan realm where it is endemic to the Philippines. Subspecies A. ocrida cionnii is described from the Sula Islands.

== Description ==
A. ocrida Hew. (150 B e) is at once discernible by the very intensely glossy green upper surface, where the black marginal band of the hindwing is very broad at the apex and tapers off analwards, almost ending at the small tail; but according to Semper these characters are somewhat variable, so that the species sometimes resembles the exterior of corinda (150 e).
