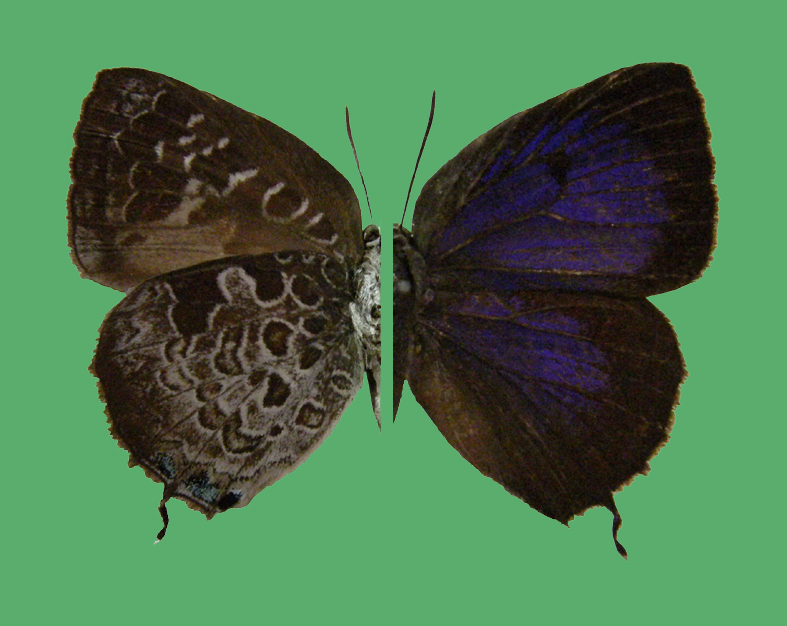
- Female upperside & underside

Scientific classification
- Kingdom: Animalia
- Phylum: Arthropoda
- Clade: Pancrustacea
- Class: Insecta
- Order: Lepidoptera
- Family: Lycaenidae
- Genus: Arhopala
- Species: A. tephlis
- Subspecies: A. t. unnoi

Trinomial name
- Arhopala tephlis unnoi H. Hayashi, 1976

= Arhopala tephlis unnoi =

Subspecies of butterfly

Arhopala tephlis unnoi is a subspecies of the butterfly Arhopala tephlis in the family Lycaenidae. The subspecies was first described by Hisakazu Hayashi in 1976. It was found on Palawan in the Philippines. This subspecies is distributed on Batanes, Bohol, Calamian, Cebu, Cmiguin de Luzon, Leyte, Luzon, Mindanao, Samar, Sibuyan except Palawan.

Etymology. The subspecific name is dedicated to Mr. Kazutaka UNNO, professor emeritus of Osaka University.

== Additional sources ==
- Hayashi, Hisakazu, 1976: SOME LYCAENID BUTTERFLIES FROM PALAWAN, WITH THE DESCRIPTIONS OF NEW SUBSPECIES (LEPIDOPTERS : LYCAENIDAE) TYO TO GA.27:5-8.
- Treadaway, Colin G., 1995: Checklist of the butterflies of the Philippine Islands. Nachrichten des Entomologischen Vereins Apollo, Suppl. 14: 7–118.
- Takanami, Yusuke & Seki, Yasuo (April 1, 2001). "Edition 12". A Synonymic List of Lycaenidae from the Philippines. Archived from the original on June 14, 2001 – via Internet Archive.
- Treadaway, Colin G. & Schröder, Heinz G., 2012: Revised checklist of the butterflies of the Philippine Islands (Lepidoptera: Rhopalocera). Nachrichten des Entomologischen Vereins Apollo, Suppl. 20: 1-64.
