= Scopula destituta =

Scientific classification
- Kingdom: Animalia
- Phylum: Arthropoda
- Class: Insecta
- Order: Lepidoptera
- Family: Geometridae
- Genus: Scopula
- Species: S. destituta

Binomial name
- Scopula destituta (Walker, 1866)

Synonyms
- Acidalia destituta Walker, 1866; Craspedia cretata Warren, 1900

Species of geometer moth in subfamily Sterrhinae

Scopula destituta is a moth of the family Geometridae. It is found on the Sula Islands.
