= Sula Islands Regency =

Regency in North Maluku, Indonesia

Sula Islands Regency Kabupaten Kepulauan Sula
- Regency
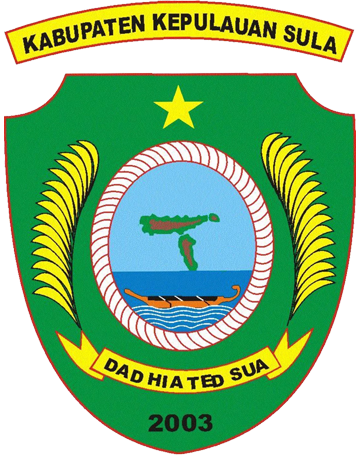
- Coat of arms
- Motto: Dad Hia Ted Sula (Unite to Raise Sula)
- Location within North Maluku

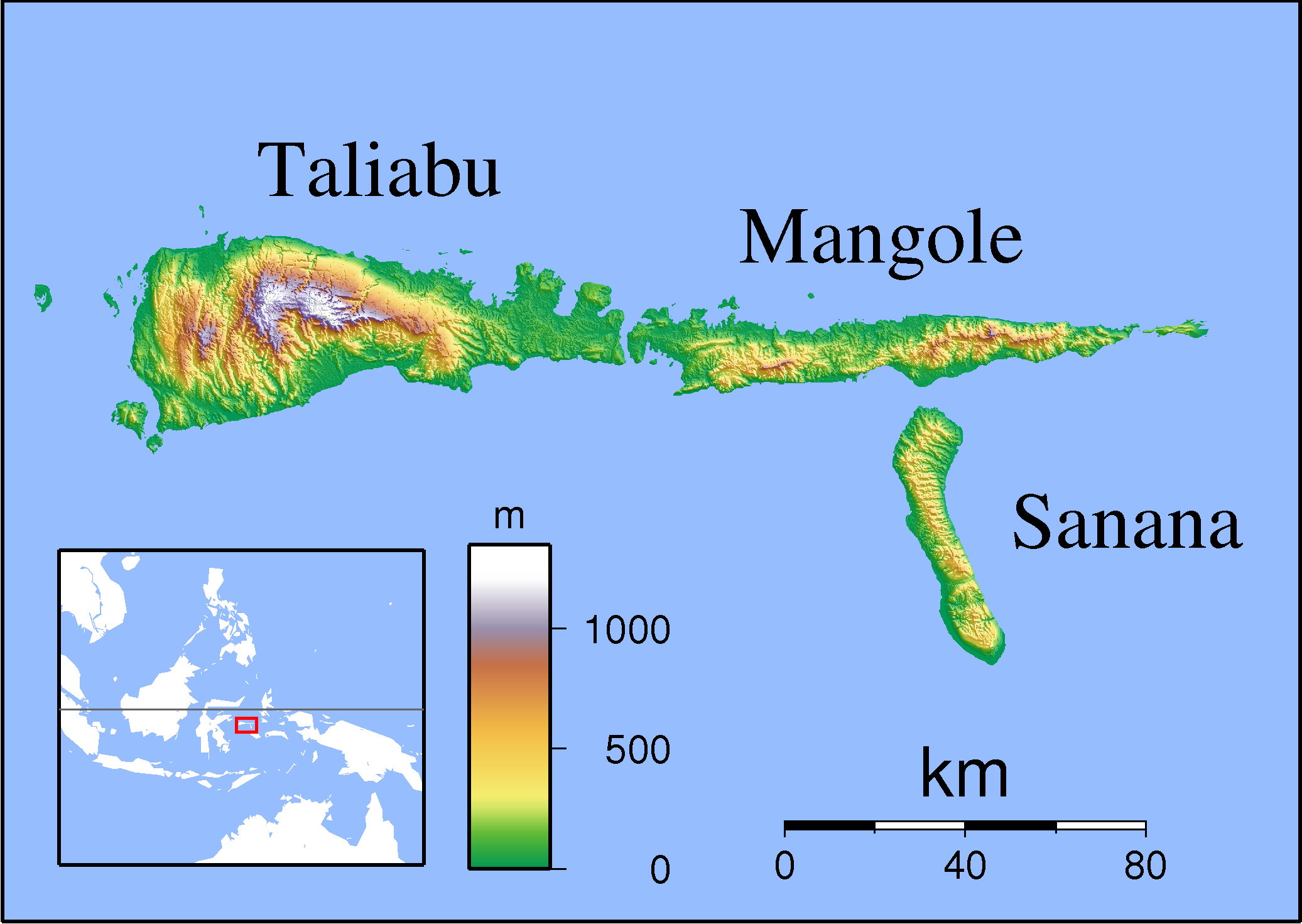
- Location in Sula Islands and Indonesia Sula Islands Regency (Indonesia)
- Coordinates: 1°52′S 125°22′E
- Country: Indonesia
- Province: North Maluku
- Capital: Sanana

Government
  - Regent: Fifian Adeningsih Mus
  - Vice Regent: Muhammad Saleh Marasabessy

Area
  - Total: 1,779.81 km^{2} (687.19 sq mi)

Population (mid 2024 estimate)
  - Total: 105,095
  - Density: 59.0484/km^{2} (152.935/sq mi)
- Time zone: UTC+9 (IEST)
- Area code: (+62) 921
- Website: kepulauansulakab.go.id

The Sula Islands Regency (Indonesian: Kabupaten Kepulauan Sula) is one of the regencies in North Maluku province of Indonesia. It was originally formed on 25 February 2003, when it encompassed the three large islands comprising the Sula Archipelago, together with minor adjacent islands. However, the largest and most westerly of the three, Taliabu, was split off from the Sula Islands Regency on 14 December 2012 to form a separate regency.

The remaining two islands which now comprise the Regency are Sulabesi (formerly Sanana) and Mangole (formerly Mangon or Mangoli). The residual regency covers a land area of 1,779.81 km^{2} and had a population of 85,215 at the 2010 Census and 104,082 at the 2020 Census; the official estimate as of mid-2024 was 105,095 (comprising 52,697 males and 52,398 females). The administrative capital is at the town of Sanana on the north part of the east coast of Sulabesi Island.

== History ==
The Dutch built a fort on Sanana in 1652. Wallace visited the islands during an ornithological expedition in 1862.

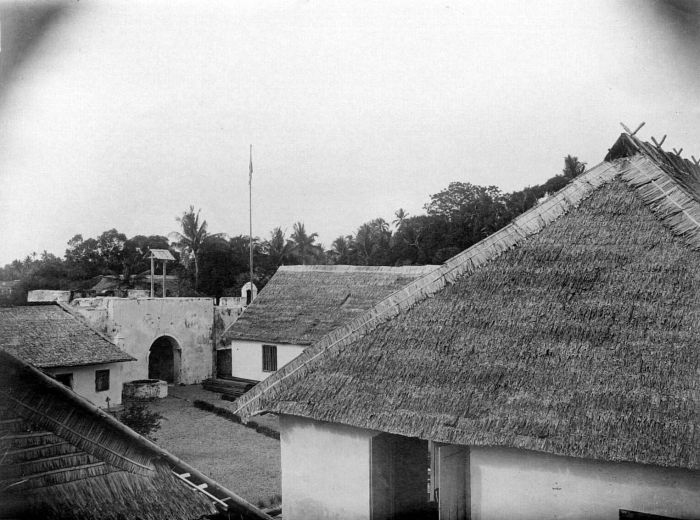
The Dutch era Fort De Verwachting in Sanana town as it looked in 1921

Before Indonesian independence, the Sula Islands were also known as the Xulla Islands, with Taliabo as Xulla Taliabo, Sulabesi (originally Sanana Island) as Xulla Bessi, and Mangoli as Xulla Mangola.

== Administration ==
Sula Islands Regency comprises twelve districts (kecamatan), tabulated below with their areas and populations at the 2010 Census and the 2020 Census, together with the official estimates as of mid-2024. The table also includes the locations of the district administrative centres, the number of administrative villages (all classed as rural desa) in each district, and its post code.

Kode Wilayah	Name of District (kecamatan)	English name	Area in km^{2}	Pop'n Census 2010	Pop'n Census 2020	Pop'n Estimate mid 2024	Admin centre	No. of villages	Post code
82.05.03	Sulabesi Barat	West Sulabesi	93.45	4,707	5,585	5,834	Kabau Pantai	6	97797
82.05.09	Sulabesi Selatan	South Sulabesi	90.06	4,298	5,545	5,731	Fuata	5	97798
82.05.02	Sanana		116.70	25,183	33,994	32,436	Fogi	11	97795
82.05.07	Sulabesi Tengah	Central Sulabesi	75.74	5,929	7,250	7,427	Waiboga	6	97799
82.05.08	Sulabesi Timur	East Sulabesi	81.84	3,100	4,350	4,444	Balleha	6	97795
82.05.18	Sanana Utara	North Sanana	77.06	5,675	7,622	8,307	Pohea	7	97796
	Sulabesi Island	(total)	534.85	48,892	64,346	64,179		41	
82.05.01	Mangoli Timur	East Mangoli	206.08	4,301	5,613	5,347	Waitina	5	97793
82.05.11	Mangoli Tengah	Central Mangoli	250.42	6,381	7,644	8,085	Mangoli	9	97793
82.05.10	Mangoli Utara Timur	Northeast Mangoli	159.80	3,777	4,735	4,744	Waisakai	4	97793
82.05.06	Mangoli Barat ^{(a)}	West Mangoli	152.87	7,084	7,198	7,933	Dofa	7	97793
82.05.13	Mangoli Utara	North Mangoli	259.77	10,115	9,373	9,305	Falabisahaya	7	97793
82.05.12	Mangoli Selatan	South Mangoli	216.02	4,665	5,173	5,502	Buya	5	
	Mangole Island	(total)	1,244.96	36,323	39,736	40,916		37	

Note: (a) including offshore islands of Pulau Dodoku and Pulau Mancaril.

== Economy ==
According to government data, Sula Islands Regency's food crops include vegetables, groundnuts, cassava, sweet potatoes, durian, mangosteen and mango. As of 2005 the area of agriculturally active land was 24743.56 hectares with production amounting to 33,608.62 tons per year. Taliabu-Sanana District is the main producer of cloves, nutmeg, cocoa, copra and other coconut products. Fishery production is very diverse with and estimated sustainable potential of 40,273.91 tonnes per year of which only 22.8 percent is currently exploited. Forestry is considered a potential industry with the natural forest-based Classification Map TGHK RTRWP suggesting a forest area of 471,951.53 hectares, but much of this is protected or hard to access, due to steep slopes and transportation logistics, and the islands' main plywood company, PT Barito Pacific Timber Group (in Falabisahaya, West Mangoli) has closed. Industrial activity is very limited. There is a gold mine in East Mangoli District (at Waitina and Kawata) and coal mines are located in the peninsula of West Sulabesi District, East Taliabu and Sub Sanana (Wai Village Ipa). Reserves of coal are estimated around 10.4 million tonnes.

== Tourism ==
The Indonesian Ministry of Tourism (Kemenpar) is ready to support the promotion of tourism destination potential on Sula Islands. Demographically located between the crossroads of Wakatobi and Raja Ampat tourist areas, it is ideally developed as marine tourism and special interest tourism for diving enthusiasts.

One of the support is Maksaira Festival at Wai Ipa Beach to Bajo Village Beach. On 2018 the festival as a cultural and marine tourism attraction event has entered the third year and will be listed as MURI record breaking for the largest grouper fishing participant targeted by 3000 participants in 2018, where year 2017 followed by 1700 participants.

== Fauna ==
The following species are native to the Sula Islands:

- Buru babirusa Babyrousa babyrussa
- Banggai cuscus Strigocuscus pelengensis
- Sula rat Rattus elaphinus
- Sulawesi flying fox Acerodon celebensis
- Lesser short-nosed fruit bat Cynopterus brachyotis
- Greenish naked-backed fruit bat Dobsonia viridis
- Long-tongued nectar bat Macroglossus minimus
- Pallas's tube-nosed bat Nyctimene cephalotes
- Ashy-headed flying fox Pteropus caniceps
- Sulawesi rousette Rousettus celebensis
- Swift fruit bat Thoopterus nigrescens
- Small Asian sheath-tailed bat Emballonura alecto
- Fawn leaf-nosed bat Hipposideros cervinus
- Small bent-winged bat Miniopterus pusillus
- Sula megapode Megapodius bernsteinii (Gosong Sula), status vulnerable

Introduced species include:

- Asian house shrew
- Wild boar (Sus scrofa)
- Polynesian rat (Rattus exulans)
