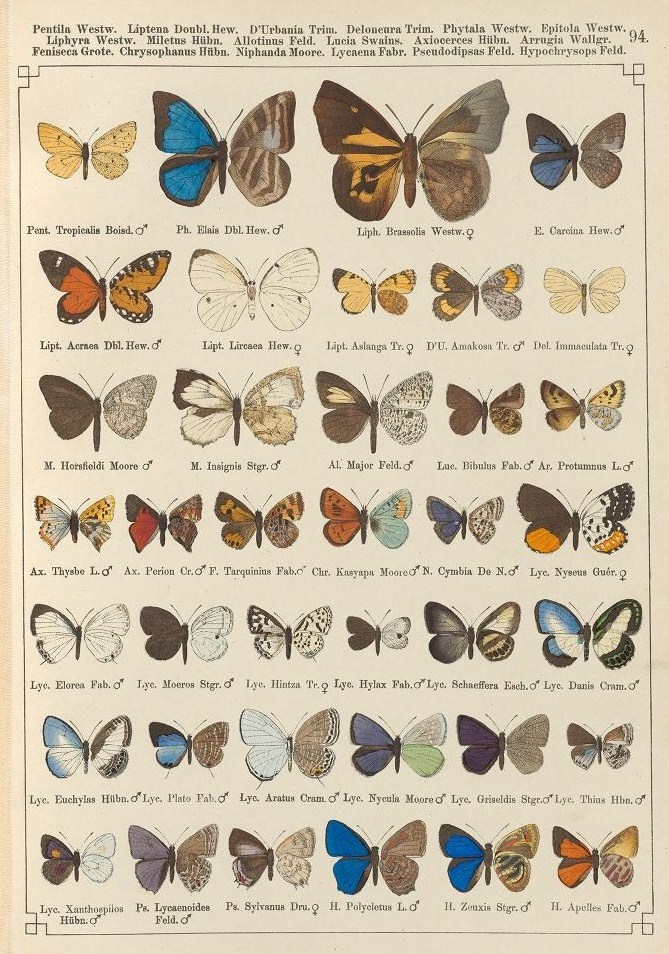
- as major in Langhans, H. W., Röber, J., Schatz, E., Staudinger, O., 1888 Exotische schmetterlinge von dr. O. Staudinger und dr. E. Schatz. V. G. Löwensohn, Fürth

Scientific classification
- Domain: Eukaryota
- Kingdom: Animalia
- Phylum: Arthropoda
- Class: Insecta
- Order: Lepidoptera
- Family: Lycaenidae
- Genus: Allotinus
- Species: A. maximus

Binomial name
- Allotinus maximus Staudinger, 1888

Synonyms
- Allotinus albatus var. maximus Staudinger, 1888

= Allotinus maximus =

Species of butterfly

Allotinus maximus is a butterfly in the family Lycaenidae. It was described by Otto Staudinger in 1888. It is found on Sulawesi.The now accepted name is Allotinus major subsp. maximus Staudinger, 1888.
