= Callulops kopsteini =

Conservation status
- Data Deficient (IUCN 3.1)

Scientific classification
- Kingdom: Animalia
- Phylum: Chordata
- Class: Amphibia
- Order: Anura
- Family: Microhylidae
- Genus: Callulops
- Species: C. kopsteini

Binomial name
- Callulops kopsteini (Mertens, 1930)
- Callulops kopsteini is only known from Sanana Island, Indonesia

Synonyms
- Hylophorbus kopsteini Mertens, 1930; Metopostira kopsteini (Mertens, 1930); Phrynomantis kopsteini (Mertens, 1930)

Species of frog

Callulops kopsteini is a species of frog in the family Microhylidae. The species is endemic to Sanana Island, Indonesia.

== Etymology ==
The specific name kopsteini honours Felix Kopstein, Austrian physician and naturalist who collected the type series in 1924. The common name Kopstein's callulops frog has been coined for this species.

== Description ==
The type series of C. kopsteini consists of two adult males measuring in snout-to-vent length (SVL) 41–42 mm (1.6–1.7 in) and an adult female measuring 45 mm (1.8 in) SVL. The overall appearance is stocky. The head is somewhat wider than it is long. The snout is rounded but slightly protruding. The tympanum is distinct. The finger and toe tips bear small discs; webbing is absent. The skin is smooth. The upper parts are dark brown. There are two eye spots; other markings are vague. The underside is dirty gray-brown, with diffuse, light gray spots.

== Habitat and conservation ==
C. kopsteini has not been recorded after it was first collected (i.e., 1924). It presumably occurs in lowland forest. Development is assumed to be direct (i.e., there is no free-living larval stage).

This species is likely to be threatened by extensive logging taking place on Sanana Island. However, there is no recent information on its status.
