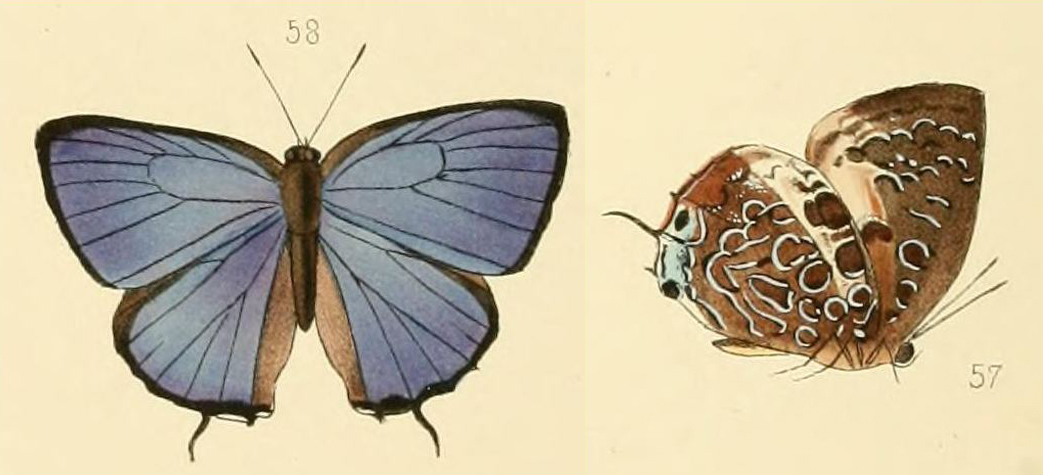

Scientific classification
- Kingdom: Animalia
- Phylum: Arthropoda
- Clade: Pancrustacea
- Class: Insecta
- Order: Lepidoptera
- Family: Lycaenidae
- Genus: Arhopala
- Species: A. tephlis

Binomial name
- Arhopala tephlis (Hewitson, 1869)

Synonyms
- Amblypodia tephlis

= Arhopala tephlis =

Species of butterfly

Arhopala tephlis is a butterfly in the family Lycaenidae. It was discovered by William Chapman Hewitson in 1869. It is found in Indonesia.

== Description ==
The male is violet blue on the upperside with the border dark-brown and narrow. The female is blackish-brown with a small bright bluish patch. The underside is rufous-brown, with the spots and bands white. The border varies from 0.5 to 2.5 millimeters.

== Subspecies ==
Four subspecies are recognized-

- Arhopala tephlis tephlis (Hewitson, 1869) - Maluku, Halmahera
- Arhopala tephlis bicolora (Röber, 1886) - Sulawesi
- Arhopala tephlis unnoi (Hayashi, 1976) - Philippines
- Arhopala tephlis mulleri (Andrews et al., 2018) - Sula Islands
