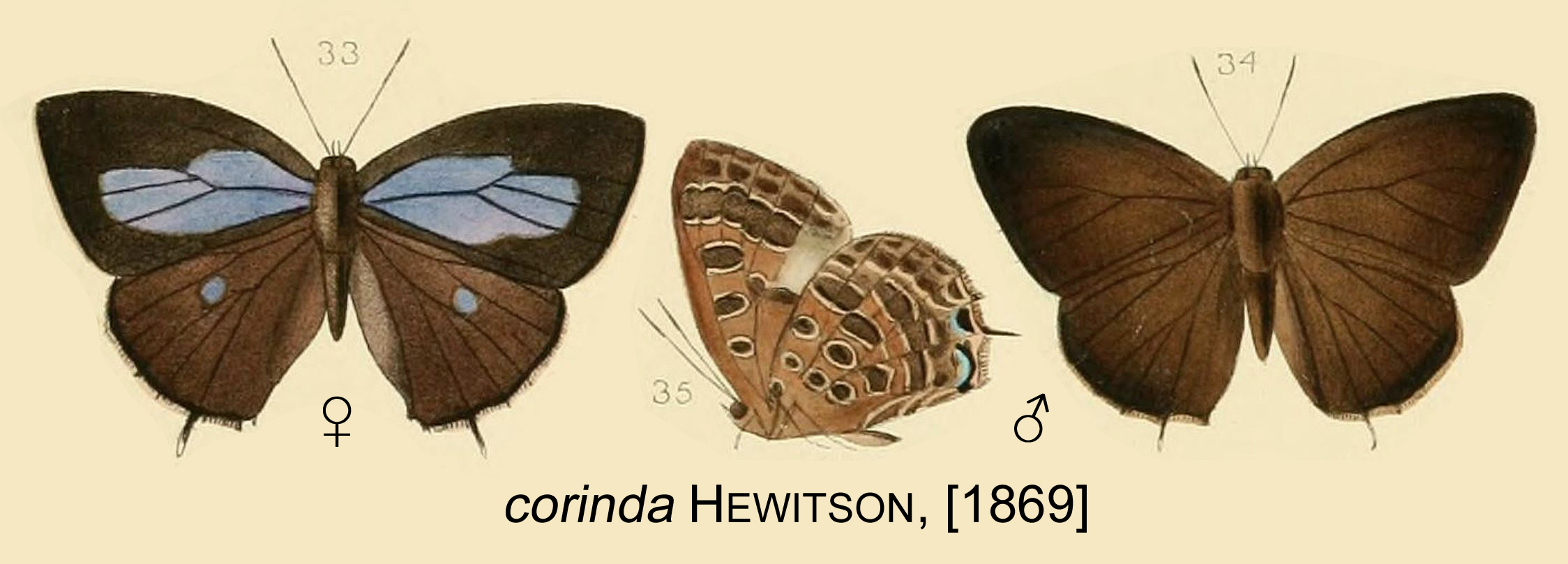

Scientific classification
- Kingdom: Animalia
- Phylum: Arthropoda
- Clade: Pancrustacea
- Class: Insecta
- Order: Lepidoptera
- Family: Lycaenidae
- Genus: Arhopala
- Species: A. corinda

Binomial name
- Arhopala corinda (Hewitson, 1869)

Synonyms
- Amblypodia corinda Hewitson, 1869; Arhopala corestes Corbet, 1941; Arhopala acestes de Nicéville, [1893]

= Arhopala corinda =

Species of butterfly

Arhopala corinda is a species of butterfly belonging to the lycaenid family described by William Chapman Hewitson in 1869. It is found in Southeast Asia (Peninsular Malaya, Sumatra, Borneo, Burma, Mergui, Langkawi and the Philippines).

== Description ==
The male is above very similar to a large male of Arhopala bazalus [nominate or ssp. turbata Butler ], but it has not the stunted apex of the forewing and also a somewhat different violet reflection which, however, is only distinct in a certain light. Beneath the spots and bands are filled with a slightly darker colour than the ground-colour, the metallic place at the anal angle of the hindwing is distinct. Female above on both wings with a bright blue proximal area into which a black spot projects at the cell-end.

== Subspecies ==
- Arhopala corinda corinda (Philippines)
- Arhopala corinda corestes Corbet, 1941 (southern Burma, Mergui, Langkawi)
- Arhopala corinda acestes de Nicéville, [1893] (Peninsular Malaysia, Sumatra, Borneo)
