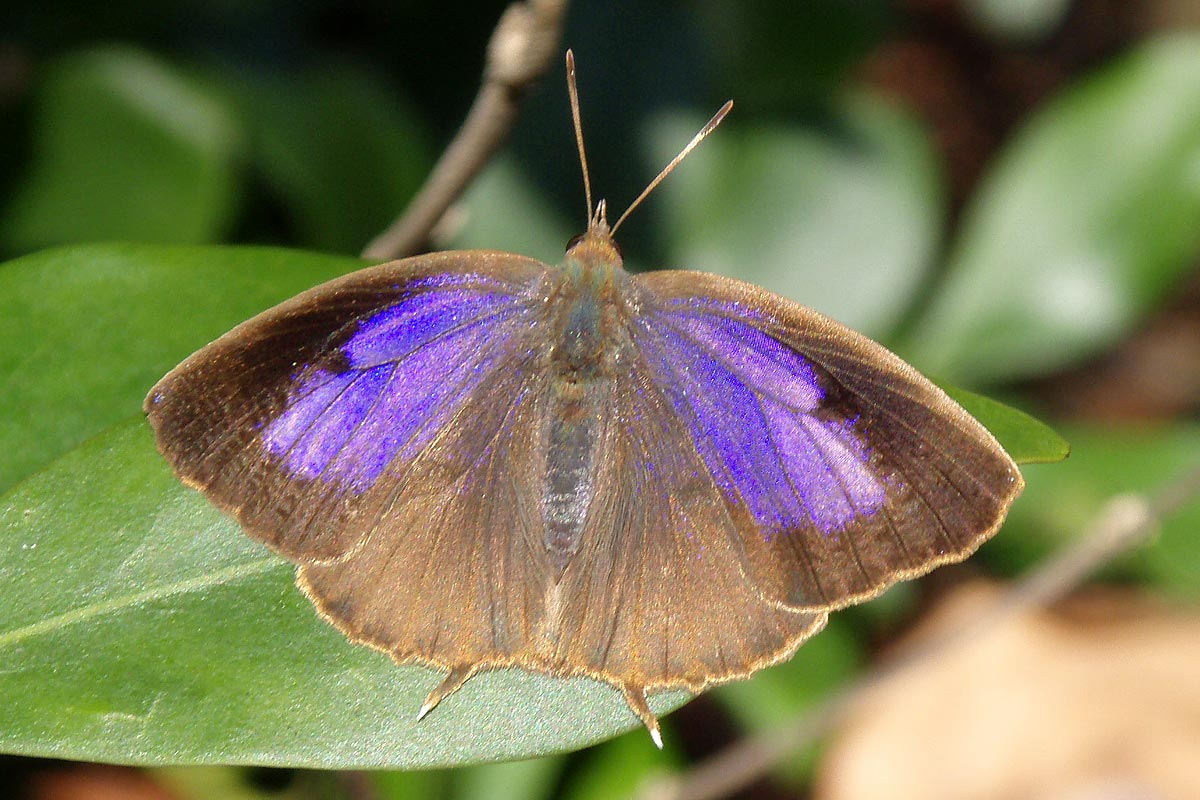

Scientific classification
- Kingdom: Animalia
- Phylum: Arthropoda
- Clade: Pancrustacea
- Class: Insecta
- Order: Lepidoptera
- Family: Lycaenidae
- Genus: Arhopala
- Species: A. bazalus

Binomial name
- Arhopala bazalus (Hewitson, 1852)

Synonyms
- Amblypodia bazalus Hewitson, 1862; Narathura bazalus (Hewitson, 1862)

= Arhopala bazalus =

Powdered oakblue

Species of butterfly

Arhopala bazalus, the powdered oakblue, is a lycaenid or blue butterfly first described by William Chapman Hewitson in 1852. It is found in Myanmar, mainland China, India (Assam, kerala and Sikkim), Indochina, Japan, the Philippines, and Taiwan.

== Description ==
The male is almost without any blue lustre; both wings are of a dull dark brown colour, only in a certain light the upper surface exhibits a feebly bluish, somewhat silvery reflection. In the female we notice a deep violettish-blue spot in the basal portions of the wings.

== Subspecies ==
- A. b. bazalus Java, Sumatra
- A. b. turbata (Butler, 1881) Taiwan, Japan intensely deep blackish purple, border varying width.
- A. b. teesta (de Nicéville, 1886) Sikkim - W.China, Burma, Mergui, Thailand
- A. b. nebenius Fruhstorfer, 1914 Northeast Sumatra - male above similar to pratinas, mostly larger and with more blue on the upper surface; beneath less purple grey colouring.
- A. b. pratinas Fruhstorfer, 1914 West Java - smaller than the nominate, A above with a very deep dark blue gloss from which the black marginal band contrasts so little that it can only be noticed when looked upon from the side; this marginal band is much narrower. Beneath the bands of the forewing are more distinct, the bands of the hindwing broader and more coherent.
- A. b. zalinda Corbet, 1941 Peninsular Malaya, Thailand -male deep purple, female shining blue
- A. b. asagiae (Hayashi, 1978) Philippines (Mindanao)
In Tokyo, Japan

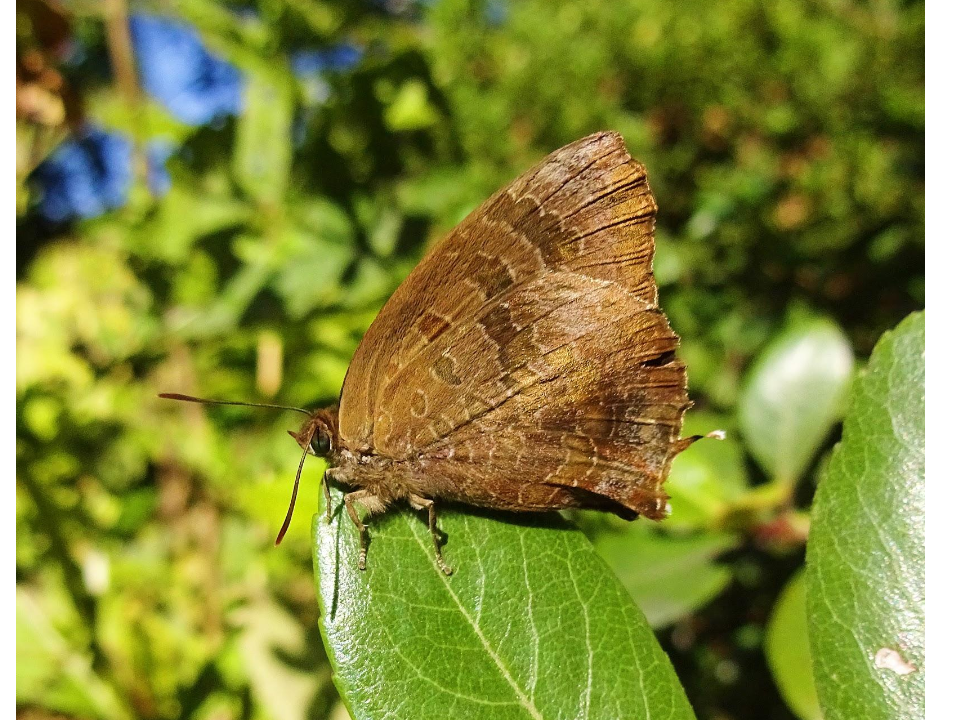
Underside of a male in Japan

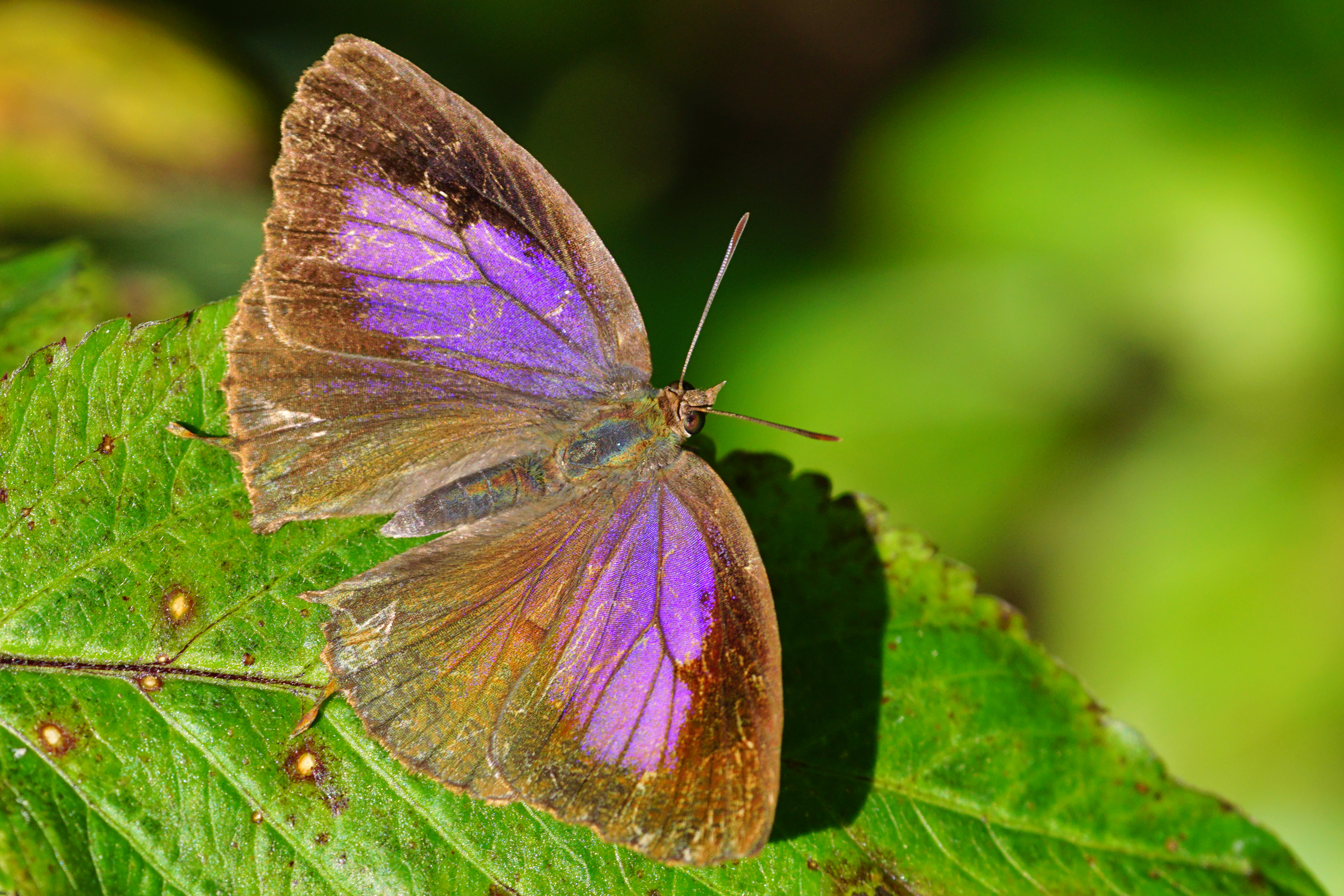
Topside of subspecies A. b. turbata in Taiwan
