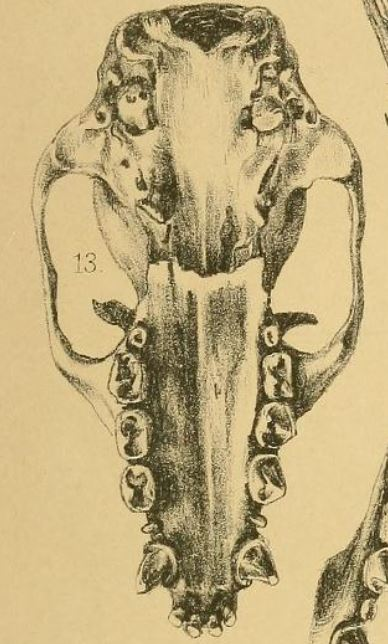

Conservation status
- Vulnerable (IUCN 3.1)

Scientific classification
- Kingdom: Animalia
- Phylum: Chordata
- Class: Mammalia
- Order: Chiroptera
- Family: Pteropodidae
- Genus: Pteropus
- Species: P. caniceps

Binomial name
- Pteropus caniceps Gray, 1870
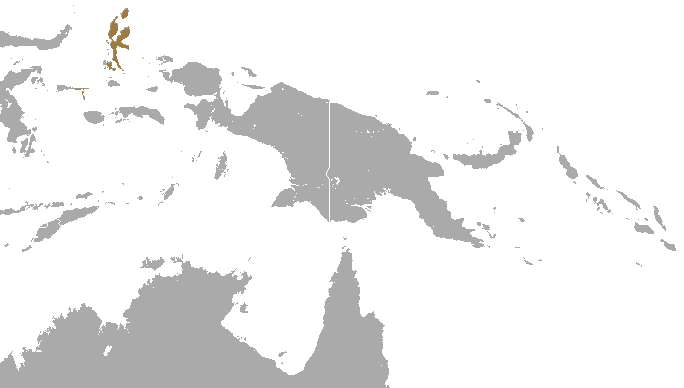
- Ashy-headed flying fox range

= Ashy-headed flying fox =

Species of bat

The ashy-headed flying fox or North Moluccan flying fox (Pteropus caniceps) is a species of bat in the family Pteropodidae. It is endemic to Indonesia.

== Taxonomy and etymology ==
It was described as a new species in 1870 by British zoologist John Edward Gray. The holotype had been collected on the Bacan Islands by Alfred Russel Wallace. Its species name "caniceps" means "gray-headed" from Latin canus (gray) and -ceps (headed). This species has two subspecies:

- P. c. caniceps
- P. c. dobsoni (named for zoologist George Edward Dobson)

== Description ==
Its forearm is 139–141 mm (5.5–5.6 in) long.

== Range and habitat ==
This species is endemic to Indonesia. It has been found at elevations up to 1,630 m (5,350 ft) above sea level.

== Conservation ==
As of 2016, it is assessed as a vulnerable species by the IUCN. It meets the criteria for this assessment because its population decline has been at least 30% from 1992–2016. Additionally, it is experiencing habitat fragmentation, and it is losing habitat due to logging and mining activities.
