= Taliabu Island Regency =

Regency in North Maluku, Indonesia

Taliabu Island Regency Kabupaten Pulau Taliabu
- Regency
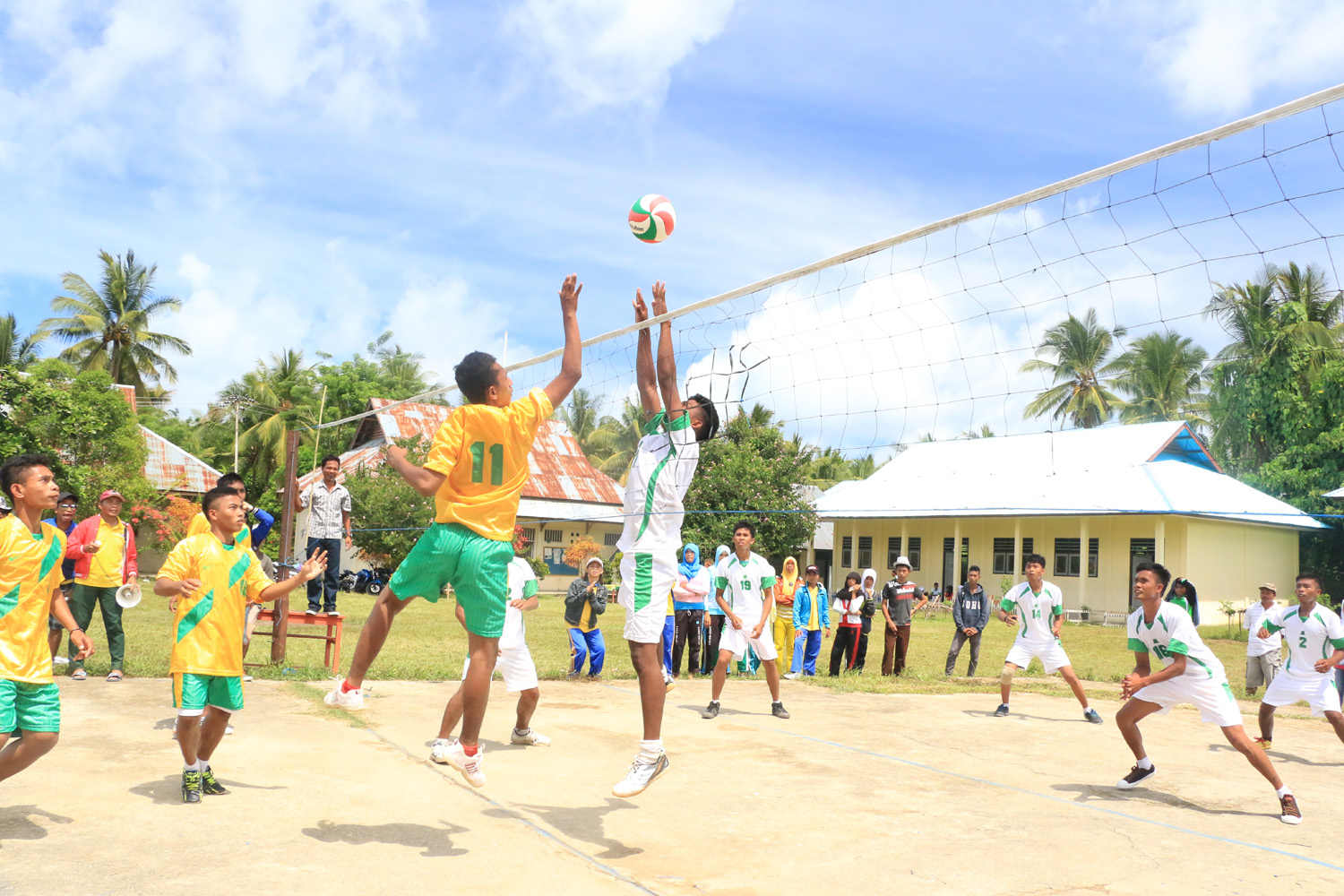
- Students seen playing volleyball at the local school

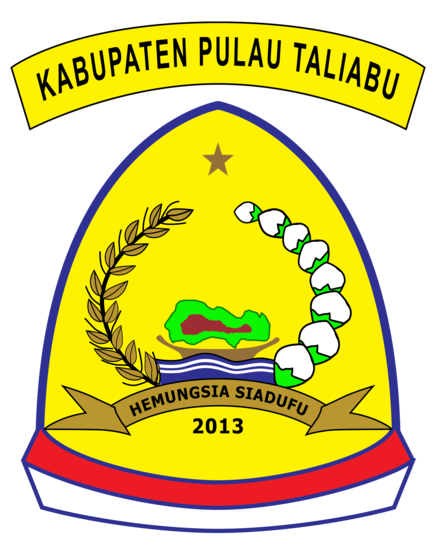
- Coat of arms
- Motto(s): Hemungsia Siadufu (Together and United)
- Location within Maluku Islands

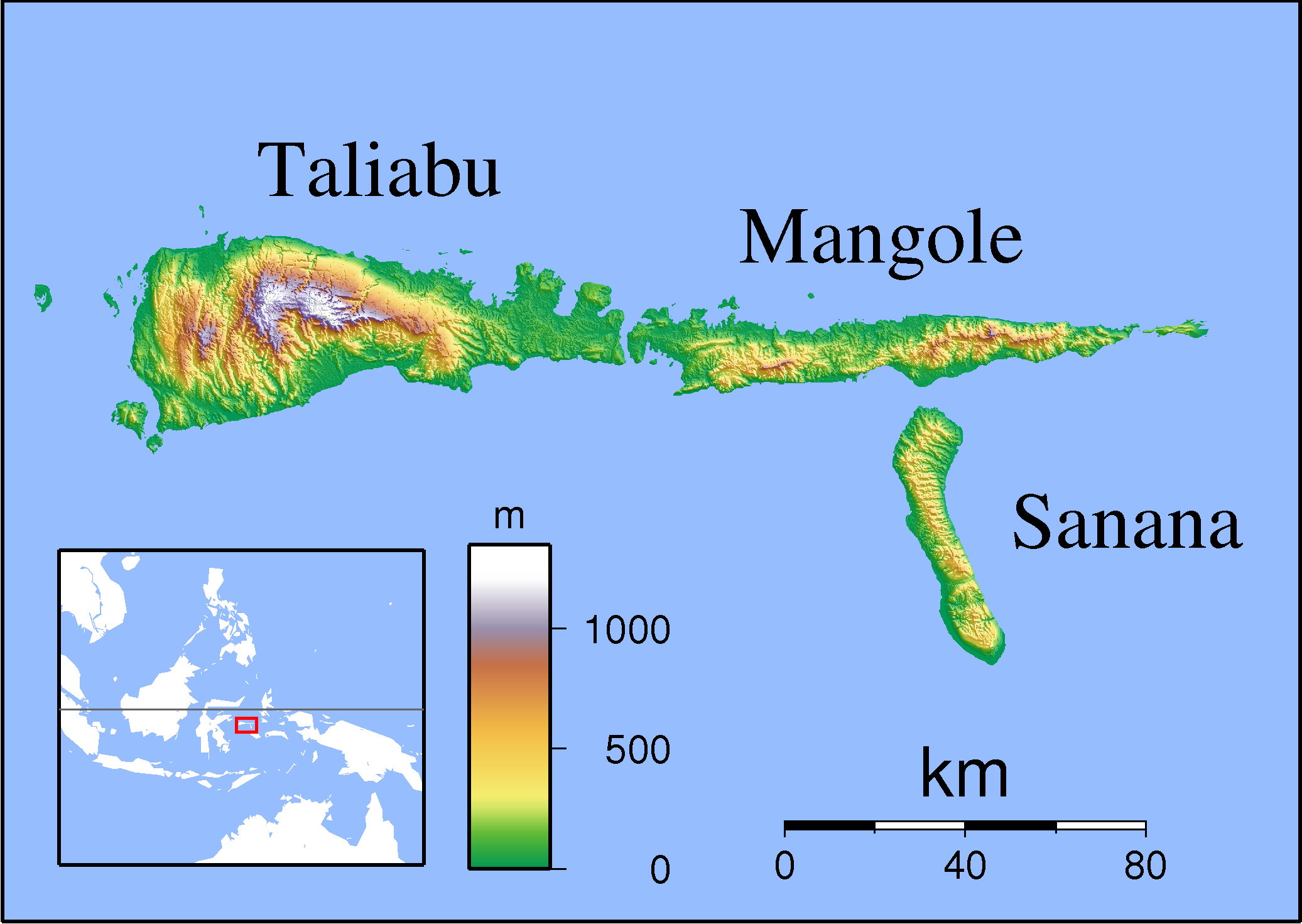
- Location in Sula Islands and Indonesia Taliabu Island Regency (Indonesia)
- Coordinates: 1.8°S 124.8°E
- Country: Indonesia
- Province: North Maluku
- Established: 14 December 2012
- Capital: Bobong

Government
  - Regent: Sashabila Mus
  - Vice Regent: La Ode Yasir

Area
  - Total: 2,775.30 km^{2} (1,071.55 sq mi)

Population (mid 2024 estimate)
  - Total: 66,361
  - Density: 23.911/km^{2} (61.930/sq mi)
- Time zone: UTC+9 (IEST)
- Area code: (+62) 921
- Website: taliabukab.go.id

Taliabu Island Regency (Indonesian: Kabupaten Pulau Taliabu) is a regency in the North Maluku province of Indonesia, consisting primarily of the island of Taliabu, the most western, geographically, of the Sula Archipelago. It is located to the west of Mangole Island and Sanana Island, the two islands which remain part of the former Sula Islands Regency; until 14 December 2012, when it was administratively-separated into its own regency, Taliabu had been a part of the Sula Islands Regency. Presently, Taliabu Island Regency (including minor offshore islands, predominantly to the west and southwest of Taliabu proper) covers roughly 2,775.30 km^{2} (582 mi^{2}). Taliabu had a population of 47,309 at the 2010 Census and 58,047 at the 2020 Census; the official estimate as of mid-2024 was 66,361 (comprising 33,930 males and 32,431 females).

== History ==
The establishment of the Taliabu Island Regency was intended to encourage the improvement of services in the fields of government, development and society, as well as the ability to utilize regional potentials for the implementation of regional autonomy, thus it was necessary to enact a law upon the establishment of Taliabu Island Regency within the province of North Maluku.

The legal basis of this law is Undang-Undang Dasar Negara Republik Indonesia Tahun 1945 Article 18, Article 18A, Article 18B, Article 20 and Article 21; Law Number 46 of 1999; Law Number 1 Year 2003; Law Number 32 of 2004; Law Number 33 of 2004; Law Number 27 Year 2009; Law Number 12 of 2011; Law Number 15 of 2011; and Law Number 8 of 2012.

This law regulates the establishment of the Taliabu Island Regency, consisting of 7 administrative districts (kecamatan) formerly part of the Sula Islands Regency—with one district being divided to create an eighth district—and includes 71 villages (desa).

== Demographics ==
=== Ethnic groups ===
The indigenous population living on Taliabu Island consisting of the Mange, Kadai, Siboyo, and Panto peoples who are classified as Taliabu people based on the language used, residential areas, livelihood, etc. In addition, migrants from outside the island also live there, namely the Ambonese, Buru, Tobelo, Galela, Makian, Ternate, Banggai, Butonese, Bajau, Menui, Buginese, Makassarese, and Javanese peoples. On the other hand, the Sula people living on the neighboring islands of Sulabesi and Mangole have inhabited the southern coast of Taliabu for hundreds of years, where the population is estimated to be half the population of the southern coast of Taliabu. However, it was found that the Butonese people are the most numerous on Taliabu Island.

Although the Taliabu residents consists of various tribes with different cultural backgrounds, however, the social life of the community has never experienced social inequality, especially social conflict. This is largely thanks to the wisdom of the elders and the indigenous people of Taliabu Island themselves, maintained through a policy known as Mangkalomu (lit. 'gather together to solve various problems'), which, in-turn, is based on another principle, Dadi Sia Kito Mangkoyong (lit. 'unite to move forward'). This philosophy of peaceful communal living has been used as a motto by the Taliabu Island Regency government with the term Hamungsia Sia Tofu (lit. 'together and united').

=== Religion ===
Based on 2019 data from the Central Statistics Agency, it was noted that the religion adopted by the majority of Taliabu Island district was Islam (75.16%). Smaller, but notable, percentages of the islanders are Christianity (24.84%), Protestantism (18.98%) or Catholicism (5.86%). Additionally, a smaller number of people embrace Hinduism, or local belief systems native to Taliabu.

== Administration ==
On 14 December 2012 the seven districts (kecamatan) on Taliabu Island (and its offshore islets) were split off from the Sula Islands Regency to create a separate Taliabu Island Regency (Kabupaten Pulau Taliabu); an eighth district (Tabona) was created at the same time. The districts are tabulated below with their areas and their populations at the 2010 Census and the 2020 Census, together with their official estimates as of mid-2024. The table also includes the locations of the district administrative centres, and the number of administrative villages (all rural desa) in each district. The post code is 97794 for the entire Regency.

Kode Wilayah	Name of District (kecamatan)	English name	Area in km^{2}	Pop'n Census 2010	Pop'n Census 2020	Pop'n Estimate mid 2024	Admin centre	No. of villages
82.08.01	Taliabu Barat ^{(a)}	Taliabu	520.77	9,027	14,196	16,880	Bobong	13
82.08.02	Taliabu Barat Laut ^{(b)}	Northwest Taliabu	188.69	4,079	4,813	5,525	Nggele	5
82.08.03	Lede ^{(b)}	Northwest Taliabu	162.43	5,977	7,709	8,453	Lede	5
82.08.04	Taliabu Utara	North Taliabu	807.85	10,880	13,194	15,074	Gela	19
82.08.05	Taliabu Timur	East Taliabu	372.38	3,542	3,192	3,592	Samuya	4
82.08.06	Taliabu Timur Selatan	Southeast Taliabu	153.04	5,066	4,440	4,988	Losseng	9
82.08.07	Taliabu Selatan	South Taliabu	313.62	8,738	7,258	8,321	Pencadu	9
82.08.08	Tabona		155.52	^{(c)}	3,245	3,528	Tabona	7
	Taliabu Island Regency		2,775.30	47,309	58,047	66,361	Bobong	71

Note: (a) includes small islands to the southwest of Taliabu, notable Pulau Seho and Pulau Kano.
(b) includes small islands to the west of Taliabu. (c) the 2010 population of the new Tabona District is included in the figure for Taliabu Timur Selatan District, from which it was cut out in 2012.

== Climate ==
Bobong, the seat of the regency has a tropical rainforest climate (Af) with moderate rainfall in September and October and heavy rainfall in the remaining months.

Climate data for Bobong
Month	Jan	Feb	Mar	Apr	May	Jun	Jul	Aug	Sep	Oct	Nov	Dec	Year
Mean daily maximum °C (°F)	30.7 (87.3)	30.6 (87.1)	30.8 (87.4)	31.0 (87.8)	30.6 (87.1)	30.3 (86.5)	29.8 (85.6)	30.2 (86.4)	31.0 (87.8)	31.4 (88.5)	32.1 (89.8)	31.1 (88.0)	30.8 (87.4)
Daily mean °C (°F)	26.9 (80.4)	26.8 (80.2)	27.0 (80.6)	27.2 (81.0)	27.1 (80.8)	26.9 (80.4)	26.4 (79.5)	26.4 (79.5)	26.8 (80.2)	26.9 (80.4)	27.9 (82.2)	27.2 (81.0)	27.0 (80.5)
Mean daily minimum °C (°F)	23.1 (73.6)	23.1 (73.6)	23.2 (73.8)	23.4 (74.1)	23.6 (74.5)	23.6 (74.5)	23.0 (73.4)	22.6 (72.7)	22.6 (72.7)	22.4 (72.3)	23.7 (74.7)	23.3 (73.9)	23.1 (73.7)
Average rainfall mm (inches)	279 (11.0)	245 (9.6)	253 (10.0)	226 (8.9)	229 (9.0)	262 (10.3)	181 (7.1)	125 (4.9)	101 (4.0)	103 (4.1)	148 (5.8)	215 (8.5)	2,367 (93.2)
Source: Climate-Data.org
