= Sanana =

- District
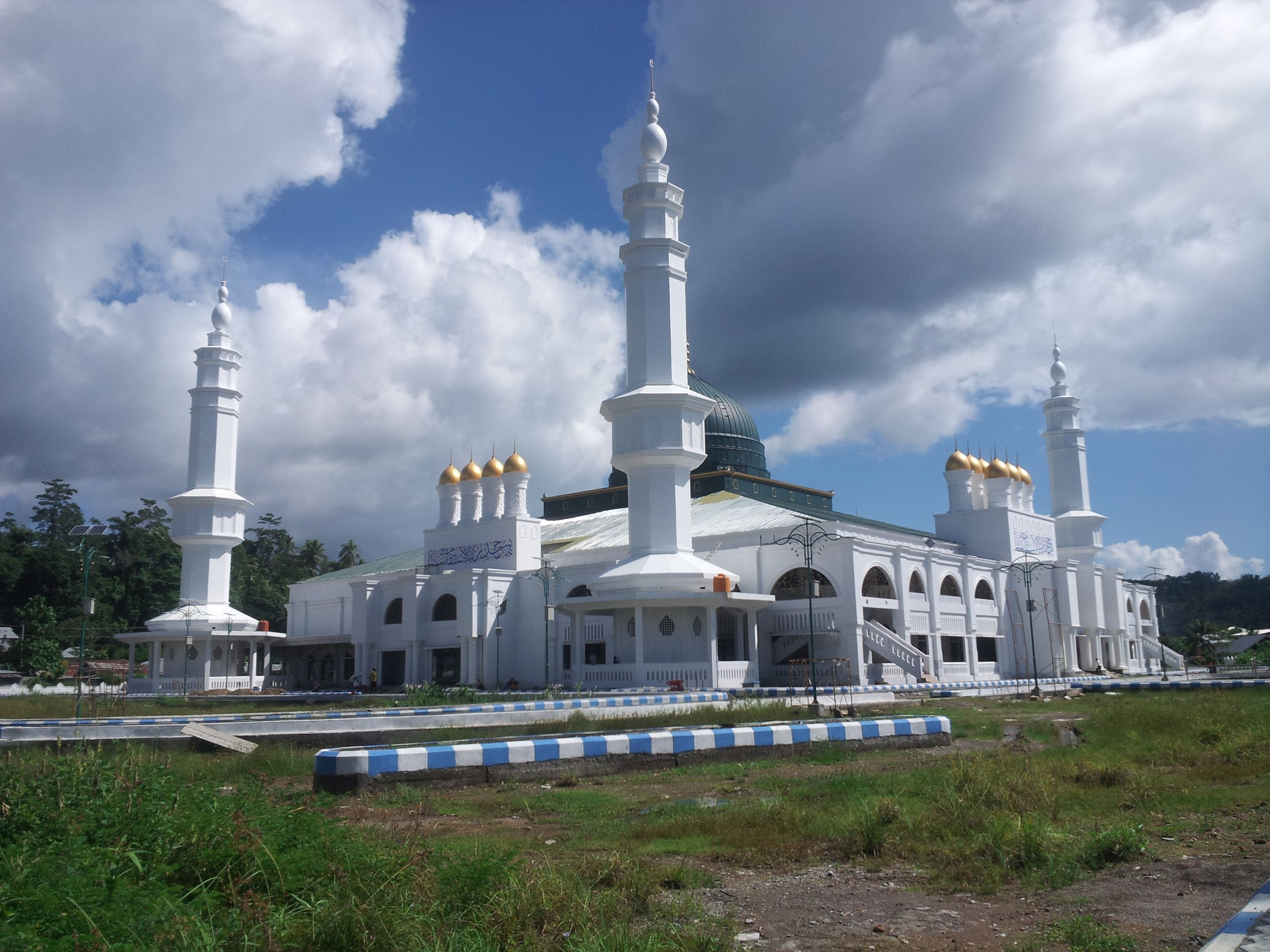
- Great Mosque of Sanana

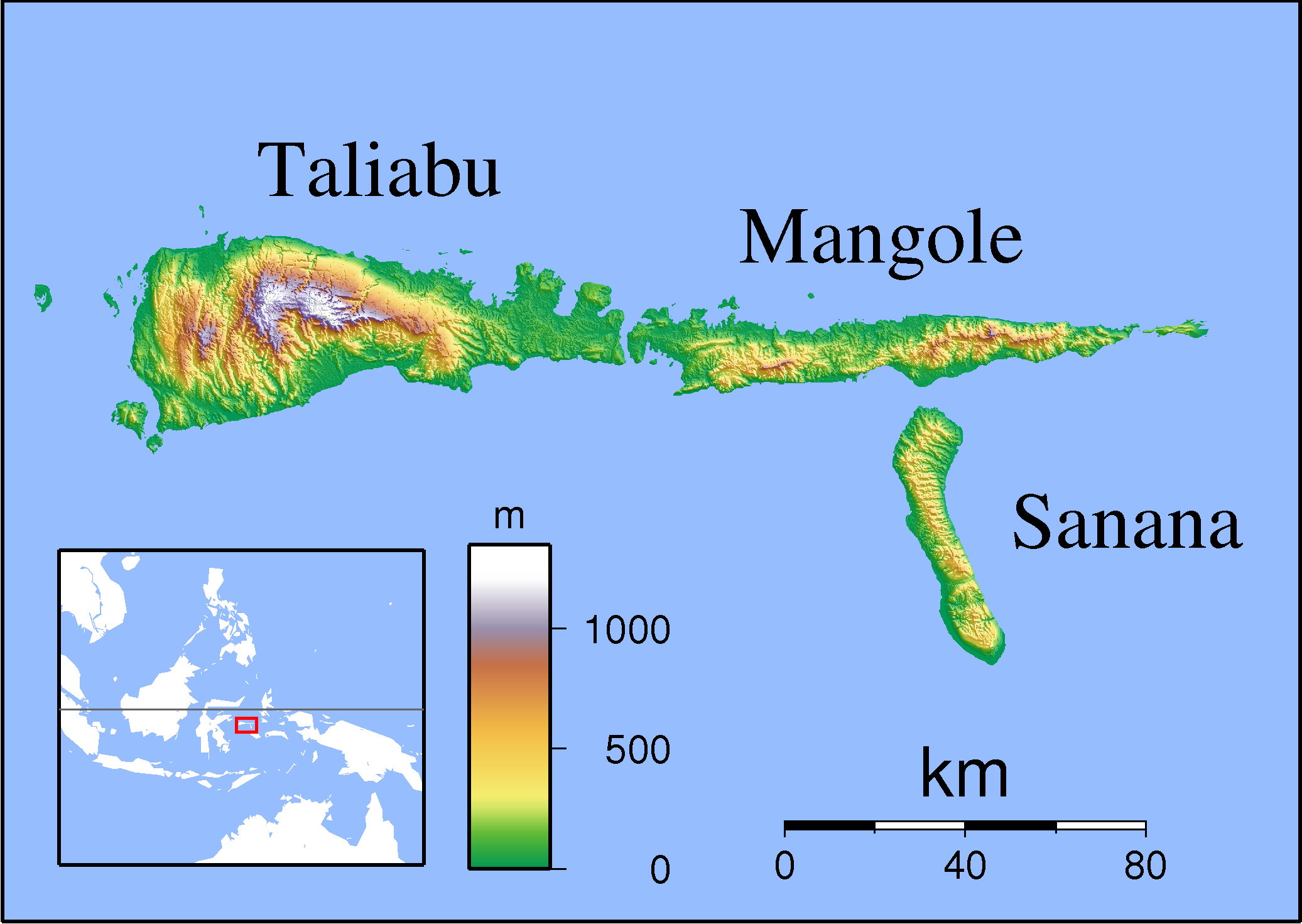
- Location in Sula Islands, Maluku and Indonesia Sanana (Maluku) Sanana (Indonesia)
- Coordinates: 2.0544588°S 125.9754028°E
- Country: Indonesia
- Region: Maluku
- Province: North Maluku
- Regency: Sula Islands Regency

Area
  - Total: 116.70 km^{2} (45.06 sq mi)

Population (mid 2024 estimate)
  - Total: 32,436
  - Density: 277.94/km^{2} (719.87/sq mi)
- Time zone: UTC+9 (Indonesia Eastern Standard Time)
- Postcode: 997795
- Area code: (+62) 921
- Villages: 11

Sanana is a town and administrative center of Sula Islands Regency, North Maluku, Indonesia. This town is located on Sulabesi Island (formerly called Sanana Island).

== Villages ==
Sanana consists of 11 villages (all classed as rural Desa) namely:

- Fagudu
- Falahu
- Fatcei
- Fogi
- Mangon
- Pastina
- Umaloya
- Wai Ipa
- Waibau
- Waihama
- Wailau
