= Sulabesi Island =

Island in North Moluccas, Indonesia

Sanana
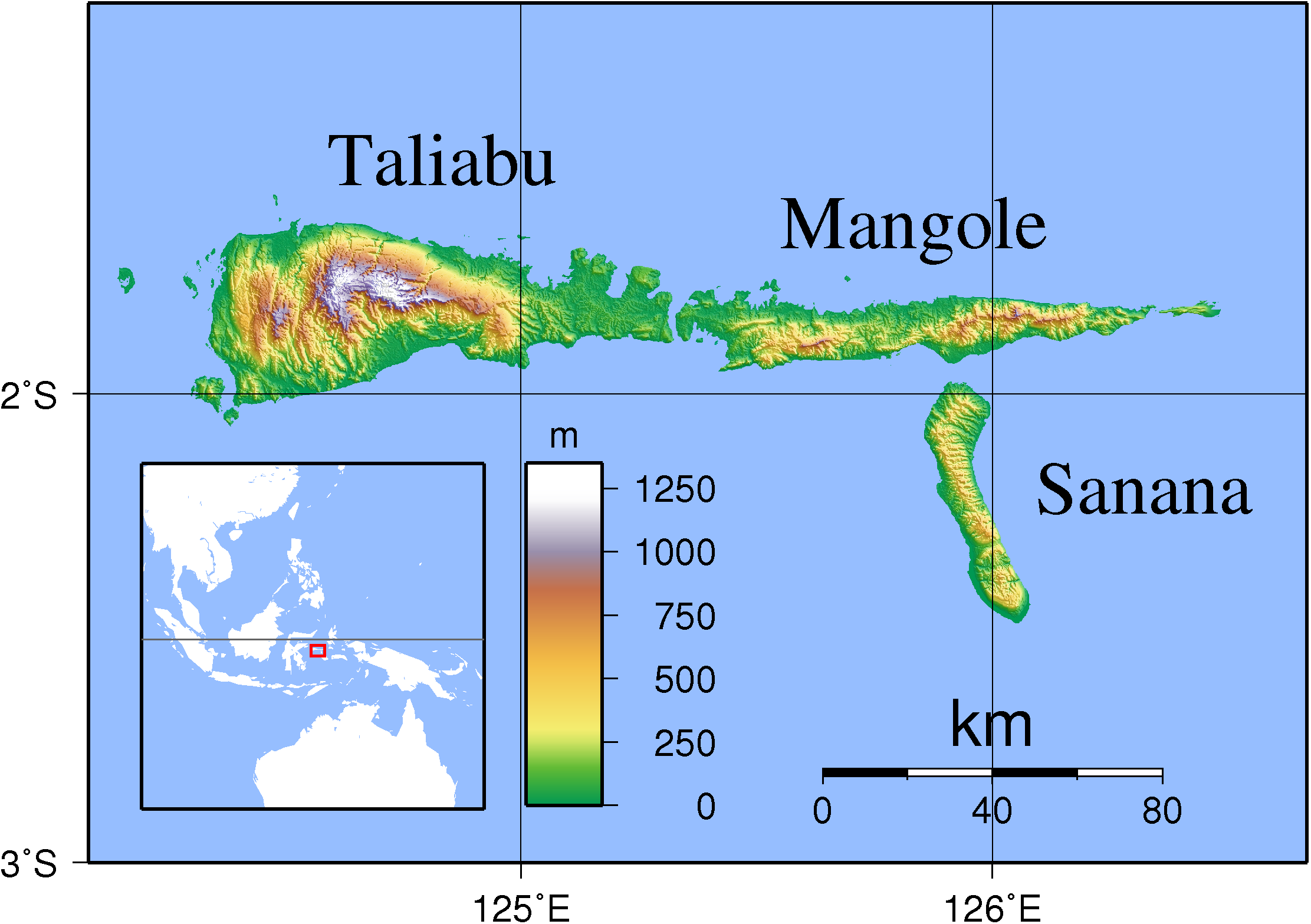

Geography
- Location: Southeast Asia
- Coordinates: 2.2°S 125.91667°E
- Archipelago: Maluku Islands
- Area: 1,196.12 km^{2} (461.82 sq mi)

Administration
- Indonesia
- Largest settlement: Sanana

Demographics
- Population: 64,346 (2020 Census)
- Pop. density: 53.8/km^{2} (139.3/sq mi)
- Ethnic groups: Sula

Sanana or Sulabesi Island (earlier name Xulla Besi) is an island south of Mangoli Island, and is part of the Sula Islands Regency in the North Maluku province of Indonesia. Sanana is also the name of that island's largest settlement, home to the Dutch era fort Benteng De Verwachting.

== Administrative districts ==
The island is divided into six districts within the Sula Islands Regency, which are set out below with their areas and the populations at the 2010 Census and the 2020 Census. The table also includes the locations of the district administrative centres, and the number of villages (rural desa and urban kelurahan) in each district.

Name	English name	Area in km^{2}	Population Census 2010	Population Census 2020	Admin centre	No. of villages
Sulbesi Barat	West Sulabesi	255.02	4,707	5,585	Kabau Darat	6
Sulabesi Selatan	South Sulabesi	284.00	4,298	5,545	Fuata	5
Sanana		157.36	25,183	33,994	Waihama	11
Sulabesi Tengah	Central Sulabesi	161.31	5,929	7,250	Waiboga	7
Sulabesi Timur	East Sulabesi	93.71	3,100	4,350	Baleha	6
Sanana Utara	North Sanana	244.78	5,675	7,622	Pohea	7
Sulabesi Island	(total)	1,196.12	48,892	64,346		42

== Transportation ==
Sanana airport is linked to Ambon by Trigana Air Service flights.

== History ==
As was common throughout Maluku at that time, Sanana suffered serious religio-ethnic tensions between Muslims and Christians during 1999.

== Flora and fauna ==
Frog Callulops kopsteini, also known as Kopstein's callulops frog, is endemic to Sanana Island.

== Gallery ==
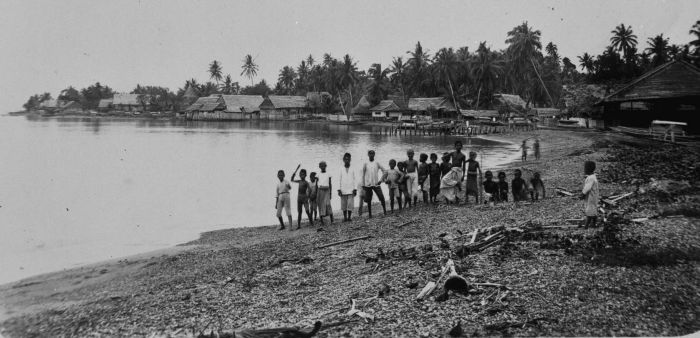
Men and children on the beach (1930–1936)

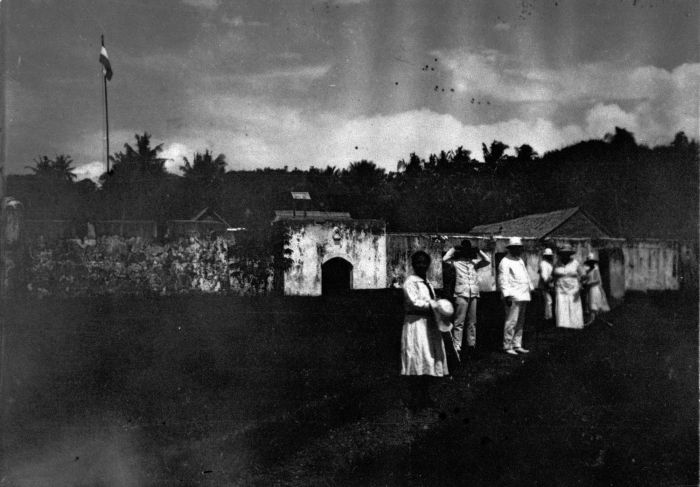
Fort de Verwachtingh in 1921
