= Mangole Island =

Island in North Maluku, Indonesia

Mangoli
- Location within Maluku

Geography
- Location: South East Asia
- Coordinates: 1.8°S 125.8°E
- Archipelago: Maluku Islands
- Area: 2,142.48 km^{2} (827.22 sq mi)

Administration
- Indonesia
- Province: North Maluku

Demographics
- Population: 39,736 (2020 Census)
- Pop. density: 18.55/km^{2} (48.04/sq mi)
- Ethnic groups: Sula (mainly Mangole), Butonese, and others

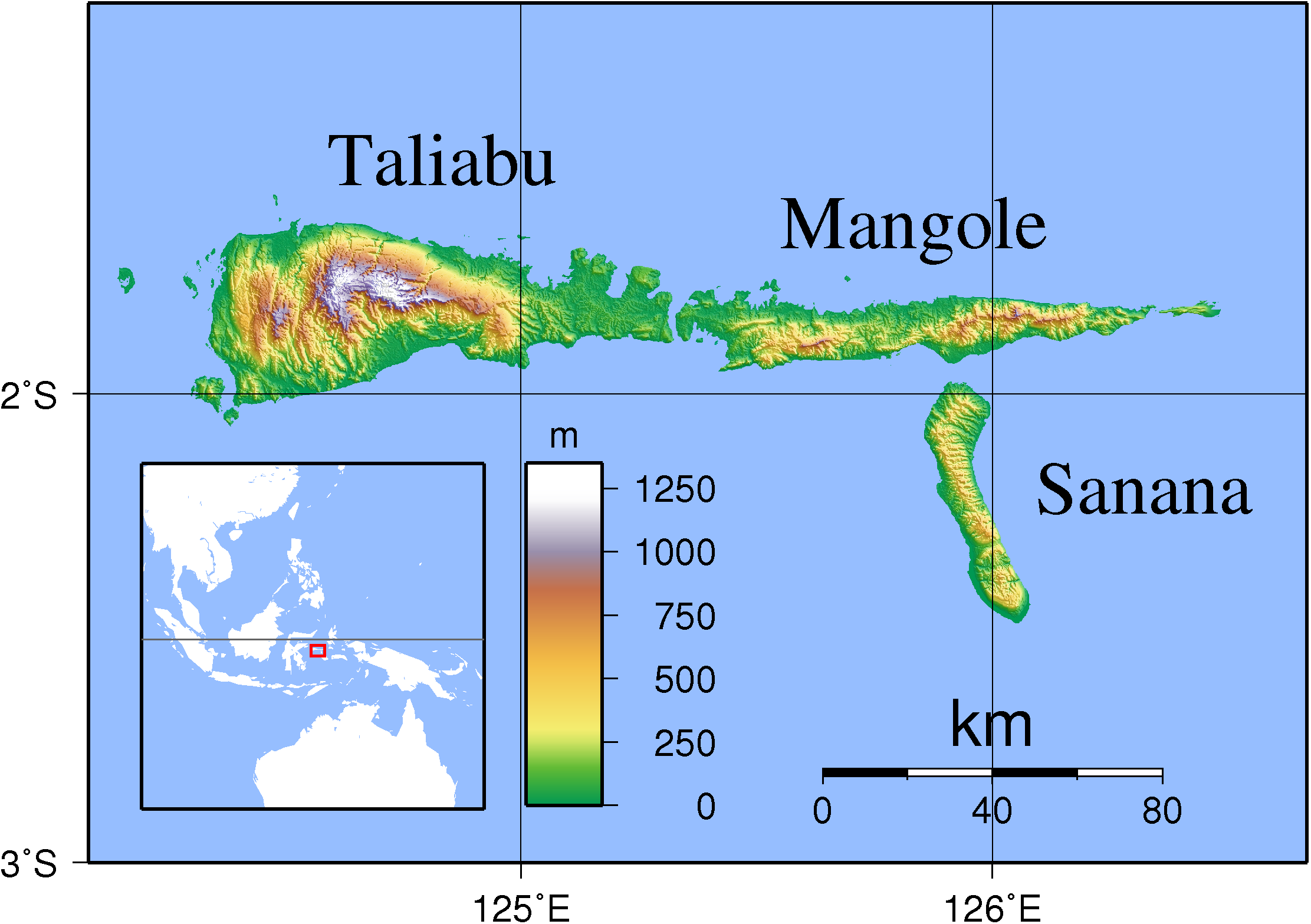
The Sula Islands, showing Mangole

Mangoli or Mangole (Xulla Mangola – earlier name and Mangon – local name) is a large island in the Sula Islands, which are part of North Maluku province in Indonesia. It is located at 1.8°S 125.8°E, east of Taliabu Island and north of Sanana Island. It has an area of 2,142.48 km^{2}. At the 2010 Census, 36,323 people lived on the island of Mangoli, which rose to 39,736 at the 2020 Census. Its economy is dominated by the timber industry.

== Districts ==
The island is divided into six districts within the Sula Islands Regency, listed below with their areas and populations at the 2010 Census and the 2020 Census. The table also includes the locations of the district administrative centres, and the number of villages (rural desa and urban kelurahan) in each district.

| Name | English name | Area in km^{2} | Population Census 2010 | Population Census 2020 | Admin centre | No. of villages |
|---|---|---|---|---|---|---|
| Mangoli Timur | East Mangoli | 395.87 | 4,301 | 5,613 | Waitina | 5 |
| Mangoli Tengah | Central Mangoli | 373.83 | 6,381 | 7,644 | Mangoli | 9 |
| Mangoli Utara Timur | Northeast Mangoli | 374.75 | 3,777 | 4,735 | Waisakai | 4 |
| Mangoli Barat | West Mangoli | 236.29 | 7,084 | 7,198 | Dofa | 7 |
| Mangoli Utara | North Mangoli | 431.94 | 10,115 | 9,373 | Falabisahaya | 8 |
| Mangoli Selatan | South Mangoli | 329.80 | 4,665 | 5,173 | Buya | 5 |
| Mangoli Island | (total) | 2,142.48 | 36,323 | 39,736 | | 38 |

== Notes ==
- Asia-Pacific Quake rocks Indonesian islands from BBC News, 30 November 1998
