= Sula Islands =

Island group in North Maluku Province, Indonesia

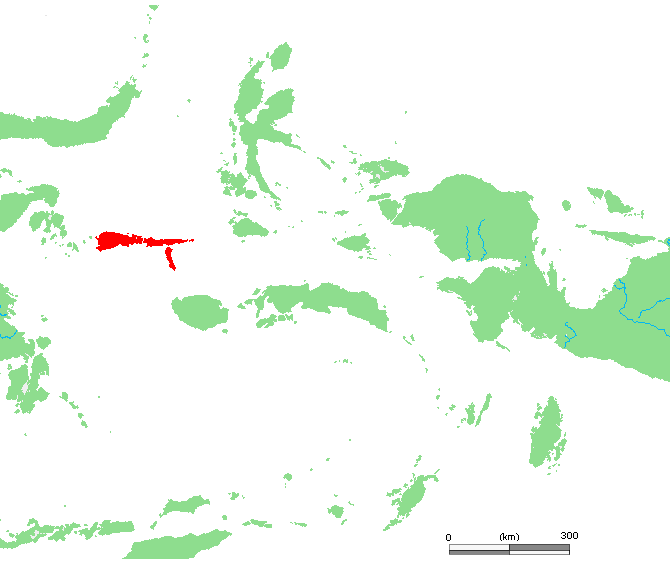

Geography
- Location: Southeast Asia

Administration
- Indonesia
- North Maluku

Additional information
- Time zone: IEST (UTC+09:00)

The Sula Islands are an archipelago of Indonesia.

They consist of islands of the Taliabu Island Regency and the eponym regency.

The three major islands are Taliabu, Mangole and Sulabesi.

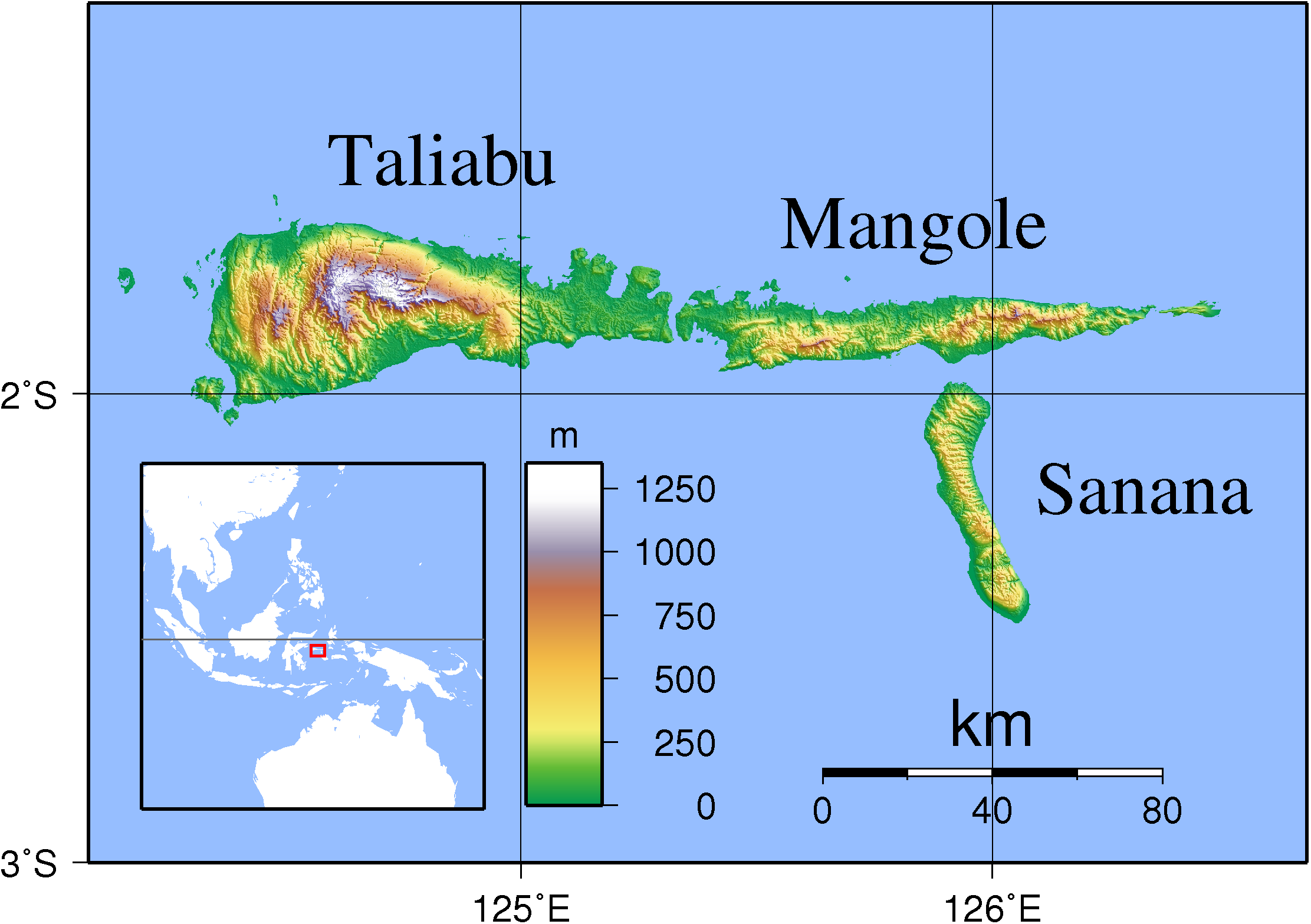
