= List of contemporary ethnic groups of Oceania =

List of Oceanian ethnic groups

The following is a list of contemporary ethnic groups of Oceania. There has been constant debate over the classification of ethnic groups. Membership of an ethnic group tends to be associated with shared ancestry, history, homeland, language or dialect and cultural heritage; where the term "culture" specifically includes aspects such as religion, mythology and ritual, cuisine, dressing (clothing) style and other factors.

By the nature of the concept, ethnic groups tend to be divided into subgroups, may themselves be or not be identified as independent ethnic groups depending on the source consulted.

Oceania here is considered to be approximately delimited from Asia by the Weber Line in Wallacea located west of the Indonesian islands of Maluku (except for the Sula Archipelago and Barat Daya) and from the Americas by Micronesia and the Polynesian Triangle.

== Ethnic groups ==
The following groups are commonly identified as "ethnic groups", as opposed to ethno-linguistic phyla, national groups, racial groups or similar.

Ethnicity	Language(s)	Primary homeland	Subgroups, tribes & castes	Religion(s)
Abelam	Sepik → Ndu → Ambulas	Papua New Guinea (East Sepik)	Maprik (Northern Abelam), Wosera (Southern Abelam)	Christianity
Ambonese	Austronesian → Malayic → Ambonese Malay	Indonesia (Ambon Island)		Christianity → Protestantism → Calvinism
Amung	Uhunduni languages (Note: Language family; with some exceptions, all speakers of the various languages within this family are typically seen as one singular ethnicity.)	Indonesia (Mimika, Puncak)		Christianity
Anglo-Celtic Australians	Indo-European → Germanic → English → Australian English	Australia	New South Welsh, Victorians, Queenslanders, Western Australians, South Australians, Tasmanians, Canberrans, Territorians	Christianity
Anglo-New Zealanders	Indo-European → Germanic → English → New Zealand English	New Zealand	North Islanders, South Islanders, Stewart Islanders, Chatham Islanders	Christianity → Protestantism → Anglicanism
Angu	Trans-New Guinea → Angan	Papua New Guinea (Kratke Range)		Animism
Anindilyakwa	East Arnhem → Anindilyakwa–Nunggubuyu → Anindilyakwa	Australia (Groote Eylandt, Bickerton Island)		Animism
Antakirinja	Pama-Nyungan → Wati → Antakarinya	Australia (South Australia)		Animism
Anuta	Austronesian → Polynesian → Anuta	Solomon Islands (Anuta)		Christianity
Arrernte	Pama-Nyungan → Arandic → Arrernte	Australia (Arrernte Land)		Alcheringa
Asmat	Trans–New Guinea → Asmat–Kamrau → Asmat	Indonesia (Asmat Regency, South Papua)	Joirat, Emari Ducur, Bismam, Becembub, Simai, Kenekap, Unir Siran, Unir Epmak, Safan, Aramatak, Bras, Yupmakcain	Christianity → Catholicism
Austral Islanders	Austronesian → Polynesian → Austral	France (Austral Islands)		Christianity
Baining	Baining languages	Papua New Guinea (Gazelle Peninsula)	Kairak, Mali, Qaqet, Simbali, Ura	Christianity, Pomio Kivung
Banabans	Austronesian → Micronesian → Gilbertese; historically Austronesian → Micronesian → Banaban	Kiribati (Banaba), Fiji (Rabi Island)		Christianity
Bandanese	Austronesian → Malayic → Banda Malay; Austronesian → Central Maluku → Banda	Indonesia (Banda Islands)		Islam, Christianity
Bauzi	East Geelvink Bay → Bauzi	Indonesia (Papua)		Animism
Bellonese	Austronesian → Polynesian → Bellonese	Solomon Islands (Rennell and Bellona)		Christianity
Biak	Austronesian → Malayo-Polynesian → Biak	Indonesia (Biak Islands)		Christianity
Bininj	Macro-Gunwinyguan → Gunwinyguan → Bininj Kunwok	Australia (Arnhem Land)	Kunwinjku, Kuninjku, Kundjeyhmi (Gundjeihmi), Manyallaluk Mayali, Kundedjnjenghmi, Kune	Australian Aboriginal religion
Bonin Islanders	Indo-European → English-based creoles → Bonin English; Japonic → Japanese; Indo-European → Germanic → English → American English	Japan (Bonin Islands)		Christianity, Buddhism, Shinto
Caldoche	Indo-European → Romance → French, Francosign → French Sign	France (New Caledonia)		Christianity → Catholicism
Carolinians	Austronesian → Micronesian → Carolinian	United States (Northern Mariana Islands)		Christianity → Catholicism
Chamorro	Austronesian → Malayo-Polynesian → Chamorro	United States (Mariana Islands)		Christianity → Catholicism
Chuukese	Austronesian → Micronesian → Chuukese	Federated States of Micronesia (Chuuk Lagoon)		Christianity → Catholicism
Cocos Malays	Malay creoles → Cocos Malay	Australia (Cocos (Keeling) Islands)	significant populations in Malaysia	Islam → Sunnism,Non Religious,Christianity
Cook Islanders	Austronesian → Polynesian → Cook Islands Māori, Austronesian → Polynesian → Penrhyn, Austronesian → Polynesian → Rakahanga-Manihiki, Austronesian → Polynesian → Pukapukan	New Zealand (Cook Islands)		Christianity → Protestantism
Dani	Trans-New Guinea → West Papuan Highlands → Dani	Papua New Guinea (Baliem Valley), Indonesia (Highland Papua)		Christianity → Protestantism, Animism
Dharug	Pama-Nyungan → Yuin–Kuric → Dharug	Australia (Sydney)		Dreamtime
Djagaraga	Pama-Nyungan → Paman → Djagaraga	Australia (Cape York Peninsula)		Dreamtime
Djangadi	Pama-Nyungan → Yuin–Kuric → Djangadi	Australia (New South Wales)		Australian Aboriginal religion
Ekari	Trans–New Guinea → Paniai Lakes → Ekari	Indonesia (Wissel Lakes)		Christianity
Emae	Austronesian → Polynesian → Emae	Vanuatu (Emae)	Makata	Christianity
Eora	Pama-Nyungan → Yuin–Kuric → Dharug	Australia (Sydney)		Dreamtime
Fijians (Note: Endonymically known as iTaukei.)	Austronesian → Central Pacific → Fijian	Fiji	Significant populatitons in the United States, Australia, the United Kingdom	Christianity → Protestantism → Methodism
Futuna-Aniwa	Austronesian → Polynesian → Futuna-Aniwa	Vanuatu (Futuna, Aniwa)		Christianity
Futunans	Austronesian → Polynesian → Futunan	France (Wallis and Futuna)		Christianity
Galela	West Papuan → North Halmahera → Galela	Indonesia (North Maluku)		Islam (60%), Christianity (40%)
Gamilaraay	Pama-Nyungan → Wiradhuric → Gamilaraay	Australia (New South Wales, Queensland)		Alcheringa
Gubbi Gubbi	Pama-Nyungan → Waka-Gabi → Gubbi Gubbi	Australia (Queensland)		Dreamtime
Gumbaynggirr	Pama-Nyungan → Gumbaynggiric → Gumbaynggirr	Australia (New South Wales)		Australian Aboriginal religion
Gundungurra	Pama-Nyungan → Yuin-Kuric → Ngunnawal–Gundungurra	Australia (New South Wales)		Dreamtime
Gunaikurnai	Pama-Nyungan → Gippsland → Gunaikurnai	Australia (Gippsland)	Brataualung, Braiakaulung, Brabiralung, Tatungalung, Krauatungalung	Australian Aboriginal religion
Gurindji	Pama–Nyungan → Ngumpin–Yapa → Gurindji, Pama–Nyungan and Indo-European → Gurindji and Australian Kriol → Gurindji Kriol	Australia (Northern Territory)		Dreamtime
Haole	Indo-European → Germanic → English → United States English; Francosign → ASLic → American Sign	United States (Hawaii)		Christianity → Catholicism, Protestantism
Hawaiians	Austronesian → Polynesian → Hawaiian, (Note: Since Hawaii's annexation into the United States, English has almost completely supplanted Hawaiian.) Indo-European → Germanic → English Creole → Hawaiian Pidgin, Hawaiʻi Sign, Hawaiʻi Sign and American Sign → Creole Hawaiʻi Sign	United States (Hawaii)		Christianity, Hawaiian religion
Huli	Trans–New Guinea → Engan → Huli	Papua New Guinea (Southern Highlands Province)		Christianity, Papuan religion
Iatmul	Sepik → Iatmul	Papua New Guinea (East Sepik Province)		Christianity
Indo-Fijians	Indo-European → Indo-Aryan → Hindustani → Fiji Hindi; Indo-European → Germanic → English; Dravidian → Tamiloid → Tamil; Austronesian → Central Pacific → Fijian	Fiji	Significant populations in Australia, New Zealand, United States, Canada, and United Kingdom	Hinduism, Islam, Christianity, Sikhism
Iwaidja	Iwaidjan → Iwaidja	Australia (Cobourg Peninsula)		Australian Aboriginal religion
Jawoyn	Arnhem → Gunwinyguan → Jawoyn	Australia (Northern Territory)	Bagala	Australian Aboriginal religion
Kaluli	Trans-New Guinea → Kaluli	Papua New Guinea (Great Papuan Plateau)		Papuan religion
Kanaks	Austronesian → Kanak	France (Kanaky)	Haveke, Ajie, Arha, Xaragure, Haeke	Christianity → Catholicism
Kao	West Papuan → North Halmahera → Kao; West Papuan → North Halmahera → Modole	Indonesia (Kao Land)	Pagu, Modole people, Boeng, Towiliko	Christianity, Islam, Animism
Kapingamarangi	Austronesian → Polynesian → Kapingamarangi	Federated States of Micronesia (Kapingamarangi)		Christianity
Kartudjara	Pama-Nyungan → Wati → Wati	Australia (Southern Australia)		Animism
Kaurna	Pama-Nyungan → Thura-Yura → Kaurna (Note: The Kaurna language went extinct in 1929 but revival efforts have been ongoing since the 1980s. Most Kaurna people now mainly speak English.)	Australia (South Australia)		Dreamtime
Kepanī	Indo-European → Germanic → English, Hawaiian Pidgin; Japonic → Japanese	United States (Hawaii)	Okinawan Hawaiians	Buddhism, Shinto, Christianity
Kiribati	Austronesian → Micronesian → Gilbertese	Gilbert Islands (Kiribati)		Christianity, Baháʼí Faith
Koara	Pama-Nyungan → Wati → Wati	Australia (Western Australia)		Animism
Kokatha	Pama-Nyungan → Wati → Wati	Australia (South Australia)		Animism
Kosraeans	Austronesian → Micronesian → Kosraean	Federated States of Micronesia (Kosrae)		Christianity
Kulin	Pama-Nyungan → Kulinic → Kulin	Australia (Victoria)		Alcheringa
Kuwarranyji	Pama–Nyungan → Ngumpin–Yapa → Mudburra → Kuwarranyji	Australia (Northern Territory)		Alcheringa
Lani	Trans-New Guinea → Western Dani	Indonesia (Central Papua, Highland Papua)		Christianity, Animism
Larrakia	Larrakia	Australia (Northern Territory)		Alcheringa
Loloda	West Papuan → North Halmahera → Loloda	Indonesia (Loloda Islands)		Christianity (60%),Islam (40%)
Luangiua	Austronesian → Polynesian → Luangiua	Solomon Islands (Ontong Java)		Christianity
Luritja	Pama-Nyungan → Wati → Luritja	Australia (Northern Territory)		Alcheringa
Makianese	West Papuan → North Halmahera → Moi, Austronesian → South Halmahera → Taba,	Indonesia (Makian)	Tabayama, Jitinee	Islam → Sunni Islam, Animism
Mangarevans	Austronesian → Polynesian → Mangareva	France (Gambier Islands)		Christianity
Māori	Austronesian → Polynesian → New Zealand Māori, (Note: Although the Māori have been able to halt the extinction of their language, the majority still only speak English fluently.)	New Zealand	Māori Indians, with significant populations in the United Kingdom, Australia, and the United States	Christianity
Marquesas Islanders	Austronesian → Polynesian → Marquesan	France (Marquesas Islands)		Christianity
Marshallese	Austronesian → Micronesian → Marshallese	Marshall Islands		Christianity → Protestantism
Mele-Fila	Austronesian → Polynesian → Mele-Fila	Vanuatu (Mele, Ifira)	Erakoro, Eratapu	Christianity
Moriori	Austronesian → Polynesian → Moriori, (Note: The Moriori language went extinct in 1898 but revival efforts have been ongoing since 2001.) Indo-European → Germanic → English	New Zealand (Chatham Islands)		Christianity including Rātana
Motu	Austronesian → Papuan Tip → Motu	Papua New Guinea (Central Province)		Christianity, Shamanism
Mudburra	Pama–Nyungan → Ngumpin–Yapa → Mudburra	Australia (Northern Territory)		Alcheringa
Muruwari	Pama-Nyungan → Central New South Wales → Muruwari	Australia (New South Wales, Queensland)		Dreamtime
Nauruans	Austronesian → Micronesian → Nauruan	Nauru		Christianity → Protestantism
Ngardi	Pama-Nyungan → Wati → Ngardi	Australia (Northern Territory, Western Australia)		Dreamtime
Ngarinyin	Worrorran → Ngarinyin	Australia (Western Australia)		Dreamtime
Ngunnawal	Pama-Nyungan → Yuin-Kuric → Ngunnawal–Gundungurra	Australia (Australian Capital Territory, New South Wales)		Dreamtime
Ni-Vanuatu	Indo-European → English Creole → Bislama; over 100 Oceanic languages	Vanuatu		Christianity, Animism
Niueans	Austronesian → Malayo-Polyesian → Polynesian → Niuean	New Zealand (Niue)		Christianity → Protestantism → Calvinism
Noongar	Pama-Nyungan → Nyungic → Noongar	Australia (Western Australia)	Amangu, Ballardong, Yued, Kaneang, Koreng, Mineng, Njakinjaki, Njunga, Pibelmen, Pindjarup, Wadandi, Whadjuk, Wiilman, Wudjari	Alcheringa
Norfolk Islanders	Indo-European → Germanic → English, Indo-European → Germanic → English Creole → Pitcairn–Norfolk → Norfuk	Australia (Norfolk Island)		Irreligion, Christianity → Protestantism → Anglicanism
Nugurians	Austronesian → Polynesian → Nuguria	Papua New Guinea (Nuguria)		Christianity
Nukumanu	Austronesian → Polynesian → Nukumanu	Papua New Guinea (Nukumanu)		Christianity
Nukuorans	Austronesian → Polynesian → Nukuoro	Federated States of Micronesia (Nukuoro)		Christianity
Ouvéans	Austronesian → Polynesian → West Uvean	France (New Caledonia (Ouvéa))		Christianity
Pākehā	Indo-European → Germanic →English → New Zealand English	New Zealand		Irreligion, Christianity
Palauans	Austronesian → Malayo-Polynesian → Palauan; Indo-European → Germanic → English → Palauan English	Palau		Christianity, Modekngei
Palawa	Indo-European → Germanic → English; Palawa kani; historically Tasmanian languages (Note: Though many Tasmanian languages are not genetically related to each other, they are all known to be ethnolects developed by the Palawa.)	Australia (Tasmania)		Alcheringa
Pileni	Austronesian → Polynesian → Vaeakau-Taumako	Solomon Islands (Reef Islands)		Christianity
Pintupi	Pama-Nyungan → Wati → Pintupi	Australia (Western Australia)		Dreamtime
Pitcairn Islanders	Indo-European → Germanic → English, Indo-European → Germanic → English Creole → Pitcairn-Norfolk → Pitkern	British Overseas Territories (Pitcairn Islands)	Significant population in Norfolk Island, along with a diaspora in Australia, and New Zealand	Christianity → Protestantism → Seventh-day Adventism
Pitjantjara	Pama-Nyungan → Wati → Pitjantjara	Australia (Central Australia)		Alcheringa
Pohnpeians	Austronesian → Micronesian → Pohnpeian	Federated States of Micronesia (Pohnpei)		Christianity
Rapa Iti	Austronesian → Polynesian → Rapa	France (Rapa Iti)		Christianity
Rapa Nui	Austronesian → Polynesian → Rapa Nui	Chile (Easter Island)		Christianity → Catholicism
Rennellese	Austronesian → Polynesian → Rennellese	Solomon Islands (Rennell and Bellona)		Christianity
Rotumans	Austronesian → Central Pacific → Rotuman	Fiji (Rotuma)		Christianity → Protestantism → Seventh-day Adventism, Methodism; Catholicism
Samoans	Austronesian → Polynesian → Samoan	Samoan Islands (Samoa, American Samoa)	American Samoans, Samoan Samoans, with significant populations in New Zealand, the United States	Christianity
Sikaiana	Austronesian → Polynesian → Sikaiana	Solomon Islands (Sikaiana)		Christianity
Sonsorolese	Austronesian → Micronesian → Sonsorolese	Palau (Sonsorol)		Christianity
South Sea Islanders	Indo-European → Germanic → English → Australian English	Australia (Queensland)		Christianity
Tabaru	West Papuan → North Halmahera → Tabaru	Indonesia (Jailolo)		Animism
Tahitians	Austronesian → Polynesian → Tahitian (Note: Due to France's long history of promoting the French language at the expense of others, the vast majority only speak French.)	France (Tahiti)		Christianity
Takuu	Austronesian → Polynesian → Takuu	Papua New Guinea (Takuu)		Christianity
Ternate	West Papuan → North Halmahera → Ternate	Indonesia (Ternate)	Tubo, Tobona, Tabanga, Toboleu, Ibu, Jailolo, Ternate-Portuguese	Islam → Sunni Islam, Christianity,Animism
Tidore	West Papuan → North Halmahera → Tidore	Indonesia (Tidore)		Islam,Christianity
Tikopia	Austronesian → Polynesian → Tikopia	Solomon Islands (Tikopia)		Christianity
Tiwi	Tiwi	Australia (Tiwi Islands)		Alcheringa
Tobati	Austronesian → North New Guinea → Tobati	Indonesia (Jayapura)		Christianity, Islam
Tobelo	West Papuan → North Halmahera → Tobelo	Indonesia (North Halmahera)	Dodinga, Boeng, Kao, Maba	Christianity → Protestantism, Animism, Islam → Sunni Islam
Tobians	Austronesian → Micronesian → Tobian	Palau (Hatohobei)		Christianity
Togutils	West Papuan → North Halmahera → Togutil	Indonesia (North Halmahera (Aketajawe-Lolobata National Park))	Totodoku, Tukur-Tukur, Lolobata, Kobekulo, Buli	Animism, Christianity, Islam
Tokelauans	Austronesian → Polynesian → Tokelauan	Tokelau		Christianity → Congregationalism
Tongans	Austronesian → Polynesian → Tongan	Tonga	Tongan Hawaiians	Christianity
Torres Strait Islanders	Pama-Nyungan → Kalaw Lagaw Ya, Eastern Trans-Fly → Meriam, Indo-European → Germanic → English → Torres Strait Creole	Australia (Torres Strait Islands)		Christianity
Tuamotuans	Austronesian → Polynesian → Tuamotuan	France (Tuamotus)		Christianity
Tuvaluans	Austronesian → Polynesian → Tuvaluan	Tuvalu	Kioa	Christianity
Wakka Wakka	Pama-Nyungan → Waka-Gabi → Wakka Wakka (Note: The Wakka Wakka language went extinct, and currently most Wakka Wakka people mainly speak in English.)	Australia (Queensland)		Dreamtime
Wallisians	Austronesian → Polynesian → Wallisian	France (Wallis and Futuna)		Christianity
Warlpiris	Pama–Nyungan → Ngumpin–Yapa → Warlpiri, Indo-European and Pama–Nyungan → Warlpiri and Australian Kriol → Light Warlpiri	Australia (Northern Territory)		Dreamtime
Waropen	Austronesian → South Halmahera–West New Guinea → Waropen	Indonesia (Waropen Regency)		Christianity
Wik	Pama-Nyungan → Paman → Wik	Australia (Cape York Peninsula)	Wik-Mungkan, Wiknantjara, Wikmean, Wikepa, Wik-kalkan, Wikapatja, Wikampama	Dreamtime
Wiradjuri	Pama-Nyungan → Wiradhuric → Wiradjuri	Australia (New South Wales)		Dreamtime
Worrorra	Worrorran → Worrrorra	Australia (Western Australia)		Dreamtime
Wunambal	Worrorran → Wunambal	Australia (Western Australia)		Dreamtime
Yali	Trans-New Guinea → Yali	Indonesia (Baliem Valley)		Christianity, Animism
Yapese	Austronesian → Oceanic → Yapese	Federated States of Micronesia (Yap)		Christianity
Yolngu	Pama-Nyungan → Yolngu	Australia (Miwatj)	Dhuwa (Rirratjingu, Galpu, Djambarrpuyngu, Golumala, Marrakulu, Marrangu, Djapu, Datiwuy, Ngaymil, Djarrwark), Yirritja (Gumatj, Gupapuyngu, Wangurri, Ritharrngu, Mangalili, Munyuku, Madarrpa, Warramiri, Dhalwangu, Liyalanmirri)	Alcheringa
Yugambeh	Pama-Nyungan → Bandjalangic → Yugambeh	Australia (Queensland)		Alcheringa
ꞋAreꞌare	Austronesian → Southeast Solomonic → ꞋAreꞌare	Solomon Islands (Malaita)		Christianity
