= Salawaku =

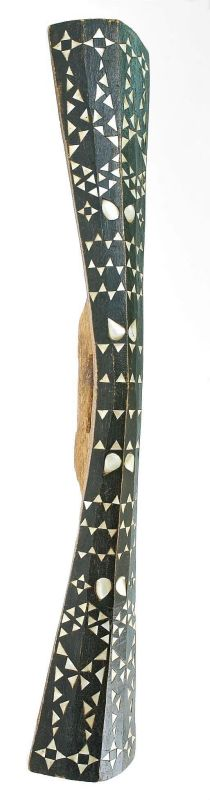
- A Salawaku shield, circa 1850–1900.
- Type: Shield
- Place of origin: Indonesia (Maluku Islands)

Service history
- Used by: Ambonese, Buru people, Manusela people, Nuaulu people, Tobelo people

A Salawaku (in the Tidore and Pagu languages), is a traditional shield originating from the Maluku Islands. It is also known as Ma Dadatoko, Salwake, Saluwaku or Salawako in Galela, Salawakunu in Loloda, Hawau-mu in Madole, Emuli in Buru or O Dadatoko in Tobelo.

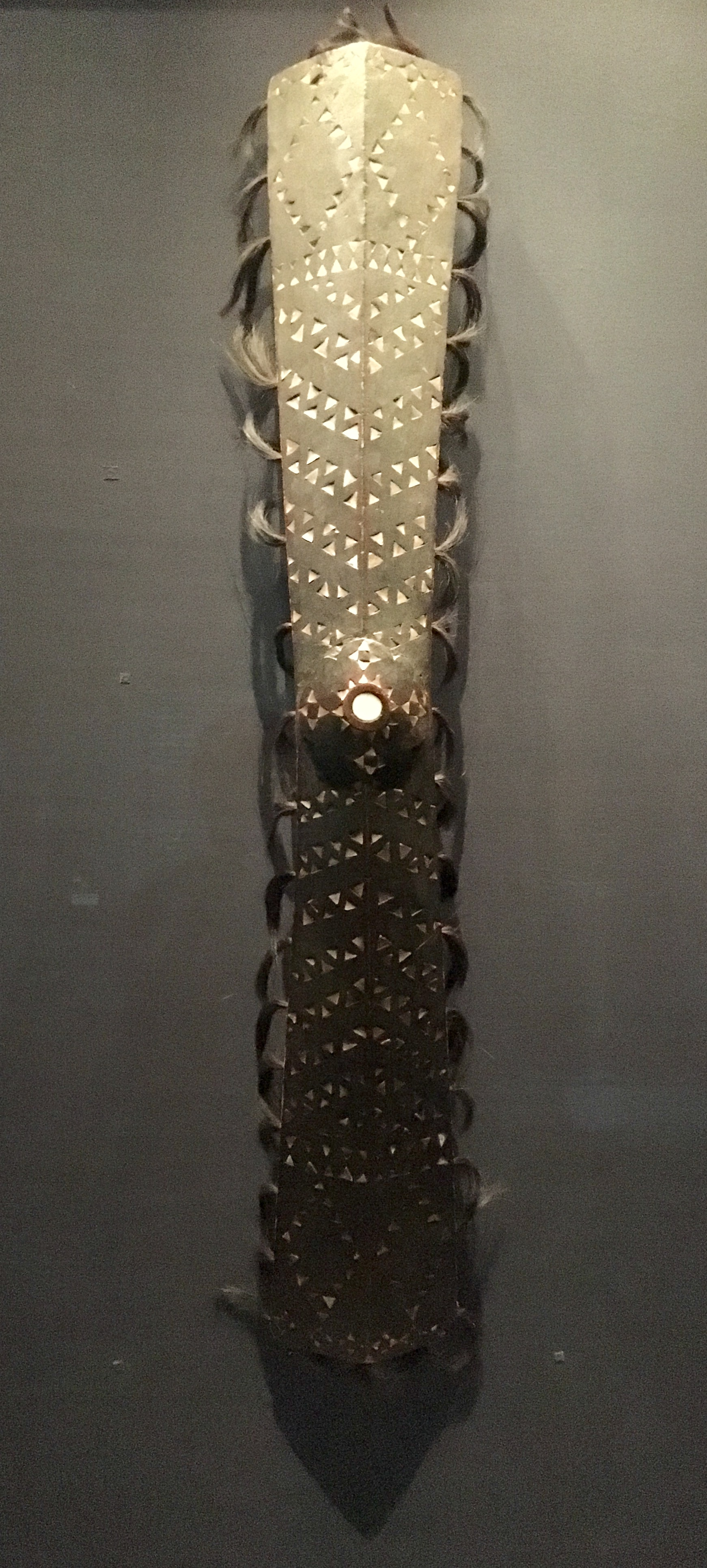
A 17th–19th century salawaku from Halmahera, housed at Singapore’s Asian Civilisations Museum. This specimen is made from wood, nacre, porcelain, and hair.

== Description ==
The Salawaku is a long hour-glass shaped shield. The shield, including the handle, is carved from a single piece of wood. The upper and lower part are broad, and the shield is thinnest in the middle. At the front, it is rounded or has a slight V-shape so that the centre part comes to the foreground. The shield is slightly curved from top to bottom. On the rear, an elevated rib can be seen along the entire length, part of which is the handle in the middle. The front of the Salawaku is painted black using soot and plant juice. It is inlaid with mother-of-pearl and fragments of earthenware, and/or painted with kakean symbols (used by a secret society) and other ornaments; these materials often hint at the foreign aspect of the shields. The shield forms a 'body', and the inlaid patterns refer to certain bodily parts. The upper segment refers to the head, and the lower part to the feet. Arteries run lengthwise. The elevated rib on the rear side represents the spine and, just below the handle, the larynx. Inlays just above the centre represents the eyes. Their number allegedly refers to the number of enemies killed by the ancestors. The shield must be shorter than two arms’ length, in order to avoid the shield's end, and held against the chin to avoid tears falling on the shield, as 'courage and sadness must be separated.'

== Use ==
The term Salawaku means 'protection' and 'repellence': a reference to the supernatural protection of the ancestors; or 'to miss and to catch'. With this technique the defender catches his adversary's weapon, secures it in the wooden shield and then disarms him. The shield is not only a defensive weapon, but thanks to its peculiar, narrow shape may be easily moved to deliver blows with the sharp rims and corners.

== Cultural ==
The Salawaku may be part and parcel of the bridegroom's marriage gifts and are worn during the Cakalele (war dance) or the Hoyla (war dance during the marriage ceremony among the Tobelorese people). During the Cakalele, the Salawaku is carried in the left hand and with a spear or sword in the other. Whereas in the Hasa dance which is only performed by men, who carry the Salawaku on the left hand and a wooden machete, Barakas on the other.

== See also ==
- Kurabit
