= West Halmahera Regency =

Regency in North Maluku, Indonesia

West Halmahera Regency Kabupaten Halmahera Barat
- Regency
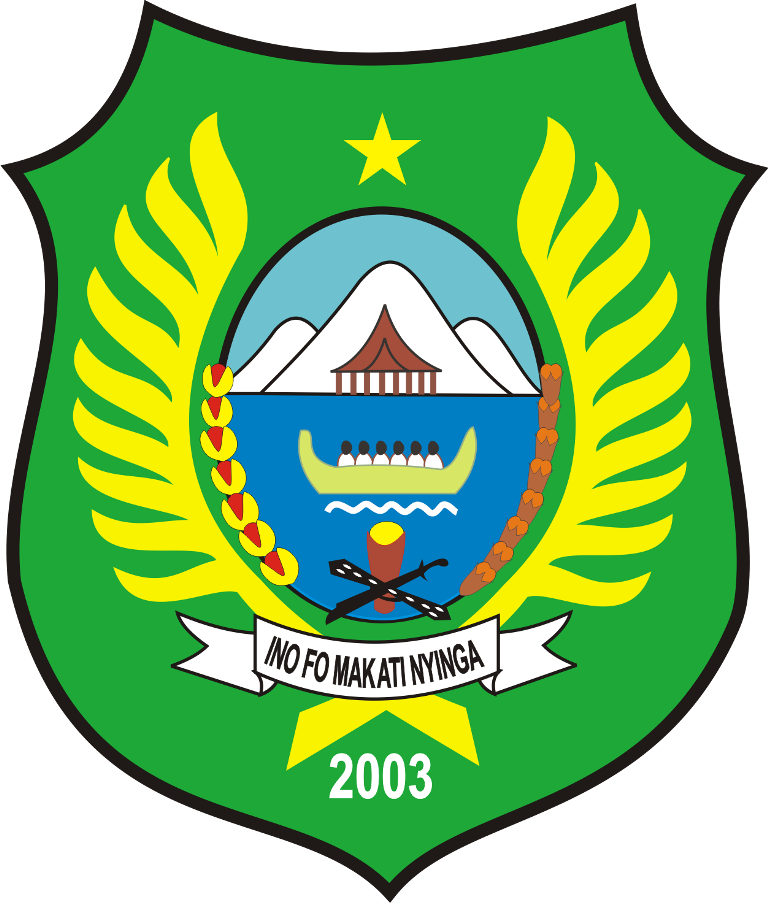
- Coat of arms
- Motto: Ino Fo Makati Nyinga

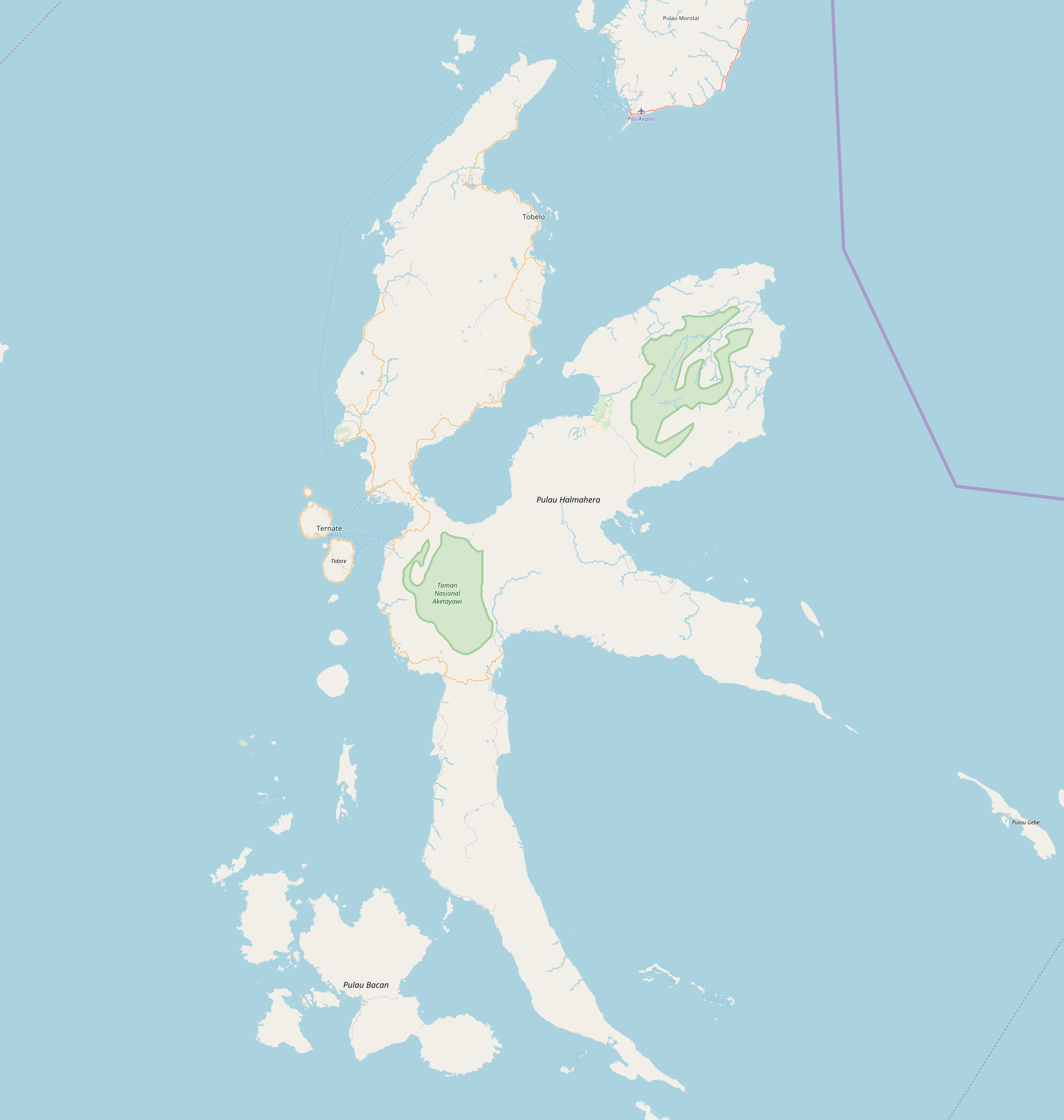
- Location in Maluku, Halmahera and Indonesia West Halmahera Regency (Halmahera) West Halmahera Regency (Indonesia)
- Coordinates: 1.4171°N 127.5526°E
- Country: Indonesia
- Province: North Maluku
- Capital: Jailolo

Government
  - Regent: James Uang
  - Vice Regent: Djufri Muhamad

Area
  - Total: 2,239.11 km^{2} (864.53 sq mi)

Population (mid 2025 estimate)
  - Total: 141,056
  - Density: 62.9965/km^{2} (163.160/sq mi)
- Time zone: UTC+9 (IEST)
- Area code: (+62) 922
- Website: halbarkab.go.id

West Halmahera Regency (Indonesian: Kabupaten Halmahera Barat) is a regency (on Halmahera Island) in North Maluku Province of Indonesia. The regency was created on 25 February 2003 from the western districts of the former North Maluku Regency, and is now bounded by North Halmahera Regency to the north and east, while to the south it borders both East Halmahera Regency and that portion of the city of Tidore on the mainland of Halmahera. It covers an area of 2,239.11 km^{2}, and it had a population of 100,424 people at the 2010 Census and 132,349 at the 2020 Census; the official estimate as of mid-2025 was 141,056 (comprising 72,309 males and 68,747 females). The capital lies at Jailolo (town).

== Administration ==
At the time of the 2020 Census the regency was divided into eight districts (kecamatan), but a ninth district - Loloda Tengah - has subsequently been created from the northern part of Loloda District. The districts are tabulated below with their areas and their populations at the 2010 Census and 2020 Census, together with the official estimates as of mid-2025. The table also includes the locations of the district administrative centres, the number of administrative villages (all classed as rural desa) in each district, and their postal codes.

Kode Wilayah	Name of District (kecamatan)	English name	Area in km^{2}	Pop'n Census 2010	Pop'n Census 2020	Pop'n Estimate mid 2025	Admin centre	No. of villages	Post codes
82.01.05	Jailolo Selatan ^{(a)}	South Jailolo	221.01	14,144	24,409	25,265	Domato	22	97751
82.01.01	Jailolo	(North); Jailolo	305.60	27,541	34,757	38,145	Acango	34	97752
82.01.04	Sahu	(West); Sahu	125.87	9,223	11,842	12,706	Susupu	19	97753
82.01.09	Sahu Timur	East Sahu	266.29	8,015	11,066	11,696	Akelamo	18	97758
82.01.08	Ibu Selatan	South Ibu	375.38	10,335	15,004	15,849	Talaga	16	97756
82.01.03	Ibu	(Central); Ibu	114.62	9,351	12,280	13,158	Tongute Sungi	17	97754
82.01.07	Tabaru	North Ibu	207.97	7,773	9,335	10,249	Duono	16	97757
82.01.02	Loloda ^{(b)}	(South); Loloda	359.02	10,626	13,656	9,262	Kedi	27	97755
82.01.10	Loloda Tengah ^{(b)}	Central; Loloda	177.28	^{(c)}	^{(c)}	4,730	Barataku	^{(c)}	97755
	Totals		2,239.11	100,424	132,349	141,056	Jailolo	169	

Notes: (a) including 37 offshore islands.
(b) including 80 offshore islands in Loloda and Loloda Tengah Districts together. The largest islands are Nusa Kahatola (west of Kedi village) and Sidua .
(c) included in the figure for Loloda District, of which it was formerly a part.

== Demography ==
Most inhabitants speak languages of the North Halmahera language family, including (from south to north) the Sahu, Waioli, Gamkonora and Ibu languages, and the less closely related Lolodarese in the north, who are more ethno-linguistically aligned with the Loloda and Galela groups in North Halmahera Regency.
