= Tobelo language =

North Halmahera language spoken in Indonesia

Tobelo
- Native to: Indonesia
- Region: North Halmahera; North Morotai
- Ethnicity: Tobelo people
- Native speakers: (30,000 cited 2000)
- Language family: West Papuan?: North Halmahera; Northern; Mainland; Tobelo–Tugutil; Tobelo

Language codes
- ISO 639-3: Either: tlb – Tobelo tuj – Tugutil
- Glottolog: tobe1252 Tobelo tugu1246 Tugutil
- ELP: Tobelo
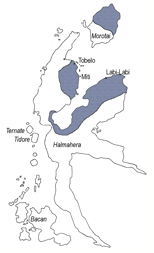
- The Tobelo–Tugutil speaking region (grey) on Halmahera

Tobelo (Indonesian: bahasa Tobelo) is a North Halmahera language spoken on the eastern Indonesian island of Halmahera and on parts of several neighboring islands. The Tobelo-speaking heartland is in the six administrative districts (Indonesian: kecamatan) of Tobelo, located on the western shore of Kao Bay and forming the central part of Halmahera Utara Regency. Other Tobelo speaking areas are the five districts of Wasile (the northwestern half of East Halmahera Regency; where they are actually speakers of the Tugutil language which is very related to Tobelo) on the south and east coast of Kao Bay, and the northern half of Morotai Island. The district capital, also known as Tobelo, serves as a regional commercial and administrative center and is the largest settlement on Halmahera.

== Dialects ==
Six principal dialects are generally recognized (Voorhoeve 1988):

- Heleworuru
- Boeng
- Dodinga
- Lake Paca
- Kukumutuk
- Popon

The last three dialects are also known as Tugutil. The Tugutil varieties may include additional dialectal variants, but this has not been satisfactorily documented (Voorhoeve 1988). Intelligibility is not great (Ethnologue).

In addition, based on cognition percentages in a basic vocabulary list, Voorhoeve 1988 identifies five other North Halmaheran language varieties as dialects of the putative Northeast Halmaheran language. Together with Tobelo, these varieties are Galela, Loloda, Modole, Pagu, and Tabaru. Most speakers consider these to be distinct languages from Tobelo, although they do acknowledge a certain degree of mutual intelligibility.

== Phonology ==
=== Consonants ===
		Bilabial	Alveolar	Palatal	Velar	Glottal
Nasal		m	n	ɲ	ŋ	
Plosive/ Affricate	voiceless	p	t	(tʃ)	k	
Plosive/ Affricate	voiced	b	d	dʒ	ɡ	
Fricative		(f)		ɕ		h
Liquid	lateral		l	ʎ		
Liquid	rhotic		r			
Semivowel		w		(j)		

Consonant sounds in parentheses only occur in loan words or in other Tobelo dialects.

=== Vowels ===
==== Tobelo ====
	Front	Central	Back
Close	i		u
Mid	e~ɛ		o
Open		a	

Mid front vowels can range from /e/ to /ɛ/.

==== Togutil ====
	Front	Central	Back
Close	i		u
Close-mid	e		o
Low-mid	ɛ		ɔ
Near-open	æ		
Open		a	

== Directionals ==
Most all of the 50 languages of Maluku have some sort of directional system. At the least the up/down distinction seems to be an areal feature. But this brings up the chicken and the egg phenomenon. Is this directional system of AN or NAN origin? Or is it a mixture?

Perhaps it is not a coincidence that the Tobelo are the most widespread ethnic group in Maluku, with sizable emigrant population throughout the province. We can a least be sure that the Malay directionals are the "egg", because Malay as spoken in Western Indonesia does not use these directionals whereas Moluccan Malay uses direct calques of the Tobelo terms:

bawah, atas, darat, laut.

Tobelo directionals are described in Taylor (1984). Tobelo directional adverbs occur:

1. on motion verbs to specify direction of motion
2. on nouns to specify motion away from or toward an object

Thus, interpretation of directional adverbs is entirely context-dependent. For example,

o tau t-oiki
NM house 1AGT-go
'I'm going to the house'

If I meet you landwards of the house, this means that I'm headed inland from my house. If I meet you seawards of the house, then it means I'm headed inland to the house.

Some Tobelo directionals
Deictic	Adverb	
land	dina	-iha
sea	dai	-oko
up	daku	-ilye
down	dau	-uku
over	doka	-ika

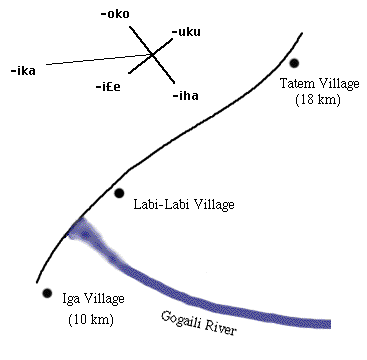
Directionals in Tobelo, including village names near the Gogaili river
