= Desa Gamtala =

- Village
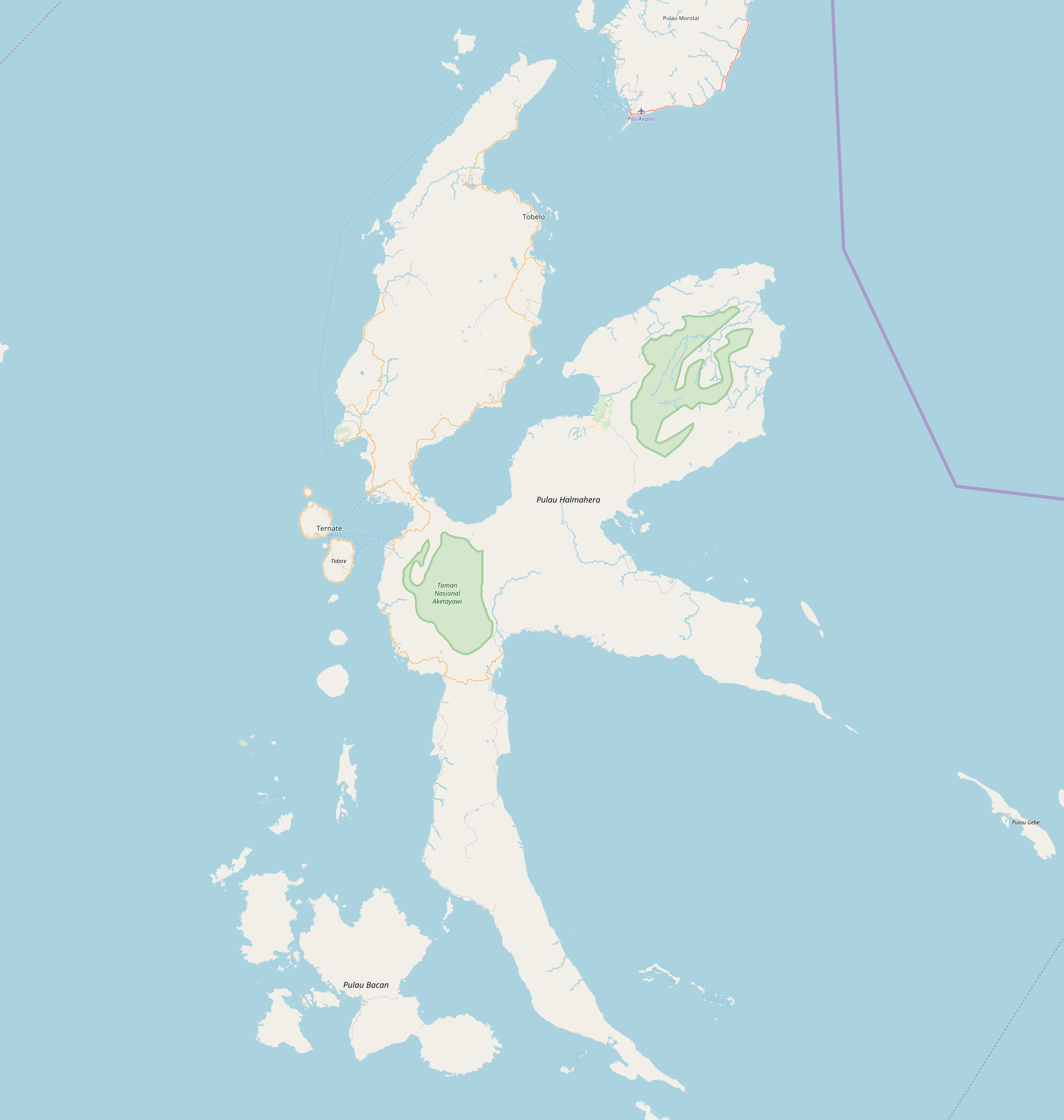
- Location within Halmahera
- Coordinates: 1.110204°N 127.436235°E
- Country: Indonesia

Desa Gamtala is a village located in West Halmahera Regency of North Maluku, Indonesia.

Gamtala is a tourists village in Jailolo city. Every year people in Jailolo hold a festival called the Jailolo Bay Festival. The festival is held in May.

There are many events. Visitors will learn about local culture, the area's natural potential, its marine sites, and many others.

== People ==
The indigenous peoples are Sahu also Tabaru, Waiyoli and others.

== History ==
Historically, the Sahu wereoriginally named Jio Jepung Malamo but were later renamed Sahu. This name was given to the tribe by the Sultan of Ternate. This name change began when the sangaji (those who rule this tribe) was summoned to the sultan of Ternate. At the time sangaji met with the sultan, is eating suhoor meals he also said in Ternate "Hara jou kane the dawn, so kane tribes golo ngana the ngana Jiko sahu" which means "because you sangaji comes at a time the sultan was eating the meal, then today you will establish a territory and the various sahu. At the time of the Sultanate of Ternate after Baab Mansour Malamo, Sahu tribe has two working groups, namely Tala'i and Pa'disua. Both of these groups have an obligation given by the sultan of Ternate to worship and bring tribute to the Sultanate of Ternate.

== Culture ==
The Jailolo Bay Festival is held every year on May 20. It includes a traditional ceremonial meal attended by tourists and the Regent of West Halmahera.

== Tourism ==
Attractions include hot springs in a mangrove forest, indigenous spices and the chance to meet locals and experience their culture.
