= Waioli =

Waioli may be,

- Waioli language, Indonesia
- Waioli Mission District, Hawaii
