= Obi Islands =

Group of islands in North Maluku, Indonesia

Native name: Kepulauan Obi
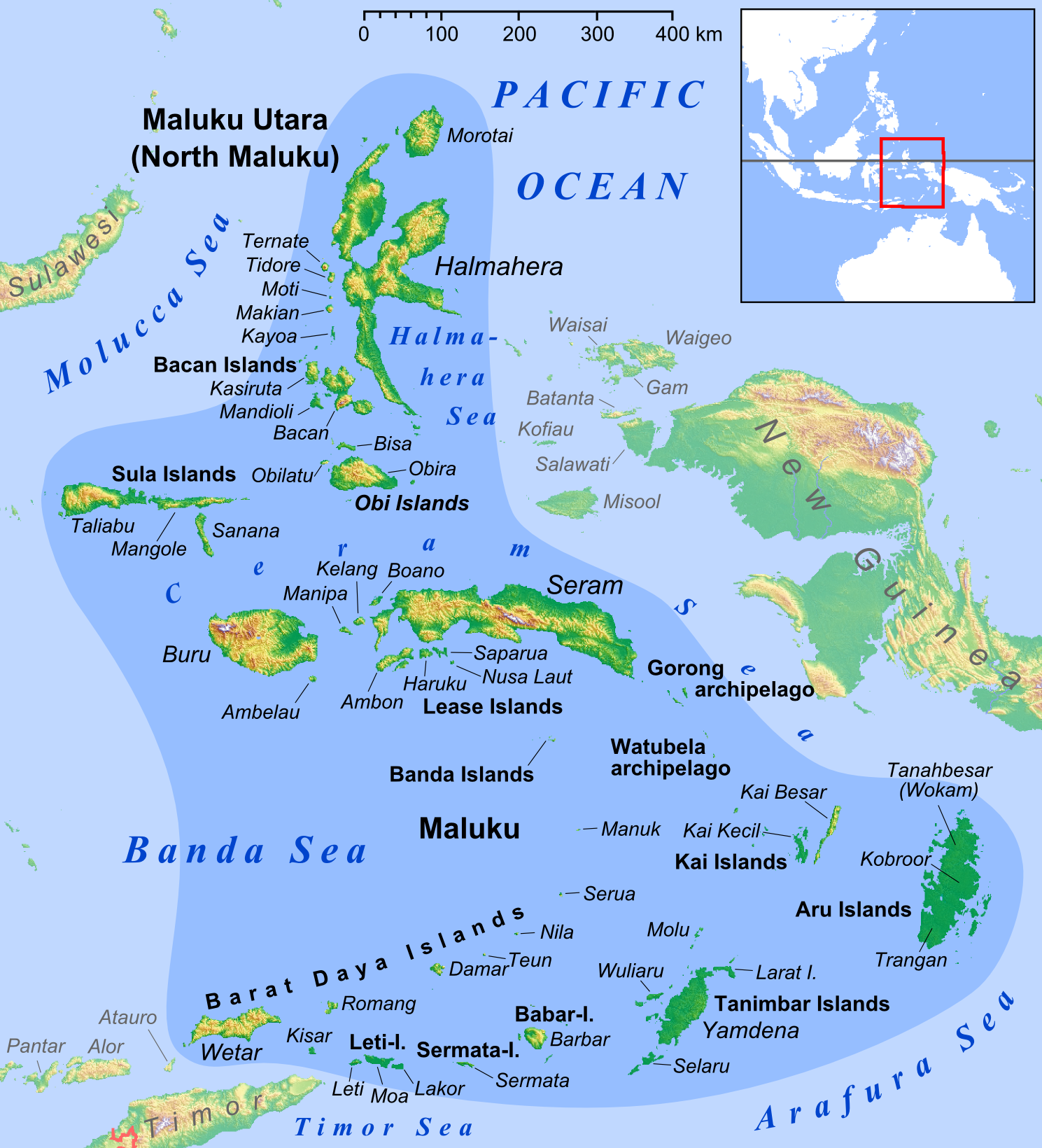

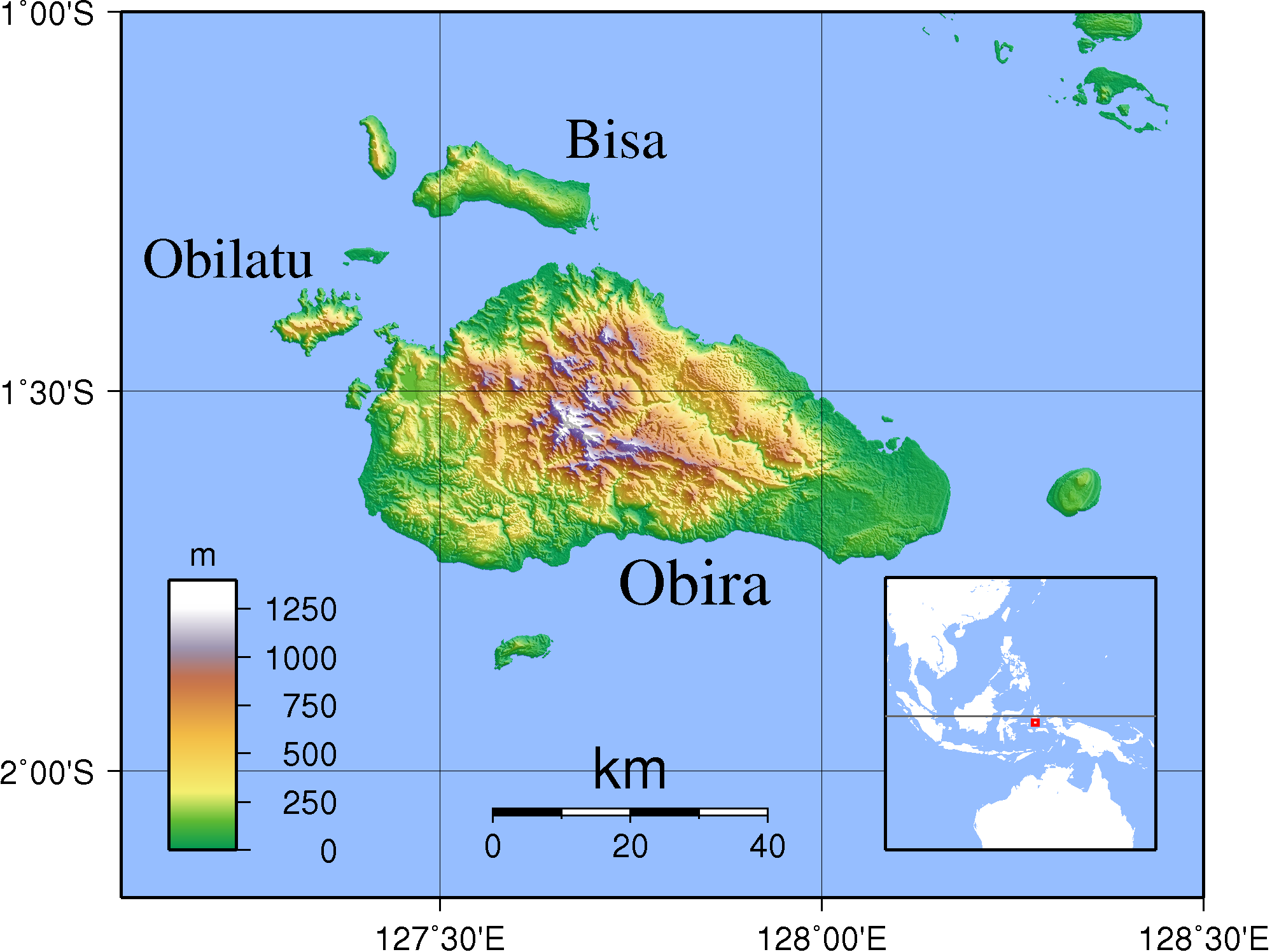

Geography
- Location: Southeast Asia
- Coordinates: 1°30′S 127°45′E
- Major islands: Obi Island

Administration
- Indonesia
- Province: North Maluku
- Regency: South Halmahera

Demographics
- Languages: Galela, Tobelo

Additional information
- Time zone: EIT (UTC+09:00)

The Obi Islands (also known as Ombirah, Indonesian: Kepulauan Obi) are a group of 42 islands in the Indonesian province of North Maluku, north of Buru and Ceram, and south of Halmahera. With a total area of 2,817.72 km^{2}, they had a population of 41,455 at the 2010 Census and 50,760 at the 2020 Census. The official estimate as at mid 2025 was 55,010.

== Geography ==
Obi Island, also called Obira Island, is the largest island in the Obi Islands archipelago. It is surrounded by many smaller islands, including Bisa Island (174.42 km^{2}), Obilatu Island (65.30 km^{2}), Gomumu Island and Pasir Raja, Tapat Island, Belang-belang Island, Tobalai Island, Latu Island, Woka Island, and Tomini Island. Obi Island is bordered by the Maluku Sea to the west, the Seram Sea to the south, and the Obi Strait to the north and east. The major islands closest to it are Bacan Island to the north and Ambon to the south. Obi Island's topography is generally in the form of hills with a short coastline. The hilly surface results in many springs and rivers. Lake Kapi, in the west, is its largest lake. The area was historically abundant in sago and fish.

== History ==
The Obi Islands were an independent kingdom during the 14th century, who were near-equal in importance with the other Malukuan kingdoms (Jailolo, Bacan, Ternate, Tidore), and often intermarried with the family of Ternate. However, at some point Obi became subject to Bacan. A decline in Bacan's population possibly caused the transfer of Obi's population to Bacan, which left the islands uninhabited by the mid-17th century.

On 9 May 1682, Obi, Obilatu, Gomumu, Tapat, and Bisa were sold by the Sultan of Bacan to the VOC for 620 rijksdaalder. The islands became a center for the Tobelo chiefs, and many Tobelo and Galela people moved to the islands. In 1876, the islands were declared government property.

== Administration ==
The Obi Islands are part of South Halmahera Regency. The archipelago is directly bordered by the rest of North Maluku Province to the north and west, by Maluku Province in the south and by West Papua Province in the east. The total area of the main island is about 2,500 square kilometres (970 mi^{2}). Obi Island and the surrounding small islands are divided into five administrative districts (kecamatan), which are sub-divided into 34 administrative villages (desa and kelurahan), with villages further subdivided into hamlets. Of the five districts, three comprise the main Obi Island, although each district also includes neighbouring smaller islands - Obi District includes the southern part of Bisa Island to the north of Obi Island, Obi Timur District includes Tobalai Island to the east, and Obi Selatan Island also includes Gomumu Island and Pasir Raja to the south. The other two districts include no part of Obi Island; Obi Barat District includes Obilatu and Belang-belang Islands to the west of Obi Island, together with the southern part (Tapa desa) of Tapat Island, while Obi Utara District includes the main part of Bisa Island to the north of Obi Island, together with the northern part (Pasir Putih desa) of Tapat Island.

== Demographics ==
The population of the Obi Islands Group was 55,010 people in mid 2025, with a population density of about 19.5 people per square kilometre. All inhabitants on the Obi Island are migrants, as these islands had no indigenous population. The first groups to settle on Obi Island were the Butonese and Tobelo–Galela, followed by immigrants of ethnicity Ternate, Tidore, Bacan, Makian, Kayoa, Buginese, and Javanese. Almost all of the residents are scattered along the coast with the highlands mostly uninhabited jungle. However, there are some worker settlements in hilly areas which have mines and temporary settlements for clove farmers used during clove harvesting season. Infrastructure, especially in terms of modern medical facilities, is lacking.

The languages spoken on the islands are Galela and Tobelo, which belong to the West Papuan language family. Apart from that, languages from the Austronesian language family include Muna–Buton (consisting of many languages), Buginese, and Javanese. The languages used as lingua franca are North Moluccan Malay and Indonesian.

== Villages ==
The five districts are sub-divided into villages (rural desa and urban kelurahan), listed below with their areas and their populations at the 2020 Census and according to the official estimates for mid 2023. The administrative centres of the five districts are denoted by asterisks.

Kode Wilayah	Name	Area in km^{2}	Pop'n Census 2020	Pop'n Estimate mid 2023
82.04.05.2005	Loleo	11.14	1,038	892
82.04.05.2004	Mano	12.03	2,712	2,757
82.04.05.2007	Sologi	118.40	3,145	3,258
82.04.05.2001	Wayaloar *	199.54	3,263	3,231
82.04.05.2002	Fluk	142.54	322	1,584
82.04.05.2003	Bobo	296.36	166	1,982
82.04.05.2009	Ocimaloleo	157.78	743	753
82.04.05.2008	Gambaru	83.23	789	842
Totals South Obi	Obi Selatan	1,021.02	12,178	15,299
82.04.06.2006	Anggai	45.18	2,310	2,084
82.04.06.2005	Sambiki	68.58	2,374	2,514
82.04.06.2004	Jikotamo	76.03	3,147	3,345
82.04.06.2001	Laiwui *	44.32	2,294	2,469
82.04.06.2003	Buton	14.16	1,531	1,629
82.04.06.2002	Baru	371.37	2,368	2,623
82.04.06.2020	Akegula	27.66	1,024	1,120
82.04.06.2021	Kawasi	133.79	4,533	1,281
82.04.06.2014	Air Mangga Indah	129.50	957	1,002
Totals Obi District	Obi	910.59	20,538	18,067

Kode Wilayah	Name	Area in km^{2}	Pop'n Census 2020	Pop'n Estimate mid 2023
82.04.28.2004	Manatahan	17.71	1,271	1,438
82.04.28.2003	Jikohai *	10.87	1,543	1,725
82.04.28.2001	Alam Kenanga	12.20	323	287
82.04.28.2005	Soa Sangaji	17.32	563	709
82.04.28.2002	Alam Pelita	16.54	978	938
82.04.28.2006	Tapa	14.55	533	607
Totals West Obi	Obi Barat	89.19	5,211	5,704
82.04.29.2002	Sum *	184.60	1,521	1,689
82.04.29.2001	Kelo	180.40	698	745
82.04.29.2003	Susepe	49.20	233	278
82.04.29.2004	Wooi	222.00	1,253	1,328
Totals East Obi	Obi Timur	636.23	3,705	4,040
82.04.30.2006	Pasir Putih	14.10	1,138	1,337
82.04.30.2001	Cap	24.50	828	875
82.04.30.2003	Galala	31.90	684	778
82.04.30.2004	Madapolo Barat (West Madapolo)	21.10	1,820	2,009
82.04.30.2002	Madapolo *	19.70	2,460	2,592
82.04.30.2007	Madapolo Timur (East Madapolo)	29.90	1,335	1,518
82.04.30.2005	Waringi	19.50	863	963
Totals North Obi	Obi Utara	160.69	9,128	10,072

== Economy ==
The dominant plantation products in the Obi Islands are cloves, nutmeg, coconut, and pepper. The main economic potential of the islands s in the mining sector. The island has resources of gold, coal, nickel, cement, and petroleum. In 2016, provincial governor Abdul Ghani Kasuba successfully negotiated for the China-based Jinchun Group to build a 620 million dollar nickel smelter on the main island.

Some mining companies in this islands are:

- Halmahera Persada Lygend
- Halmahera Jaya Feronikel
- Megah Surya Pratiwi
- Trimegah Bangun Persada
- Wanatiara Persada
