= Obi (island) =

Island in North Maluku, Indonesia

- Location within Maluku

Geography
- Location: South East Asia
- Coordinates: 1°30′S 127°45′E
- Archipelago: Obi Islands
- Area: 2,542 km^{2} (981 sq mi)

Administration
- Indonesia
- Province: North Maluku

Demographics
- Population: 29,642 (2010)

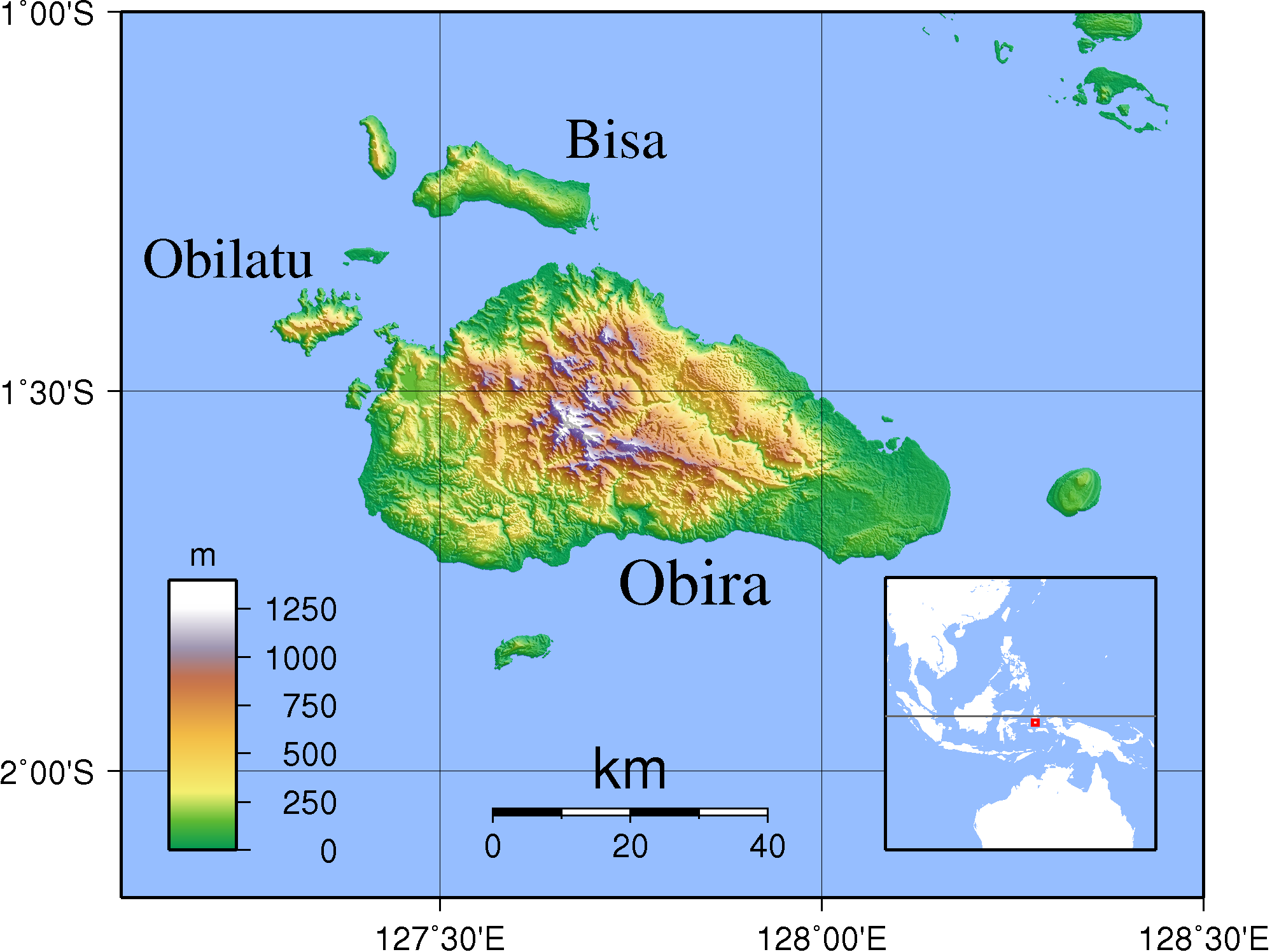
Topography of Obira

Obi (also called Obira) is the main island in the Obi Islands group of Indonesia, south of the larger Halmahera in North Maluku. Its area is 2,542 km². Obi is the largest island located in the Obi Islands group. Obi Island is surrounded by many smaller islands, including Obilatu Island, Bisa Island, Gata-gata Island, Latu Island, Woka Island, and Tomini Island.

Obi Island is bordered by the Molucca Sea to the west, the Seram Sea to the south, and the Strait of Malacca to the north and east. The larger nearby islands are Bacan Island in the north and Seram Island to the south. The topography of Obi Island is generally hilly with a short coastline. This hilly terrain provides the island with numerous springs and rivers that originate in the hills. Additionally, on the western side of Obi Island lies Lake Karo, the largest lake on the island.

Obi Island is part of South Halmahera Regency. Administratively, Obi Island directly borders Maluku Province to the south and West Papua Province to the east. According to the 2010 South Halmahera in Figures data, the area of Obi Island reaches 3,048 square kilometers. Obi Island and the surrounding smaller islands are divided into several subdistricts, each of which is further divided into villages led by village heads. The lowest level of government is the hamlet, headed by the hamlet chief.

The island is eponymous to the Obi Island Birdwing, an endemic species of butterfly. Extensive logging on the island has reduced its habitat, making the species' conservation a concern.

== Administration ==
Obi Island is part of South Halmahera Regency. Administratively, Obi Island directly borders Maluku Province to the south and West Papua Province to the east. Total area of Obi Island reaches 3,048 square kilometers. Obi Island and the surrounding smaller islands are divided into several subdistricts, each of which is further divided into villages led by village heads. The lowest level of government is the hamlet, which is headed by a hamlet chief.

== Demography ==
All residents of Obi Island are migrants, as there are no indigenous inhabitants. The first ethnic group to settle on Obi Island was the Tobelo and Galela peoples. Later, other ethnic groups such as the Ternate, Tidore, Makian, Bacan, Butonese, Buginese, Makassarese, and Javanese also settled on the island.

The population of Obi Island is concentrated along the coastline, with no permanent settlements in the highlands. This settlement pattern is due to the early ethnic groups who relied on fishing and farming for their livelihoods. However, there are some settlements in the hilly areas, mainly consisting of mine workers and temporary housing for clove farmers during the harvest season.

== Education ==
According to data from the South Halmahera Regency Government in 2011, the ratio of elementary schools on Obi Island was 35%, the ratio of junior high schools was 36%, and the ratio of senior high schools was 21%. The human resources of the Obi Island community include a number of university graduates who are spread across various regions of North Maluku. The majority of residents pursue undergraduate education in Ternate, Manado, Makassar, and Yogyakarta. In total, there are approximately 1,500 university students originating from Obi Island. Around 59 students completed postgraduate education and graduated by the end of 2011. These graduates came from various fields, including academia, mining, and public administration.

== Health ==
The availability of healthcare facilities and medical personnel on Obi Island remains very limited. There is only one public health center (Puskesmas) equipped with inpatient services. However, its infrastructure does not yet meet the needs for treating certain types of illnesses. There are only two part-time doctors and six paramedical staff, consisting of medical assistants, midwives, and nurses. The lack of facilities and medical personnel results in many diseases going untreated. Access to healthcare services also involves complicated administrative procedures, and patients in need of further care must be referred to Bacan Island via sea transport.

== Economy ==
=== Agriculture ===
Obi Island has abundant natural resource potential in the agricultural sector. The main plantation products are cloves, nutmeg, coconut, and pepper. For every ton of cloves, farmers can earn approximately 70 million rupiahs after deducting harvesting costs.

=== Mining ===
Obi Island, in addition to its natural resource potential in the agriculture sector, also has a strong mining sector. The island holds valuable resources such as gold, coal, nickel, cement, petroleum, and others. This substantial potential directly correlates with Obi Island’s significant contribution to South Halmahera Regency’s revenue.

Currently, several mining companies are operating on Obi Island, including:

- Harita Nickel – nickel ore mining and nickel processing
- PT Wanatiara Persada – nickel ore mining
- PT Obi Putra Mandiri – nickel mining
- PT Mulia Putra Sejahtera – nickel ore mining
- PT Serongga Sumber Lestari – nickel mining
- PT Intim Mining Sentosa – nickel mining
- PT Obi Mayor Nusantara – (not in mining, operates in construction)
- PT Budhi Jaya Mineral – mining and production of limestone
- PT Bela Sarana Permai – mining and production of iron ore

The mining sector on Obi Island plays a vital role in the economy of both South Halmahera Regency and North Maluku Province. Based on data from the Central Bureau of Statistics (BPS), the 2024 Gross Regional Domestic Product (GRDP) of South Halmahera Regency shows that the mining and quarrying sector contributed Rp 3.44 trillion, while the manufacturing sector contributed Rp 11.49 trillion. The manufacturing sector has become the main driver of economic growth in South Halmahera Regency, contributing more than three times the value of the mining sector.

=== Tourism ===
Obi Island offers a variety of natural tourist attractions with strong development potential. However, due to uneven tourism development, many of these attractions are not well-publicized or managed. The island features a diverse range of tourist activities, such as fishing, snorkeling, diving, and other water-based recreation, supported by Obi's rich and relatively preserved marine biodiversity. Some of the notable tourist destinations on Obi include Pantai Merah Putih, Sambiki Island, Dua Island, Santari Island, Kadera Island, Batu Mogimpi, and others.

== See also ==
- List of ultras of the Malay Archipelago
