= Gamkonora language =

North Halmahera language spoken in Indonesia

Gamkonora
- Native to: Indonesia
- Region: Halmahera
- Native speakers: (1,500 cited 1987)
- Language family: West Papuan?: North Halmahera languages; Sahu; Gamkonora

Language codes
- ISO 639-3: gak
- Glottolog: gamk1238

Gamkonora is one of the North Halmahera languages used in West Halmahera. It is spoken in the region around Mount Gamkonora, where its speakers are mostly concentrated.

Gamkonora is closely related to Sahu. They are included in the same branch of the North Halmahera languages.
