= Sahu language =

North Halmahera language spoken in Indonesia

Sahu
- Native to: Indonesia
- Region: Halmahera
- Native speakers: (7,500 excluding Waioli and Gamkonora cited 1987) (12,000 cited in 1987)
- Language family: West Papuan?: North Halmahera; Sahu; Sahu
- Dialects: Waioli; Pa'disua; Gamkonora; Tala'i; Ibu †

Language codes
- ISO 639-3: Either: saj – Sahu ibu – Ibu
- Glottolog: sahu1245 Sahu ibuu1240 Ibu
- ELP: Ibu

Sahu (Sa’u, Sahu’u, Sau) is a North Halmahera language. Use is vigorous; dialects are Pa’disua (Palisua), Tala’i, Waioli, and Gamkonora. A fifth dialect, Ibu, used to be spoken near the mouth of the Ibu River. Ethnologue considers Waioli and Gamkonora to be separate languages.

Sahu has many Ternate loanwords, a historical legacy of the dominance of the Ternate Sultanate in the Moluccas.

== Phonology ==
Sahu, like other North Halmahera languages, is not a tonal language.

=== Consonants ===
Sahu consonant phonemes
		Labial	Alveolar	Palato- alveolar	Palatal	Velar	Glottal
Nasal		m	n		ɲ	ŋ	
Plosive/ Affricate	voiceless	p	t	tʃ		k	ʔ
Plosive/ Affricate	voiced	b	d	dʒ		ɡ	
Plosive/ Affricate	implosive	ɓ	ɗ	ʄ		ɠ	
Fricative		f	s				
Approximant	median	w			j		h
Approximant	lateral		l				
Trill			r				

When preceding /a/, /o/, and /u/, the consonants /d/, /ɗ/, and /l/ become retroflex (/ɖ/, /ᶑ/, and /ɭ/, respectively). The trill /r/ alternates freely with /ɾ/, but, according to Visser and Voorhoeve, /r/ is the more usual allophone. The glottal /h/ may be realized as /χ/ by educated speakers for certain words deriving from Arabic.

=== Vowels ===
Sahu vowel phonemes
	Front	Central	Back
High	i		u
Mid	e	ə	o
Low		a	

The phoneme /ə/ is only found in loans (primarily from Indonesian).
