= Papuan mythology =

The Papuans are one of four major cultural groups of Papua New Guinea. The majority of the population lives in rural areas. In isolated areas, there remains a handful of the giant communal structures that previously housed the whole male population, with a circling cluster of huts for the women. The Papuan people are a Melanesian people composed of at least 240 different peoples, each with its own language and culture. Sago is the staple food of the Papuan supplemented with hunting, fishing, and small gardens.

Papuans may be related to the Iatmul on the Sepik River and to the Asmat and Marind-anim farther west along the coast. There the cultures share concepts of village “big men”, great longhouses, huge dugout canoes, headhunting and, in some areas, cannibalism.

Ancestors are important, but not necessarily revered in Papuan culture. The important quality is called “imunu”, the power that pervades things, including ritual objects. Imunu is personified in the masked ceremonies. Most representations are of humans or ancestors, not plants or animals. Traditional cultural ceremonies on a large scale existed into the 1950s, but declined as Christian missionaries converted the villages.

== Religion ==
Animistic beliefs, as well as ancestor worship, are an important part of the widespread traditional rituals and beliefs of the Papuan culture. The practical aspects of life in the region often speak to the types of deities that are revered or worshipped in said region. For example, farming communities often place great emphasis on the weather, accordingly celebrating aspects of fertility and harvest. Placating the spirits of ancestors is also a dominant theme in traditional beliefs, while the fear of sorcery and witchcraft is widespread. Many religions in post-Missionary Papua New Guinea combine elements of Christianity with these more traditional religious beliefs, to varying degrees.

== Art ==
Papuan art forms are as diverse as they are distinctive. In a country where language varies from village to village, it can be expected that artistic expression will differ in style just as dramatically. Pottery, weapons, carvings, basketwork and musical instruments are produced by different people in different places, according to their traditional skills and beliefs. Most provinces specialize in different kinds of weaponry. Bows and arrows are traditional in several areas. Shields have a decorative and spiritual role just as important as their defensive purposes. Gope boards are believed to possess the spirits of powerful warriors or to act as guardians of the village. Before hunting or war expeditions, the spirits were called upon to advise and protect the men. Storyboards are a modern version of the fragile bark carvings villagers used to make. The boards illustrate incidents of village life in raised relief.

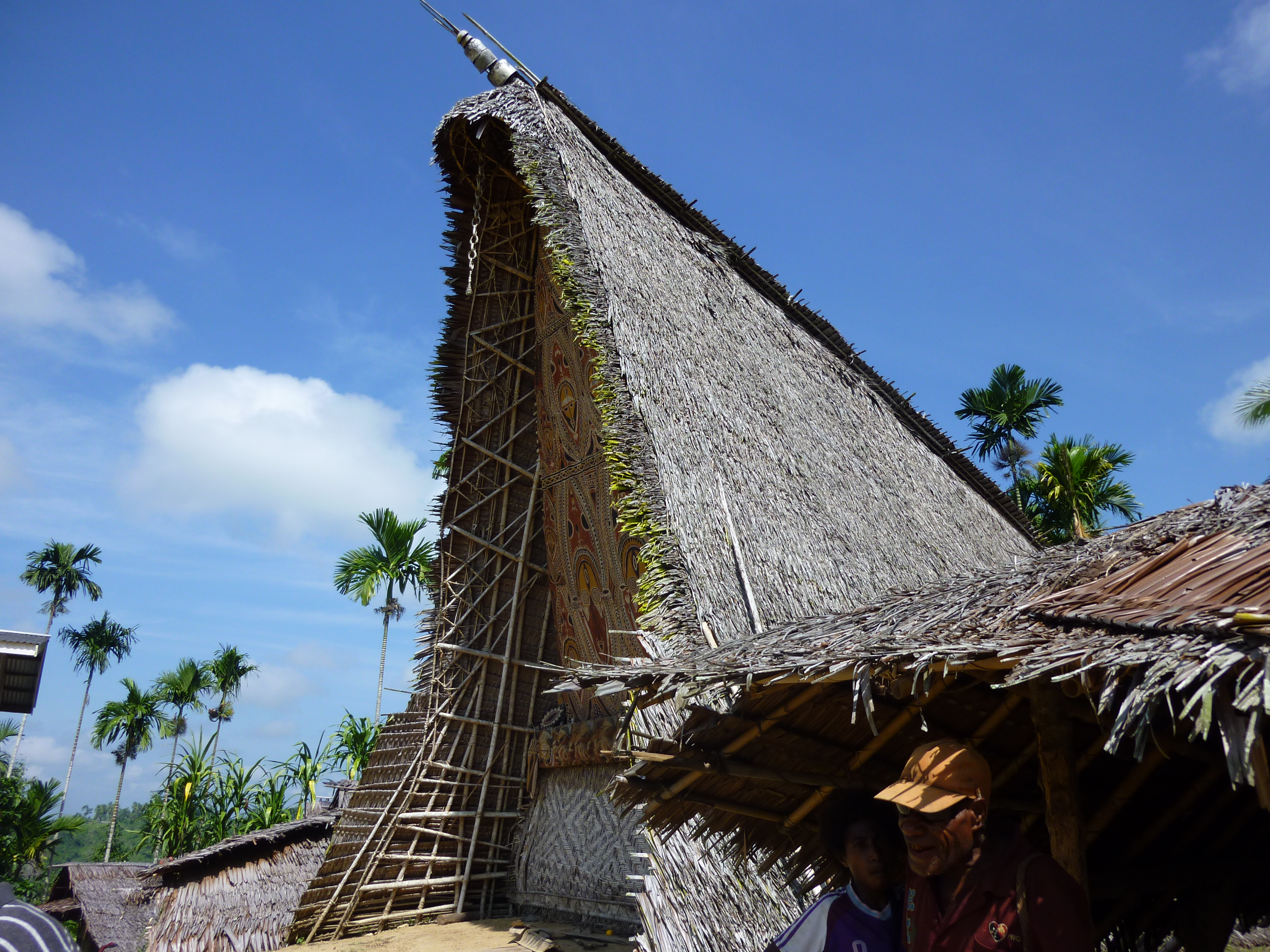
Haus Tambaran in Apangai, Maprik District, East Sepik Province, 2012

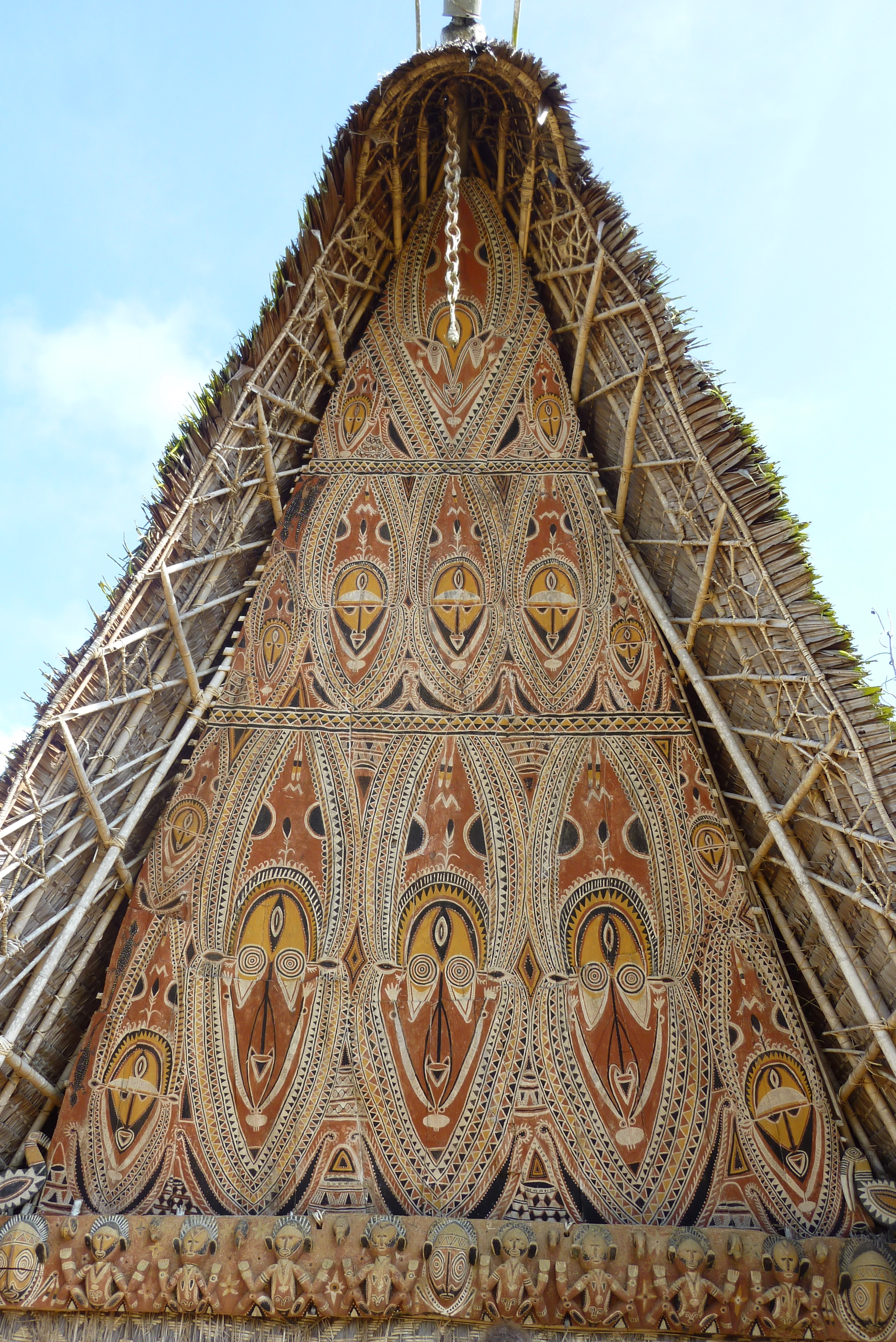
Haus Tambaran, Apangai - gable

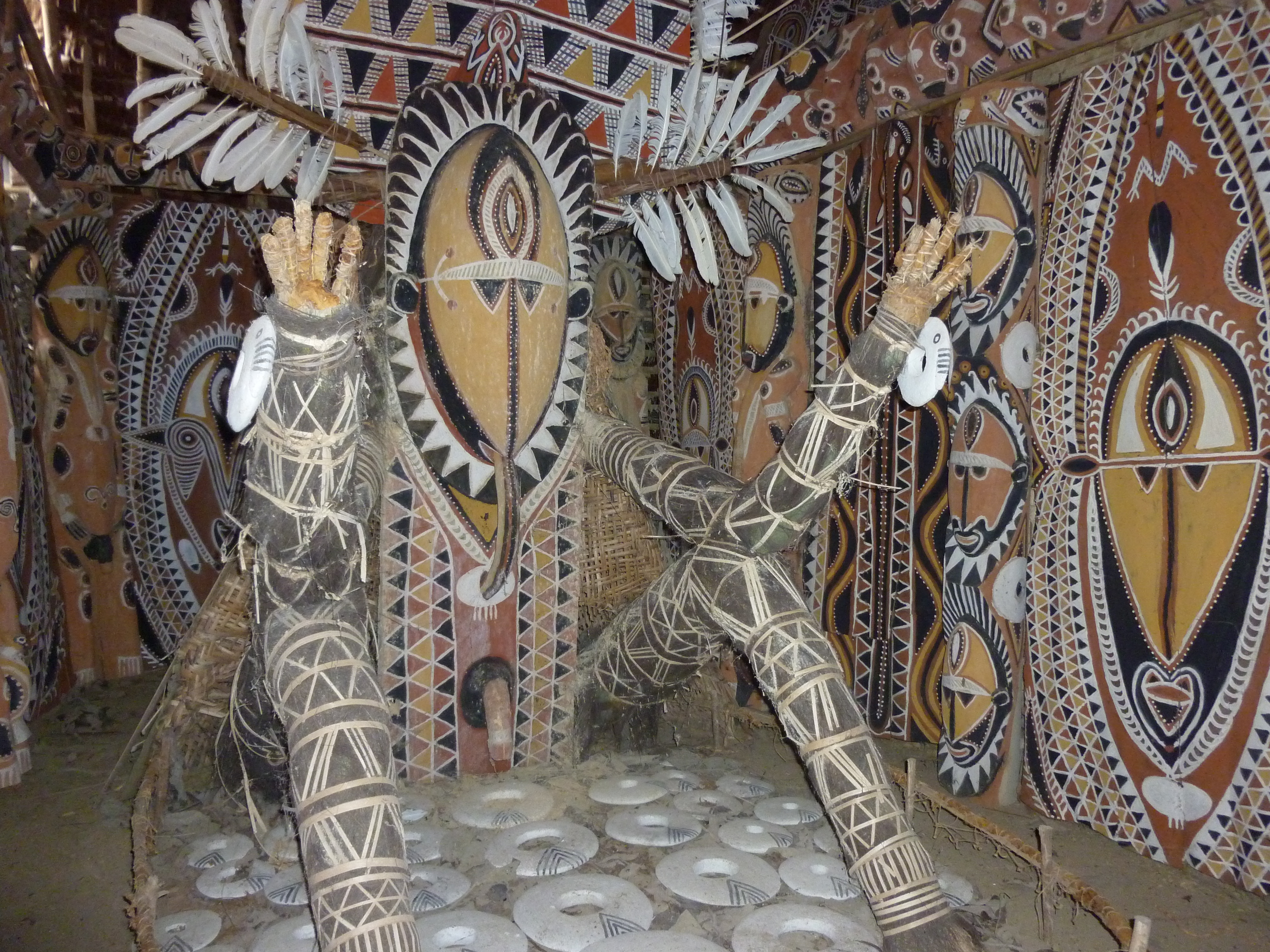
Haus Tambaran, inner space
