= Tongans in Hawaii =

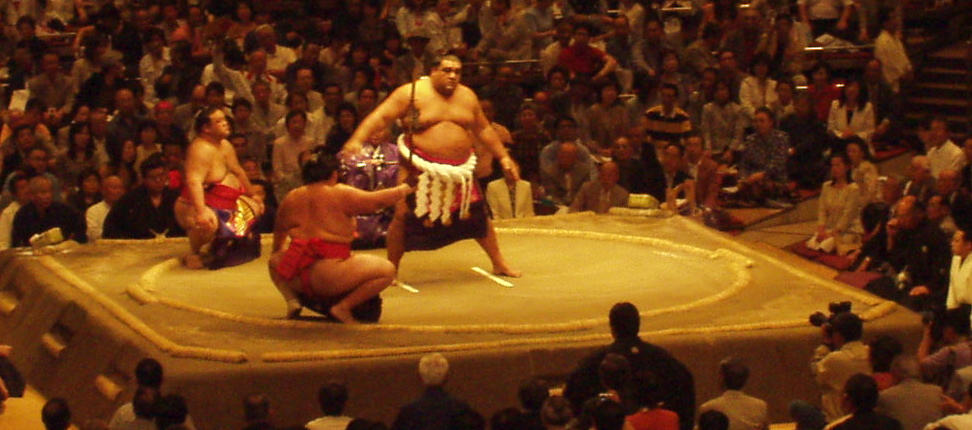
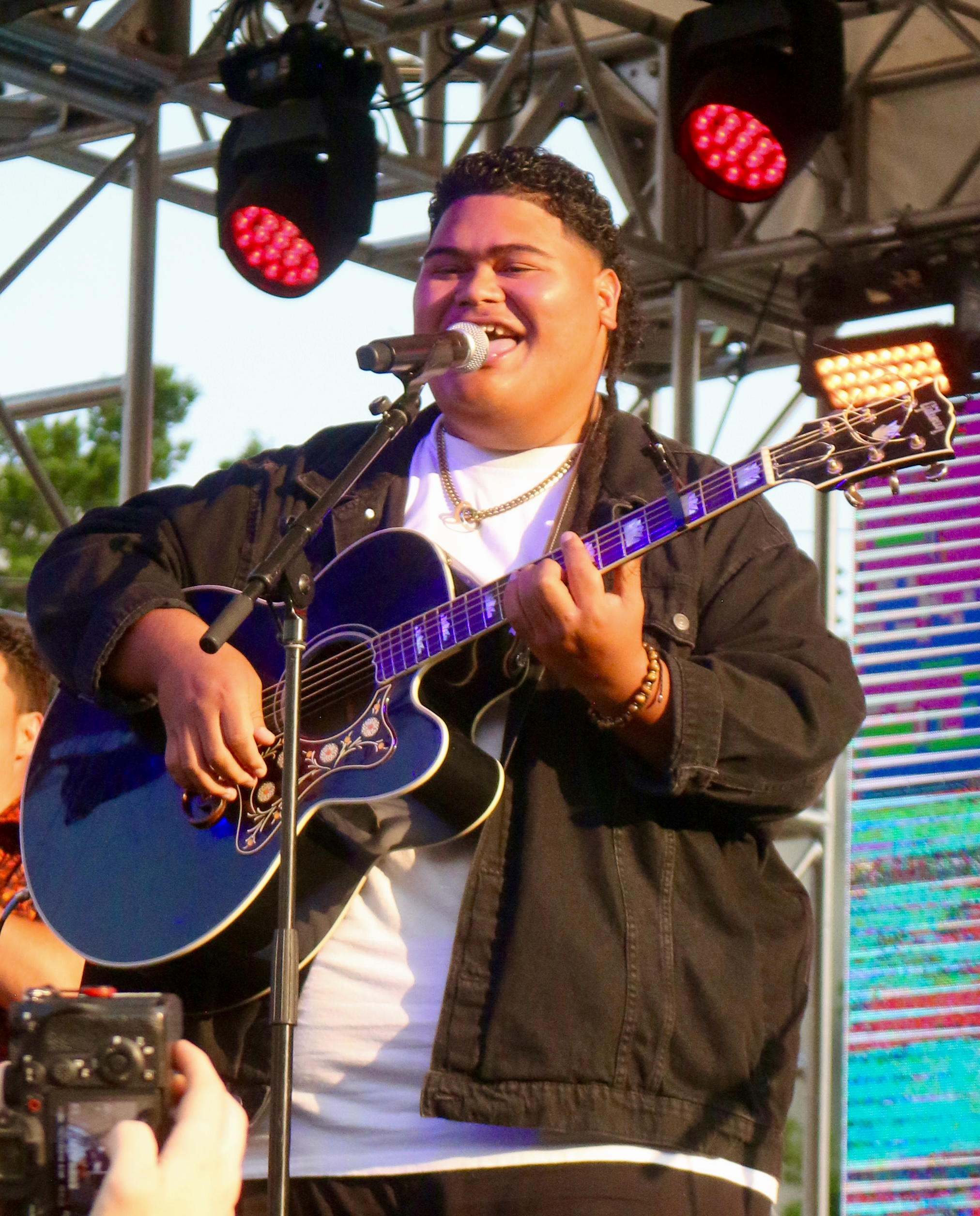
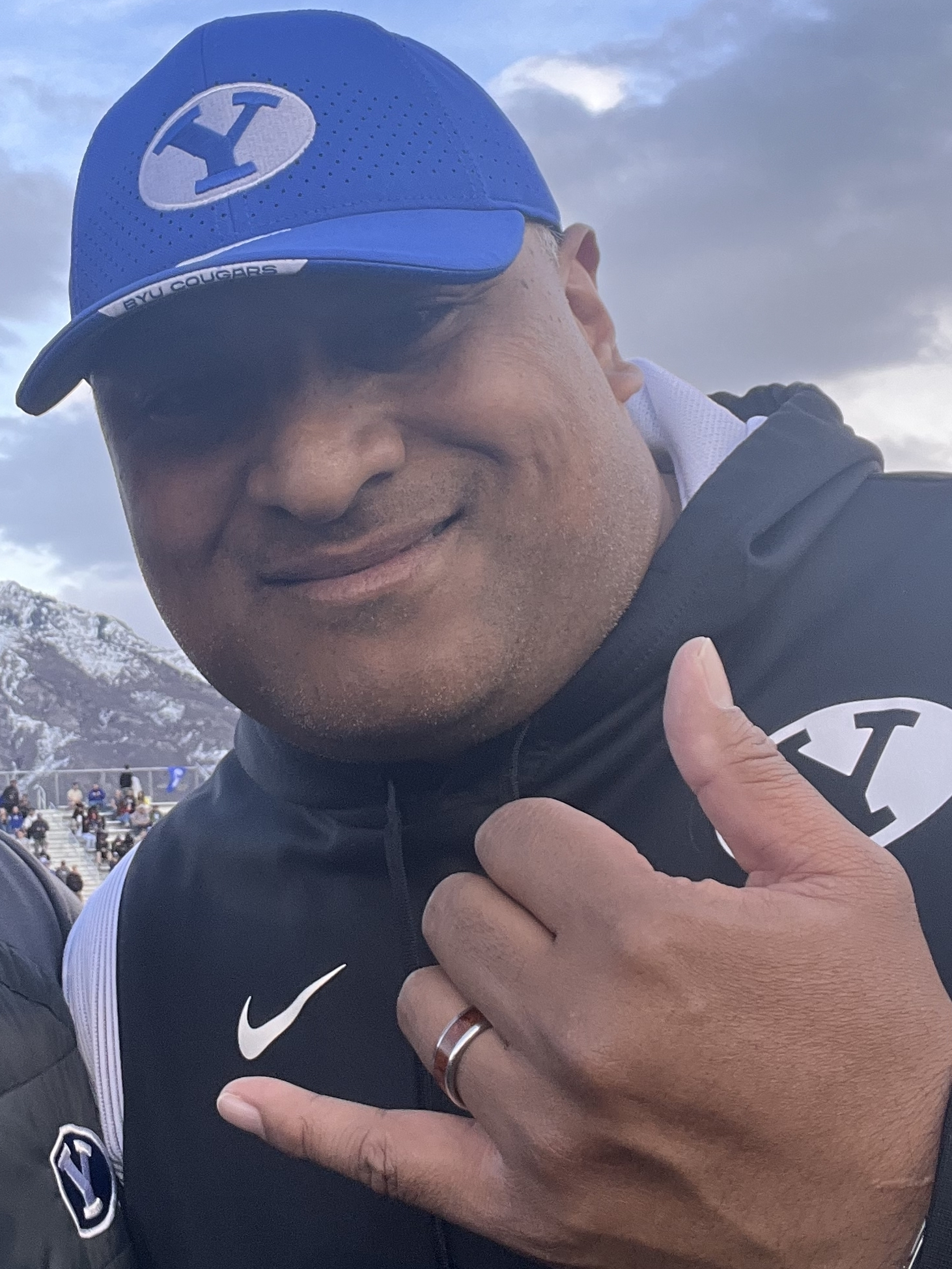
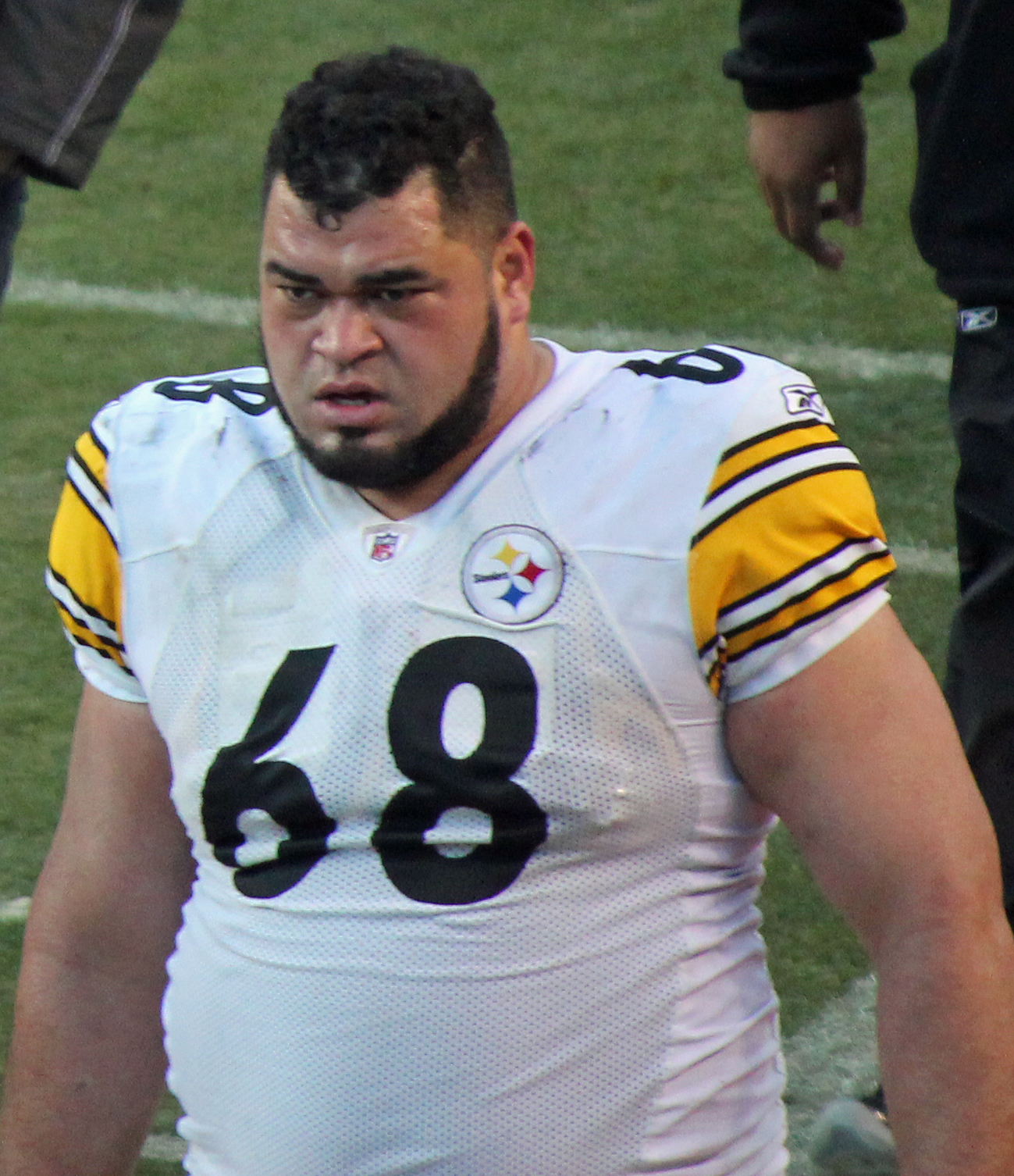
- Top: Tonga dancers (PCC); Musashimaru Kōyō Middle: Iam Tongi; Kalani Sitake Bottom: Chris Kemoeatu; Tonga drum show (PCC)

Languages
- English; Hawaiian Pidgin; Tongan

Religion
- Christianity; Methodism

Related ethnic groups
- Tongans, other Polynesians

Tongans in Hawaii are residents of Hawaii who are of Tongan descent. The Tongan community in Hawaii traces its origins to migration patterns shaped by Tonga’s kinship-based society and historical dynasties, with the first significant settlement in Laie, O'ahu, in 1916. Tongan migration to Hawaii increased during the 20th century as part of broader Pacific labor movements, and continued through changes in U.S. immigration policy.

Tongans in Hawaii have faced challenges including economic hardship, discrimination, limited educational support, and issues of social stratification. The community maintains strong cultural ties to Tonga through remittances, cultural festivals, and support during crises, such as natural disasters and the COVID-19 pandemic.

== History ==
=== Before the 20th century ===
Tongan society is structured by complex kinship and status systems, with historical roots traced back to the first Tu'i Tonga around 950 AD. Over the centuries, power shifted among three royal dynasties: Tu'i Tonga, Tu'i Ha'atakalaua, and Tu'i Kanokupolu, with significant changes in the late 18th and 19th centuries consolidating royal authority. Social rank, inheritance, and kinship continue to influence community organization, ceremonies, and migration patterns, as seen in the ongoing ties between Tonga and its diaspora in places like Hawaii.

Tongan migration to Hawaii took place within the broader context of labor recruitment and social change that began after the first European contact in 1778. Following the overthrow of the Hawaiian Kingdom in 1893 and annexation by the United States in 1898, plantation owners in the 19th and early 20th centuries brought contract laborers from across Asia and the Pacific, including Tongans, to work under harsh conditions enforced by policies like the Masters and Servants Act of 1850.

=== 1900—1999 ===
In 1916, the first Tongan immigrants settled in the town of Laie on the island of Oahu, marking the beginning of the local Tongan community. After the end of World War II, more Tongans arrived in Hawaii. Despite sociologists in the 1920s and 1930s framing Hawai‘i as a melting pot, Tongans and other Pacific Islanders continued to face discrimination and social stratification. Tongan immigration to Hawaii continued into the 1950s, when a few Tongans arrived as students, and some stayed. In the 1950s and 1960s, as tourism promoted an image of racial harmony, Tongans, along with Samoans and Filipinos, still struggled with low incomes and systemic mistreatment, especially in education and justice. Hierarchies between ethnic groups in Hawaii persisted into the territorial era and after Hawai‘i became the fiftieth state in 1959.

During the 1960s, U.S. immigration policy changed, making it easier for Tongans in Hawaii to sponsor the move of family members. This led to the creation of a small Tongan community in Hawaii. Some Tongans helped build the Church of Jesus Christ of Latter-day Saints' Polynesian Cultural Center and portions of Brigham Young University–Hawaii during this period.

Over the following decades, many Tongans who settled in Hawaii moved to the mainland, especially California and later Utah, attracted by affordability, educational opportunities, and family networks. The Tongan community in Hawaii serves as both a cultural center and a starting point for further migration to the mainland United States.

The migration of Tongans into Hawaii is part of a broader Pacific Islander presence in the state, which has been tracked in demographic data since at least the 1990s. In the 1990s, efforts led by advocates like Esther Kiaʻāina resulted in Native Hawaiians being counted separately from Asian people in U.S. federal data. However, all other Pacific Islanders, including Tongans, continued to be grouped in a single category.

=== 2000s—present ===
Tongan families, like many Pacific Islanders in the United States, have often faced educational isolation and a lack of targeted support since at least the early 2000s. Between 2000 and 2010, the Pacific Islander population in the U.S. grew by 40%, reaching about 1.2 million, but many families continued to experience poverty and downward mobility. Studies released in May 2011 and afterward found that less than 20% of Pacific Islanders who took the ACT met all benchmarks, and only 18% of Pacific Islander adults held bachelor’s degrees. As of 2008, the island of Tonga had a population of about 101,000 and relied economically on exports, aid, and remittances from Tongans living abroad, including Hawaii.

The annual Tongan National Day Festival in Hawaii began in 2016 in order to mark the adoption of the Tongan constitution on November the 4th, and to honor their culture. The festival aids in the younger generations of Tongans in Hawaii to connect with their roots, especially for those who have not visited Tonga. The festival brings together both Tongans and non-Tongans to promote cultural understanding and community. As of 2023, Tongans make up 37% of the Hawaiian population and maintain their cultural traditions.

=== Language accessibility in Hawaii ===
In 2001, Hawaii began offering driver’s license exams in several languages to accommodate its diverse immigrant population, with options including Tongan, Samoan, Tagalog, Japanese, Mandarin, Korean, and Vietnamese. After new questions were added to the test, these translated versions, including Tongan, were discontinued.

Complaints about the lack of language access began surfacing in 2013, prompting advocacy groups to push for reinstatement of the translations. In 2014, a federal class-action lawsuit was filed to require the state to once again offer exams in multiple languages, citing the challenges faced by immigrants, including Tongans, in obtaining a driver’s license when the exam is only available in English.

=== COVID-19 Pandemic ===
During the COVID-19 pandemic, especially in August 2020 when Hawaii saw its highest case numbers, Pacific Islanders as a whole were disproportionately affected, making up 24% of cases while only 4% of the population. However, state data did not specify which Pacific Islander groups, such as Tongans, were most impacted.

This lack of specificity led community leaders and health professionals to use indirect methods, like analyzing last names, to identify communities in need. Calls for more detailed data collection remain, so that the distinct needs of groups like Tongans in Hawaii can be recognized and addressed.

Later, the Hawaii State Department of Health collected and analyzed COVID-19 data to assess its impact on Native Hawaiian, Pacific Islander, and Asian populations from March 1, 2020, to February 28, 2021. During this period, they found Pacific Islanders made up 5% of Hawaii’s population but accounted for 22% of COVID-19 cases and deaths, with a high incidence rate of 7,070 cases per 100,000 population. Tongans, who numbered 7,855 in Hawaii, experienced an incidence rate of 2,419 cases per 100,000 and made up 1% of COVID-19 cases. The move to disaggregate data, prompted by community recommendations and implemented by the Department of Health, enabled a clearer picture of disparities among subgroups like Tongans and informed culturally responsive outreach and public health interventions.

=== Reaction to the 2022 Hunga Tonga–Hunga Haʻapai eruption and tsunami ===
In January 2022, the 2022 Hunga Tonga–Hunga Haʻapai eruption and tsunami undersea volcano erupted with extraordinary force, triggering massive tsunamis that devastated several Tongan islands. Approximately 84 percent of the Tongan population was displaced or suffered property and crop losses. As of May 2023, many displaced Tongans continued relying on support from the diaspora, including remittances from relatives in Hawaii.

Wesley United Methodist Church in Kāhala, Hawaii, along with other United Methodist churches in Hawaii, established a Tongan Relief Task Force to send humanitarian aid to Tonga. In addition to church-led efforts, smaller community groups of Tongans in Hawaii, such as kava clubs, began collecting donations of food, water, clothing, and furniture to support those affected. The Kalapu Smart club organized a bingo fundraiser and collection drive to raise money for relief supplies, hoping for help with shipping goods to Tonga.

Due to damaged communication lines, many Tongans in Hawaii could not reach family members in Tonga. This caused distress within the community.
