= North Halmahera languages =

Language family

North Halmahera
- Halmaheran
- Geographic distribution: Maluku Islands, Indonesia
- Linguistic classification: West Papuan or independent language family

Language codes
- Glottolog: nort2923
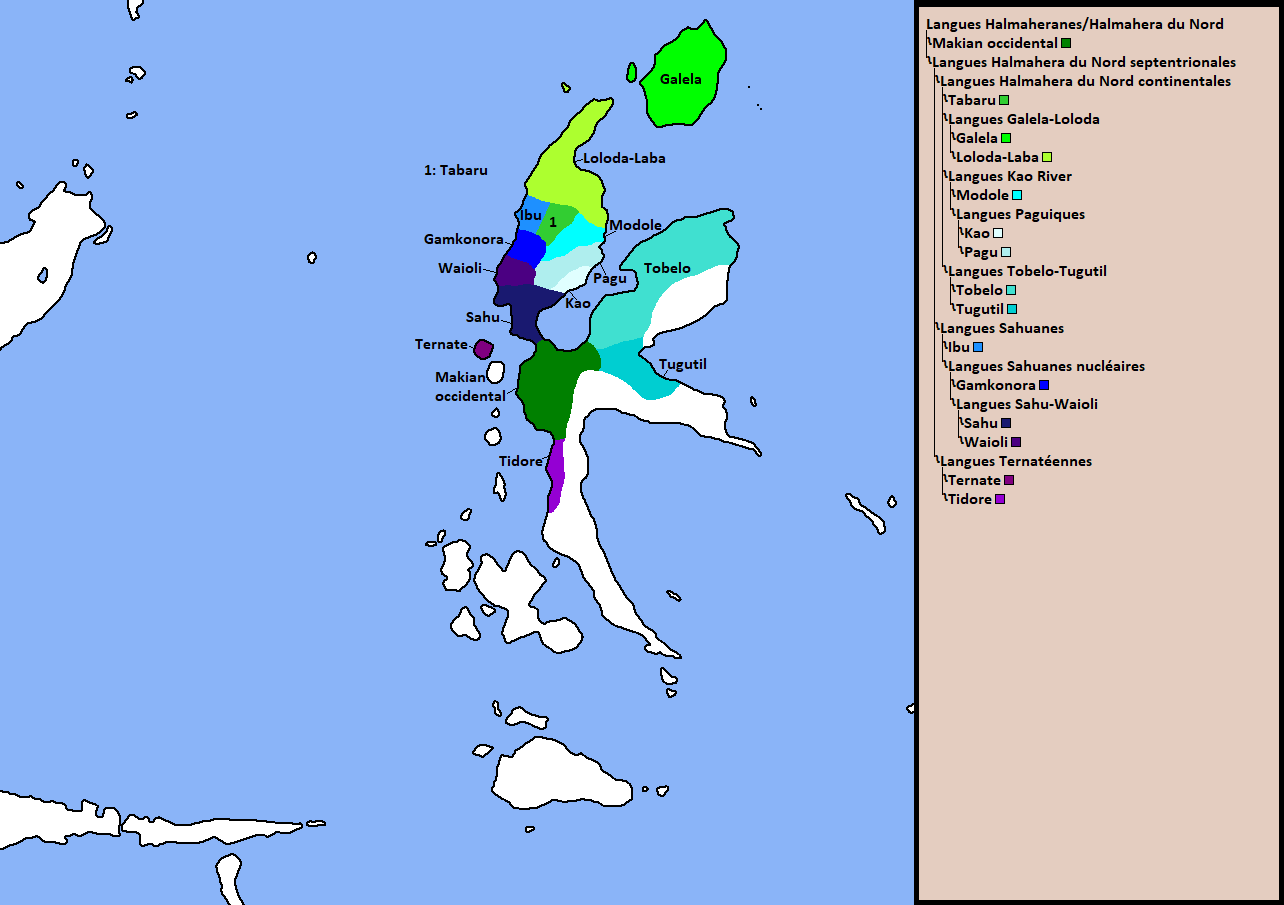
- Map of the North Halmahera languages;

The North Halmahera (NH) languages are a family of languages spoken in the northern and eastern parts of the island of Halmahera and some neighboring islands in Indonesia. The southwestern part of the island is occupied by the unrelated South Halmahera languages, which are a subgroup of Austronesian. They may be most closely related to the languages of the Bird's Head region of West Papua, but this is not well-established.

The best known North Halmaheran language is Ternate (50,000 native speakers), which is a regional lingua franca and which, along with Tidore, were the languages of the rival medieval Ternate and Tidore sultanates, famous for their role in the spice trade.

Most of these languages are very closely related to each other, and their family status is well-demonstrated. West Makian stands out as an isolate. Their external links remain unclear. While genealogically distinct from most languages of Indonesia, they all show evidence of extensive contact with the dominant Austronesian language family.

Some of the North Halmahera languages are characterized by their elaborate morphological structures. Others exhibit deep external influence, having shifted to a more Austronesian-type grammar as a consequence of prolonged contact.

== Genetic and areal relations ==
Spoken in the Maluku Islands, the North Halmahera languages are some of the westernmost Papuan languages (the only other such outlier family in eastern Indonesia being Timor–Alor–Pantar). Located within Southeast Asia, the two families are arguably the only non-Melanesian linguistic groups that can be linked to the Papuan families of Oceania. The languages are thought to have been brought to the region as a result of migration from New Guinea, likely predating the arrival of Austronesian languages.

These languages are classified by some to be part of a larger West Papuan family, along with the languages of the Bird's Head region of Western New Guinea, while others consider NH to form a distinct language family, with no demonstrable relationship outside the region. The languages of North Halmahera appear to have the closest affinity with the languages of the Bird's Head, which suggests a migration from the western Bird's Head to northern Halmahera. However, Ger Reesink notes that the evidence for genetic relatedness between the different "West Papuan" groupings is too skimpy to form a firm conclusion, suggesting that they be considered an areal network of unrelated linguistic families. Moreover, many speakers of NH languages, such as the Ternate, Tidore, and Galela peoples, are physically distinct from New Guineans, while Papuan traits are more prevalent among the Austronesian-speaking peoples of South Halmahera. Robert Blust (2013) considers this paradox to be a result of historical language replacement. The ethnic groups of the north Halmahera area share civilizational links with the Islamic world and the populations of western Indonesia, betraying a mismatch between cultural and linguistic affiliation.

At the turn of the 19th century, the NH languages had already been recognized as a highly divergent (but perhaps Austronesian) group. Their non-Austronesian character was finally demonstrated by Hendrik van der Veen in 1915. The structural similarities between NH and certain Papuan families in Melanesia were noted as far back as 1900, and an early version of the West Papuan family was proposed by H.K.J. Cowan (1957–1965), linking NH with the Bird's Head languages, among others (based on lexical and morphemic evidence). Holton and Klamer (2018: 626) do not unequivocally accept the genealogical unity of West Papuan, but note that the more restricted "West Papuan" proposal, linking NH with West Bird's Head in particular (and also the Yapen/Yawa languages), appears to be particularly convincing.

The family has a demonstrable Austronesian stratum, with the ancestral language having received lexical influence from an unnamed Philippine language (or languages). There are also borrowings of probable Central Maluku origin, as well as Oceanic ones; in particular, Voorhoeve (1982) has noted a set of lexical similarities between NH and the Central Papuan languages of the south coast of Papua New Guinea. In addition, Ternate, Tidore, West Makian, and Sahu have adopted many elements of Austronesian grammar; however, other languages of the family are rather conservative, having preserved the SOV word order, the use of postpositions, as well as the use of object and subject prefixes. The presence of archaic typological features sharply distinguishes these languages from other West Papuan languages, which generally have a left-headed syntactic structure.

== Internal classification ==
The family is dialectally heterogeneous, with blurry lines between different languages. While different authors tend to disagree on the number of distinct languages identified, there is general accord regarding the internal subgrouping of the family.

The classification used here is that of Voorhoeve 1988.

- - Core Halmaheran
    - Ternate–Tidore
    - Sahu: Sahu, Waioli, Gamkonora, Tiana
    - Galela–Tobelo (Northeast Halmaheran): Tobelo–Togutil, Galela–Loloda, Modole, Pagu–Kao, Tabaru
  - West Makian

West Makian is divergent due to heavy Austronesian influence. It was once classified as an Austronesian language. It should be distinguished from East Makian (Taba), an unrelated Austronesian language.

There is a degree of mutual intelligibility between the Galela–Tobelo languages, and Voorhoeve 1988 considered them dialects of a language he called Northeast Halmaheran, though most speakers consider them to be distinct languages. They are probably best considered separate languages, as mutual intelligibility testing appears to be skewed by the cultural practice of multilingualism.

Ternate and Tidore are generally treated as separate languages, though there is little Abstand involved, and the separation appears to be based on sociopolitical grounds. Voorhoeve groups these idioms together as varieties of a unitary "Ternate-Tidore" language, while Miriam van Staden classifies them as distinct languages. Other North Halmahera languages, such as Galela and Tobelo, have received significant influence from Ternate, a historical legacy of the dominance of the Ternate Sultanate in the Moluccas. Many Ternate loanwords can be found in Sahu.

== Lexical reconstruction ==
Proto-North Halmahera consonants are (after Voorhoeve 1994: 68, cited in Holton and Klamer 2018: 584):

		Labial	Dental		Velar	Guttural
		Labial	Plain	Retroflex	Velar	Guttural
Plosive	Unvoiced	p	t		k	q
Plosive	Voiced	b	d	ɖ <ḋ>	g	
Fricative		f	s			h
Nasal		m	n		ŋ	
Approximant		w	l (r)			

Proto-North Halmahera is notable for having the voiced retroflex stop *ɖ, as retroflex consonants are often not found in Papuan languages.

The following proto-North Halmahera reconstructions are listed in Holton and Klamer (2018: 620–621). Most of the forms in Holton and Klamer are derived from Wada (1980).

proto-North Halmahera reconstructions (Holton & Klamer 2018)

gloss	proto-North Halmahera
‘back’	*ḋuḋun
‘bad’	*torou
‘bark’	*kahi
‘big’	*lamok
‘bite’	*goli
‘black’	*tarom
‘blood’	*aun
‘blow’	*hoa
‘blue’	*bisi
‘boil’	*sakahi
‘bone’	*koboŋ
‘brother’	*hiraŋ
‘burn’	*so(ŋa)ra
‘child’	*ŋopak
‘cloud’	*lobi
‘cold’ (1)	*alo
‘cold’ (2)	*malat
‘come’	*bola
‘count’	*etoŋ
‘cry’	*ores
‘cut’	*luit
‘dance’	*selo
‘die’	*soneŋ
‘dig’	*puait
‘dirty’	*pepeke
‘dog’	*kaso
‘dull’	*boŋo
‘ear’	*ŋauk
‘earth’	*tonak
‘eat’	*oḋom
‘egg’	*boro
‘eight’	*tupaaŋe
‘eye’	*lako
‘fall’	*ḋota
‘far’	*kurut
‘fat, grease’	*saki
‘father’	*baba
‘fear’	*moḋoŋ
‘feather’	*gogo
‘female’	*ŋopeḋeka
‘few’	*ucu
‘fight’	*kuḋubu
‘fire’	*uku
‘fish’	*nawok
‘five’	*motoha
‘float’	*bawo
‘flow’	*uhis
‘flower’	*leru
‘fly’	*sosor
‘fog’	*rasa
‘four’	*ihat
‘fruit’	*sopok
‘give’	*hike
‘good’	*loha
‘grass’	*ŋaŋaru
‘green’	*ijo
‘guts’	*toto
‘hair’	*hutu
‘hand’	*giam
‘head’	*sahek
‘hear’	*isen
‘heart’	*siniŋa
‘heavy’	*tubuso
‘hit’	*ŋapo
‘horn’	*taḋu
‘hot’	*sahuk
‘husband’	*rokat
‘kill’	*tooma
‘knee’	*puku
‘know’	*nako
‘lake’	*talaga
‘laugh’	*ḋohe
‘leaf’	*soka
‘left’	*gubali
‘leg/foot’	*ḋohu
‘lie’	*ḋaḋu
‘live’	*oho
‘liver’	*gate
‘long’ (1)	*kurut
‘long’ (2)	*teka
‘louse/flea’	*gani
‘male’	*naur
‘many’	*ḋala
‘meat’	*lake
‘moon’	*ŋoosa
‘mother’	*awa
‘mountain’	*tala
‘mouth’	*uru
‘nail’	*gitipir
‘name’	*roŋa
‘narrow’	*peneto
‘near’	*ḋumu
‘neck’	*toko
‘new’	*momuane
‘night’	*putu
‘nine’	*siwo
‘nose’	*ŋunuŋ
‘old’	*ŋowo
‘one’	*moi
‘person’	*ɲawa
‘pierce’	*topok
‘pull’	*lia
‘push’	*hito(si)
‘rain’	*muura
‘red’	*sawala
‘right’	*girinak
‘river’	*selera
‘roast’	*tupu
‘root’	*ŋutuk
‘rope’	*gumin
‘rotten’	*baka
‘round’	*pululun
‘rub’	*ese
‘salt’	*gasi
‘sand’	*ḋowoŋi
‘say’	*temo
‘scratch’	*rago
‘sea’	*ŋolot
‘see’	*kelelo
‘seed’	*gisisi
‘seven’	*tumuḋiŋi
‘sew’	*urit
‘sharp’	*ḋoto
‘shoot’	*ḋupu
‘short’	*timisi
‘sing’	*ɲaɲi
‘sister’	*biraŋ
‘sit’	*tamie
‘six’	*butaŋa
‘skin’	*kahi
‘sky’	*ḋipaŋ
‘sleep’	*kiolok
‘small’	*ece
‘smell’	*hame
‘smoke’	*ḋopo
‘smooth’	*maahi
‘snake’	*ŋihia
‘speak’	*bicara
‘spear’	*kamanu
‘spit’	*hobir
‘split’	*raca
‘stand’	*oko
‘star’	*ŋoma
‘stone’	*teto
‘straight’	*bolowo
‘suck’	*suyu
‘swell’	*ḋobo
‘swim’	*toboŋ
‘tail’	*pego
‘take, hold’	*aho
‘ten’	*mogiowok
‘thick’	*kipirin
‘thin’	*hina
‘think’	*fikiri < Arabic
‘three’	*saaŋe
‘throw’	*sariwi
‘tie’	*piriku
‘to dry’	*ḋuḋuŋ
‘tongue’	*akir
‘tooth’	*iŋir
‘tree’	*gota
‘true’	*tero
‘twenty’	*monohalok
‘two’	*sinoto
‘vomit’	*ŋunaŋ
‘walk’	*tagi
‘warm’	*sakuk
‘wash’	*boka
‘water’	*aker
‘way’	*ŋekom
‘wet’	*pesa
‘white’	*ares
‘wide’	*ŋohat
‘wife’	*peḋakat
‘wind’	*paro
‘wing’	*golipupu
‘wipe’	*piki
‘woods’	*poŋan
‘worm’	*kalubati
‘young’	*kiau

== Vocabulary comparison ==
The following basic vocabulary words are from the Trans-New Guinea database. The words cited constitute translation equivalents, whether they are cognate (e.g. utu, hutu for “hair”) or not (e.g. dofolo, apota for “head”).

gloss	Sahu	Tidore	West Makian
head	sae'e	dofolo	apota; tabia
hair	utu	hutu	gigo; onga
ear	kocowo'o; ngau'u; 'oki; sidete	ngau	kameu
eye	la'o	lao	afe; sado
nose	cu'dumu; ngunungu; payáha	ngun	mudefete
tooth	ngi'di	ing	wi
tongue	yai'i	aki	belo
leg			tarotaro
louse	gane	gan	bene
dog	nunu'u	kaso	aso
bird	namo	namo	haywan
egg	gosi; tounu	gosi	esi
blood	ngaunu	au	uni
bone	'bero; 'obongo	goka	subebi
skin	eno'o	ahi	fi
breast	susu	isu	susu
man	nau'u	nau-nau	at
woman	weré'a	faya	papa; songa
sky	diwanga	sorga	tupam
moon	ngara	ora	odo
water	'banyo	ake	be
fire	ci'du; naoto; u'u	uku	ipi
stone	ma'di	mafu	may
road, path	ngo'omo; tapaka	linga	gopao
name	lomanga	ronga	aym
eat	'doroga; kou; oromo; tabu	oyo; talesa	am; fajow; fiam
one	maténgo; moi	rimoi	gominye; maminye; meminye; minye
two	'di'di; romo'dí'di	malofo	dimaede; edeng; je; maedeng; medeng
