= Pagu language =

North Halmahera language spoken in Indonesia

Pagu
- Pago, Pagoe
- Native to: Indonesia
- Region: Halmahera
- Native speakers: (3,700 cited 2000)
- Language family: West Papuan: North Halmahera; Northern North Halmahera; Mainland North Halmahera; Kao River; Paguic; Pagu
- Dialects: Isam; Nuclear Pagu; Toliwiku

Language codes
- ISO 639-3: pgu
- Glottolog: pagu1249

Pagu (alt names: Pago, Pagoe), named after one of its dialects, is a North Halmahera language of Indonesia. The Kao language is closely related to this language.

== Dialects ==
The language is divided into three dialects, the following are:

- Pagu
  - Isam
  - Nuclear Pagu
  - Toliwiku
