= Jailolo (town) =

Town and former sultanate on Halmahera in Indonesia's Maluku Islands

Coordinates: 1°05′N 127°30′E

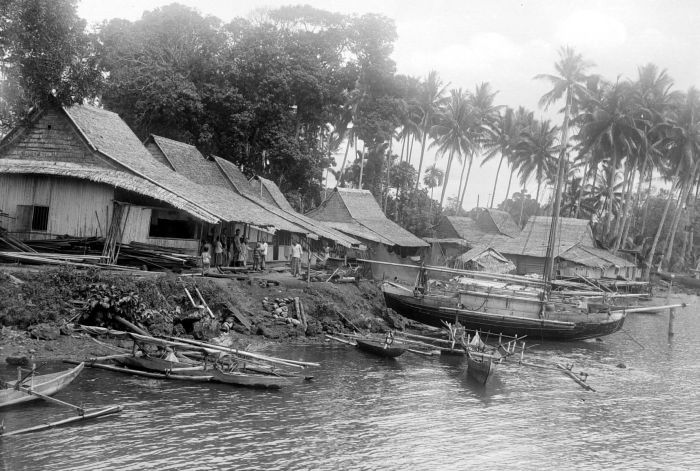
The beach at Jailolo around 1920

Jailolo is a town and former sultanate on Halmahera in Indonesia's Maluku Islands. It is located on the island's west coast approximately 20 km north of Ternate. Jailolo is a small port that serves Halmahera's northwestern coastal villages.

Before the arrival of Europeans, it was the most important political power in Halmahera. It is thought that the sultanate had a measure of influence.

A combined Portuguese and Ternatean force overran in it 1551. It was under the control of the Dutch and Ternateans for two centuries.

The Sultanate was re-established in 1798, by the Sultan of Tidore who had expelled the Dutch from his island and proclaimed a noble from Makian as Sultan of Jailolo. The Dutch forced the aristocracy into exile in 1832. Baba Hassan attempted a revolt in 1876, but his rebellion was easily put down by steam-powered Dutch warships. In 1914, a revolt over taxation saw Jailoloans kill the colonial district officer, and there was a revolt on the island of Waigeo off western New Guinea. The sultan's palace was located on a flat-topped hill above the junction of the Sahu-Sidangoli road, however, all remnants have now disappeared.

The local people are the Sahu. They perform traditional dances in August and September to celebrate the rice harvest. They recently converted to Christianity.

== See also ==
- Jailolo volcanic complex
- Sultanate of Jailolo
- list of rulers of Maluku
