= Kao language =

North Halmahera language spoken in Indonesia

Kao
- Native to: Indonesia
- Region: North Maluku
- Ethnicity: Kao
- Native speakers: 1,250 (2014)
- Language family: West Papuan?: North Halmahera; Northern North Halmahera; Mainland North Halmahera; Kao River; Paguic; Kao

Language codes
- ISO 639-3: kax Kao
- Glottolog: kaoo1238
- ELP: Kao; Kao
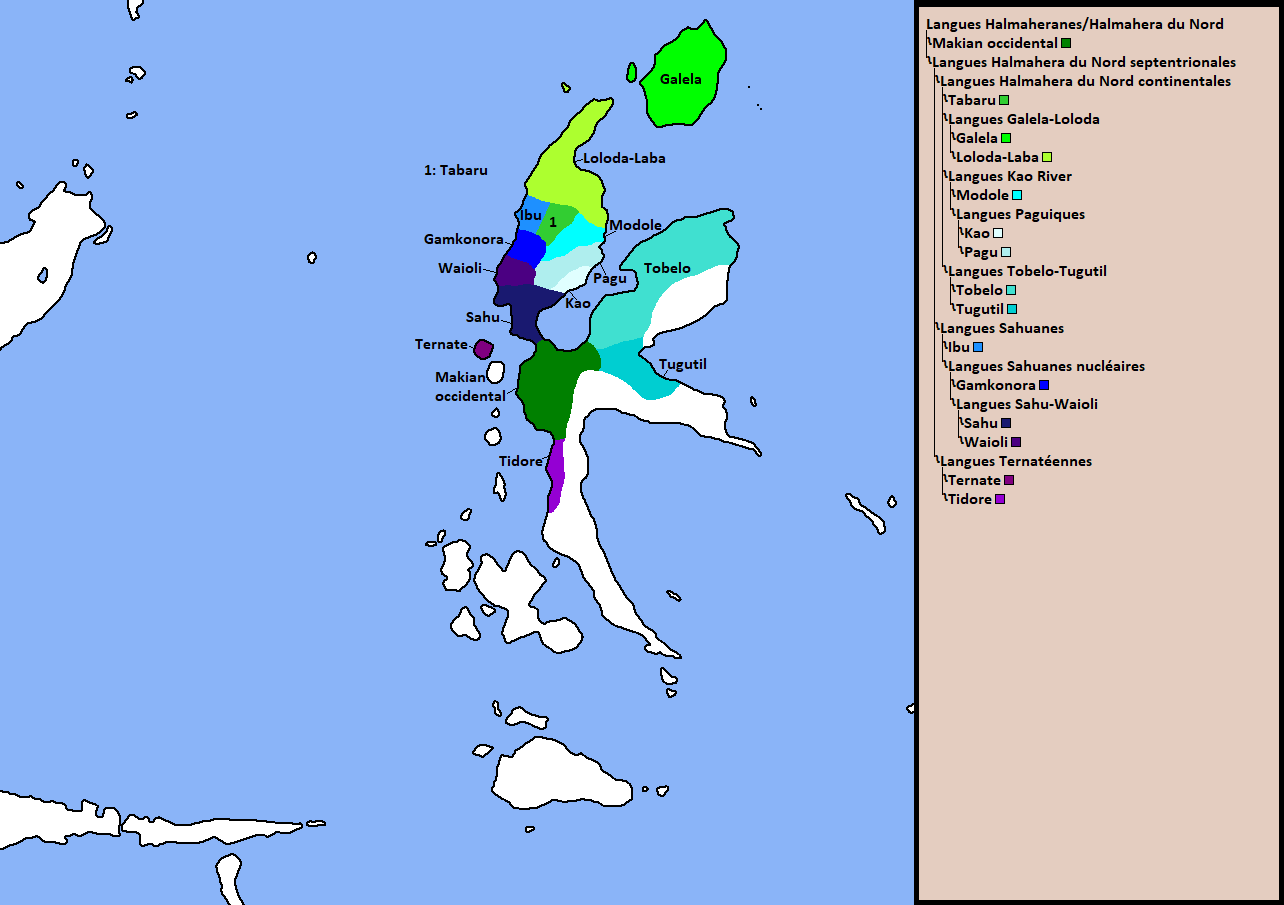
- Map of the North Halmahera languages (including Kao)

- Location within Indonesia

Kao is an endangered non-Austronesian language. This language is spoken in North Halmahera Regency, North Maluku. The last survey in 2008 conducted by the Research Team from the Faculty of Letters and Culture Khairun University states that Kao language is only used by family over 40 years of age. In traditional, social, and daily events, or religious ceremonies, the Kao language is no longer used.

== History and spread ==
The Kao language is spoken by the Kao people. The openness to cultural influences brought by immigrants to their region gave rise to acculturation and inculturation in accordance with values considered good by society. This also has an impact on the decreasing level of use of the Kao language.

Currently, the Kao language is being displaced by Ternate Malay, a local Malay-based creole. However, a preservation effort is still carried out by performing arts. For example, the Gala Kao which is carried out by playing Kao-language rhymes. Even though it is rarely used in general in everyday life, the Kao people still acknowledge that this language is their native language.

The current distribution of the Kao language is in the interior of North Halmahera, the mouth of the Kao River, and the Kao capital area (Kao district).

== Language speakers ==
Judging from the speakers, it is believed that the older the speakers of a language, the more fluent they are.

1. 60 years and older: very fluent and they understand complex old words.
2. 50–59 years: fluent, but they do not understand complex vocabulary.
3. 40–49 years: not fluent, but they understand and communicate in Kao quite fluently.
