= Tabaru language =

Language

Tabaru
- Native to: Indonesia
- Region: Halmahera
- Ethnicity: Tabaru people
- Native speakers: (15,000 cited 1991)
- Language family: West Papuan?: North Halmahera; Galela–Tobelo; Tabaru

Language codes
- ISO 639-3: tby
- Glottolog: taba1263
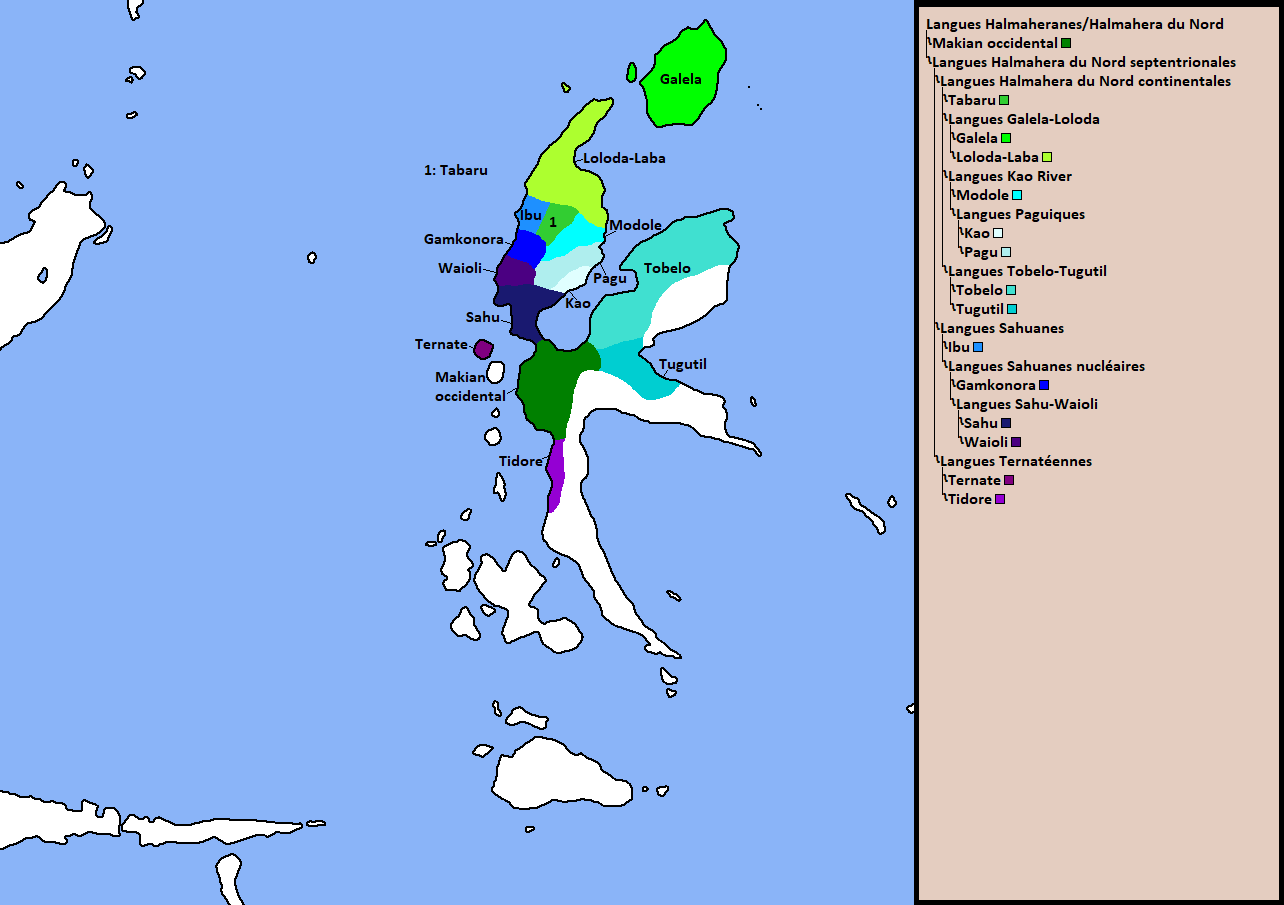
- Map of the North Halmahera languages (including Tabaru)

Tabaru is a North Halmahera language of Indonesia.

== Phonology ==
=== Vowels ===
Tabaru has a simple five vowel system: a, e, i, o, u.

=== Consonants ===
		Labial	Alveolar	Palatal	Velar	Glottal
Nasal		m	n	ɲ	ŋ	
Plosive	voiceless	p	t	c	k	
Plosive	voiced	b	d	ɟ	ɡ	
Fricative		f	s			h
Semivowel				j	w	
Lateral			l			
Trill			r			

=== Syllable structure and stress ===
On the surface level, Tabaru only allows syllables of the type (C)V. Words with an underlying final consonant add an echo vowel: ngówaka (/ngowak/) ′child′, ókere (/oker/) ′drink′, sárimi (/sarim/) ′paddle′, ódomo (/odom/) ′eat′, pálusu (/palus/) ′answer′. The echo vowel is dropped when a suffix is added: woísene (/woisen/) ′hear′, but woisenoka (/woisen/ + /oka/) ′heard′. Stress regularly falls on the penultimate syllable, but shifts to the antepenultimate when the word takes an echo vowel.
