= Ternate people =

People of North Maluku, Indonesia

The Ternate people are located on Ternate Island with a population of 50,000 people. The island is included in the province of North Maluku with the capital city of Ternate. In addition to being located on the island of origin, the people of Ternate are also located in other areas, such as Bacan Islands and Obi Islands which are part of the South Halmahera Regency, and other areas inside and outside North Maluku Province.

Most Ternate people are Muslims. There is also a small Protestant minority. Ternate people speak the Ternate language, which is a non-Austronesian language that belongs to the North Halmahera branch of the West Papuan languages.
