= Waioli language =

Language

Waioli
- Native to: Indonesia
- Region: Halmahera
- Native speakers: (3,000 cited 1987)
- Language family: West Papuan?: North Halmahera; Sahu; Waioli

Language codes
- ISO 639-3: wli
- Glottolog: waio1238

Waioli is a North Halmahera language of Indonesia.
