= Modole language =

North Halmahera language spoken in Indonesia

Modole
- Native to: Indonesia
- Region: Halmahera
- Native speakers: (2,000 cited 1983)
- Language family: West Papuan?: North Halmahera; Galela–Tobelo; Modole

Language codes
- ISO 639-3: mqo
- Glottolog: modo1249

Modole is a North Halmahera language of Indonesia. The language is spoken in several villages in the Kao region on the northern peninsula of the island of Halmahera.
