= Loloda language =

North Halmahera language spoken in Indonesia

Loloda
- Loda
- Native to: Indonesia
- Region: North Halmahera
- Native speakers: (17,000 ethnicity = Loloda people cited 1991)
- Language family: West Papuan?: North Halmahera; Galela–Tobelo; Loloda
- Dialects: Bakun

Language codes
- ISO 639-3: Either: loa – Loloda lau – Laba
- Glottolog: lolo1264
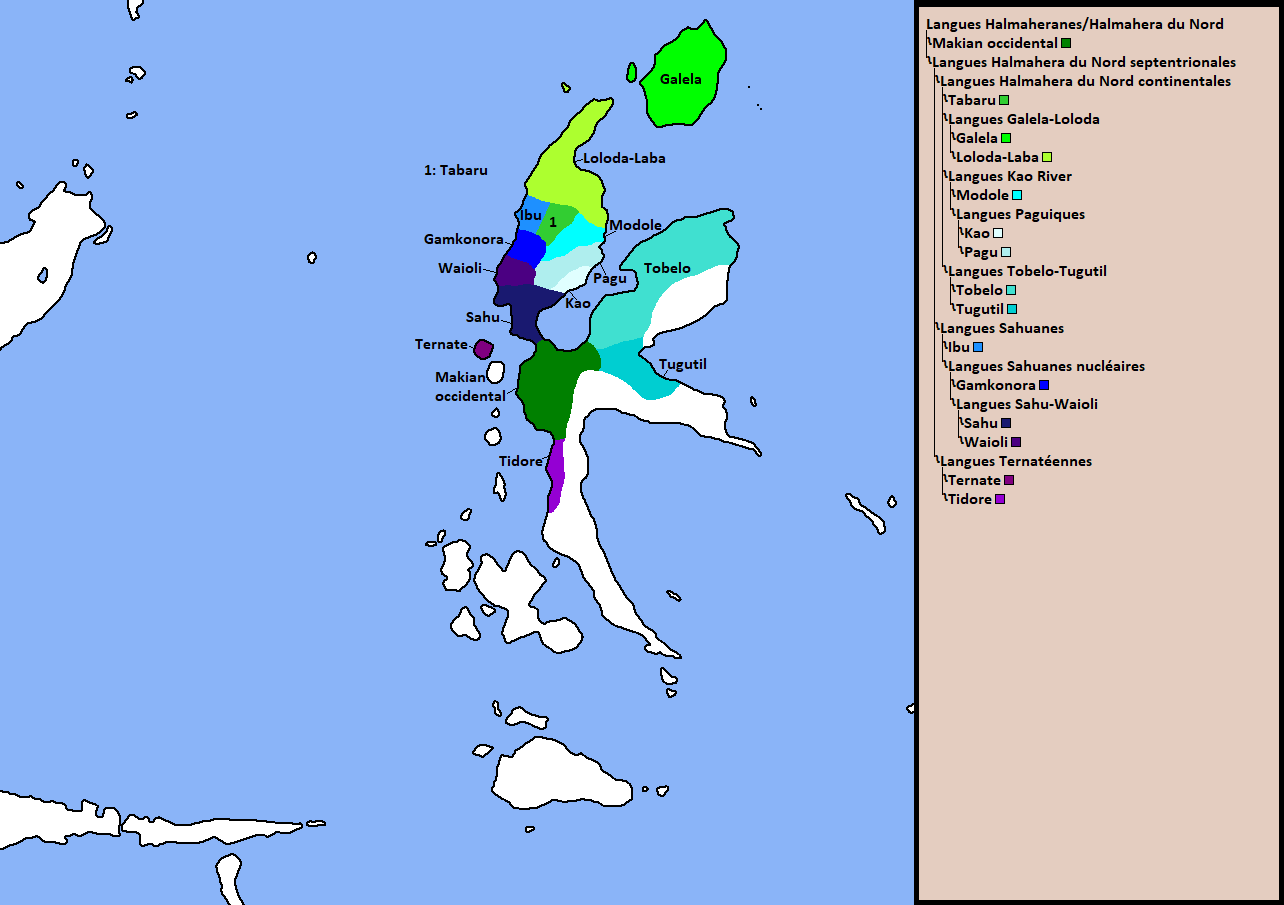
- Map of the North Halmahera languages (including Loloda)

Loloda is a North Halmahera language of Indonesia.

The Loloda area is part of the West Halmahera Regency of North Malukku. The coastline here is very rugged, with sometimes near vertical cliffs rising out of the sea. The mostly Christian population of the mainland mostly lives in isolated villages set on scenic bays.

Kedi, the regional capital of southern Loloda which belongs to West Halmahera Regency, is in the south, near the border with Ibu. North Loloda, belonging to North Halmahera Regency, also includes a cluster of largish islands off its northern coastline. The population of these very pretty islands, the largest of which are Doi and Dagasuli, is mostly Muslim.

The villages along the northernmost section of the coast are ethnically Galelarese, and in general the culture and language of Loloda is quite close to that of neighbouring Galela. There is a local Sultan who is not understood to be very powerful. Loloda has no roads yet (though they are on the planning boards) so all transport to and around the district is by boat.
