= Galela language =

Papuan language

Galela
- Native to: Indonesia
- Region: Morotai Island Regency (North Maluku)
- Ethnicity: Galela people
- Native speakers: (79,000 cited 1990)
- Language family: West Papuan?: North Halmahera; Galela–Tobelo; Galela
- Dialects: Kadai; Morotai; Kadina; Sopi

Language codes
- ISO 639-3: gbi
- Glottolog: gale1259
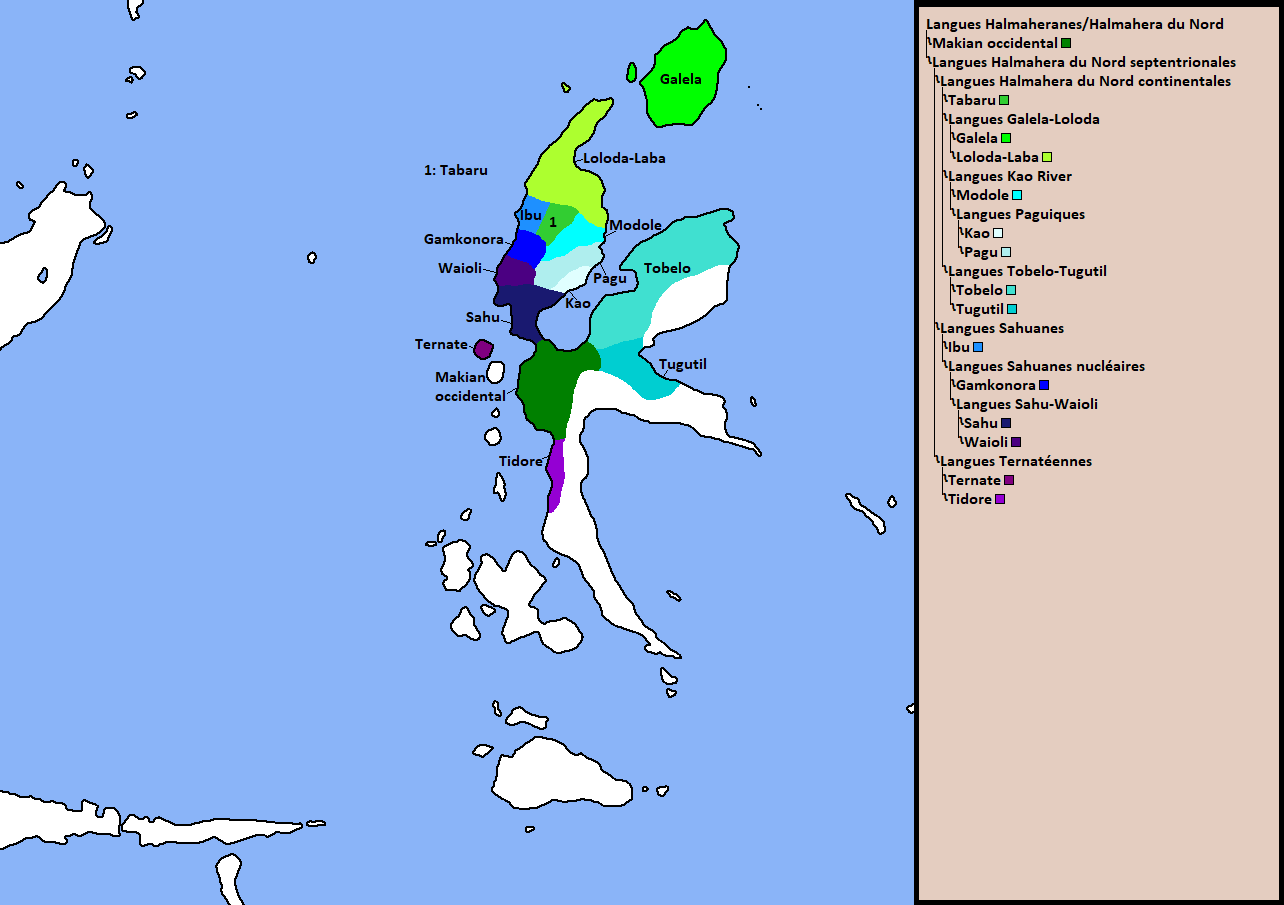
- Map of the North Halmahera languages (including Galela)

Galela is the second most populous Papuan language spoken west of New Guinea (in Morotai Island and surrounding islands province of North Maluku, Indonesia), with some 80,000 speakers. Its dialects are Kadai (41,000), Morotai (24,000), Kadina (10,000), and Sopi (4,000). Its closest relative is the and Loloda language.

Galela is spoken on the eastern side of the northern tip of Halmahera island (in the Galela districts and in neighbouring villages in the Tobelo and Loloda districts), on Morotai Island to the north, on the Bacan and Obi islands to the south of Halmahera, and in scattered settlements along the southwest coast. All are in North Maluku province of Indonesia.

== Phonology ==
The following sound inventory is based on Shelden (1998).

=== Vowels ===
Galela has a simple five vowel system: /a/, /i/, /u/, /e/, /o/.

=== Consonants ===
Galela orthography largely follows Indonesian spelling conventions. If orthography differs from IPA, the orthography is in ⟨brackets⟩.

		Labial	Alveolar		Palato-alveolar/ Palatal	Velar	Glottal
		Labial	Laminal	Apical	Palato-alveolar/ Palatal	Velar	Glottal
Nasal		m	n		ɲ ⟨ny⟩	ŋ ⟨ng⟩	
Plosive/ Affricate	voiceless	p	t		t͡ʃ ⟨c⟩	k	
Plosive/ Affricate	voiced	b	d̻ ⟨ḋ⟩	d̺ ⟨d⟩	d͡ʒ ⟨j⟩	g	
Fricative		ɸ ⟨f⟩	s				h
Flap			ɾ				
Lateral			l				
Semivowel		w			j ⟨y⟩		

== Grammar ==
=== Pronouns ===
Galela has two free pronoun sets, and two sets of bound pronominal prefixes. The use of the pronominal prefixes is governed by semantic alignment: actor prefixes are used to index the S-argument of active intransitive verbs and the A-argument of transitive verbs, while undergoer prefixes index the S-argument of stative intransitive verbs and the P-argument of transitive verbs.

			independent	possessive	actor	undergoer
1st person	singular		ngohi	ai	to-	i-
1st person	plural	exclusive	ngomi	mia	mi-	mi-
1st person	plural	inclusive	ngone	nanga	po-	na-
2nd person	singular		ngona	ani	no-	ni-
2nd person	plural		ngini	nia	ni-	ni-
3rd person	singular	masc	una	awi	wo-	wi-
3rd person	singular	fem	muna	ami	mo-	mi-
3rd person	plural	human	ona	manga	yo-	ya-
3rd person	non-human		i	ma	i-	ḋa-
