= Pekaulang =

- Town
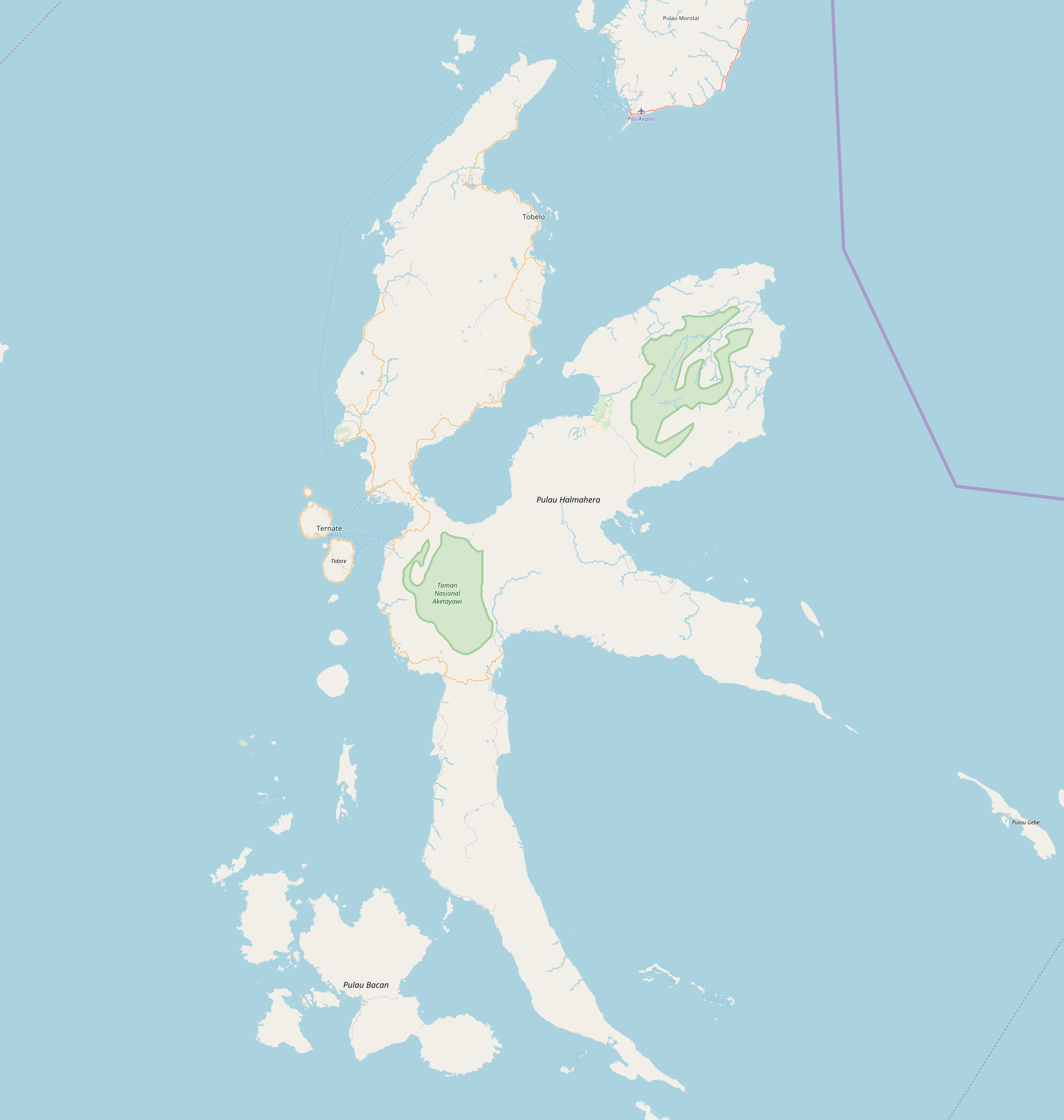
- Location in Halmahera, Maluku Islands and Indonesia Pekaulang (Maluku) Pekaulang (Indonesia)
- Coordinates: 0°42′N 128°18′E
- Country: Indonesia
- Region: Maluku Islands
- Province: North Maluku
- Regency: East Halmahera Regency

Population
  - Total: 12.816
- Time zone: UTC+9 (IEST)
- Area code: (+62) 921
- Villages: 10

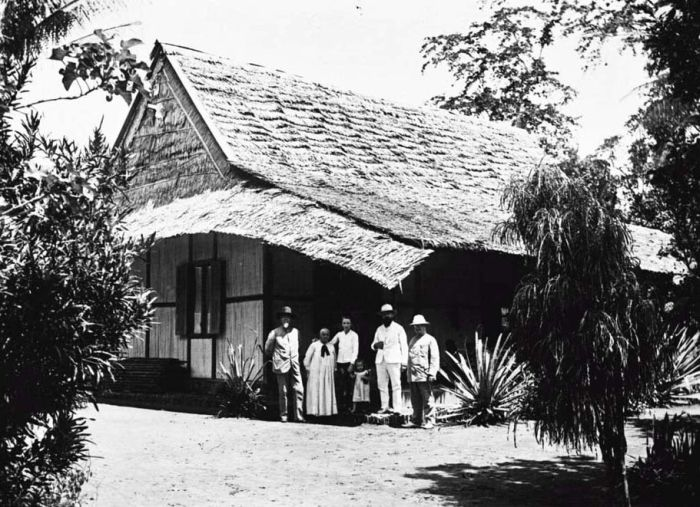
Missionaries in Buli near Maba around 1905-1914

Pekaulang is an administrative division of the Maba district in East Halmahera Regency, North Maluku, Indonesia.

Buli, formerly Boeli is a village in Pekaulang. Most of the people in Buli are Christian and about a third of the population is Muslim.

== See also ==
- Buli Airport
