= Aketajawe-Lolobata National Park =

National park in Indonesia

- Taman Nasional Aketajawe-Lolobata
- IUCN category II (national park)
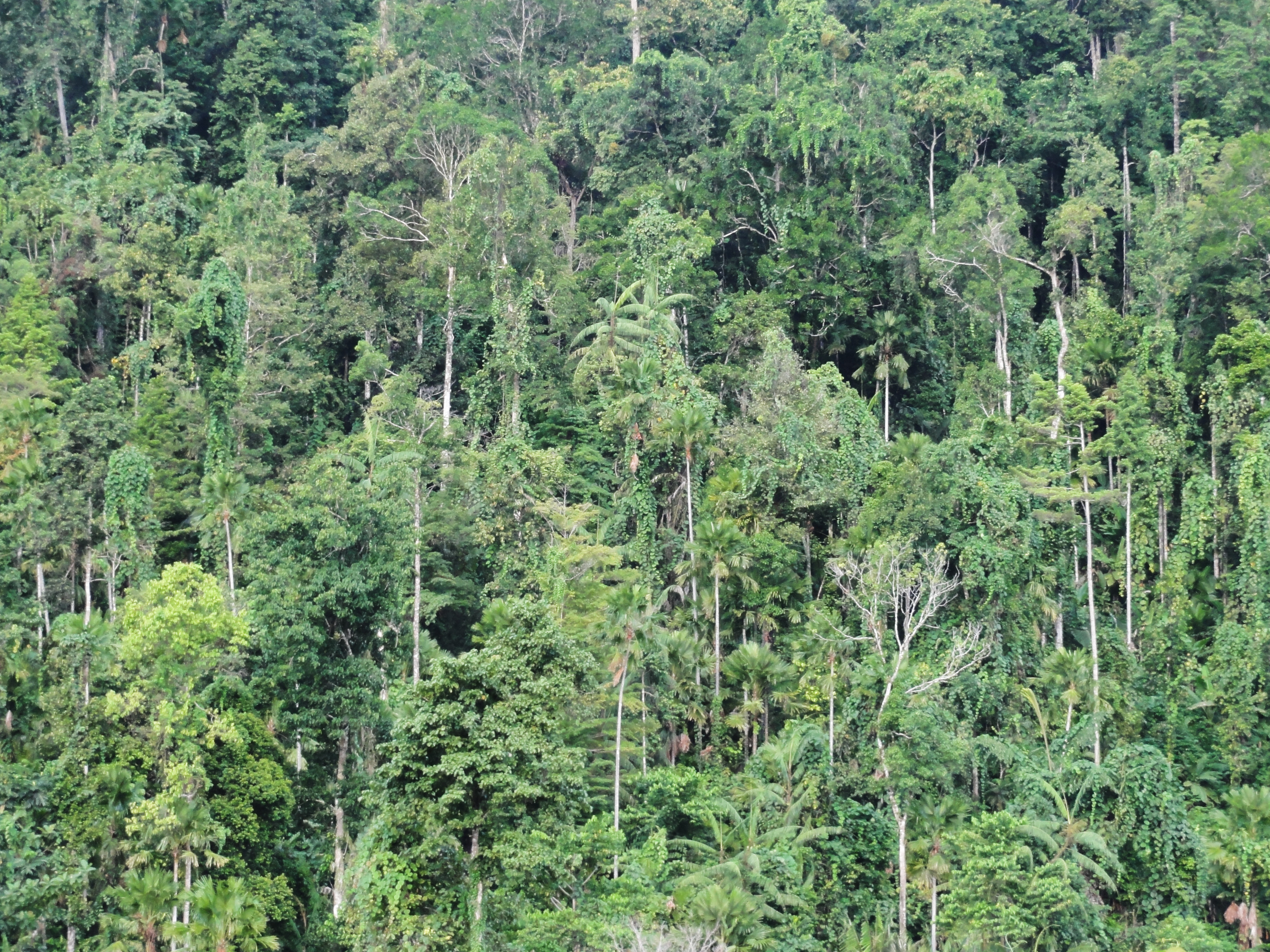
- Forest at the edge of Aketajawe-Lolobata

- Location within North Maluku
- Location: Halmahera, North Maluku, Indonesia
- Coordinates: 1°09′N 128°16′E
- Area: 1,673 km^{2} (646 sq mi)
- Established: 2004
- Governing body: Ministry of Environment and Forestry
- Website: www.aketajawelolobata.org

Aketajawe-Lolobata National Park is a national park on Halmahera, the biggest island in the North Maluku province of Indonesia. The park is considered by BirdLife International to be vital for the survival of at least 23 endemic bird species. Aketajawe-Lolobata, which has an area of 167,300 hectares, was declared a national park in 2004.

== Location and geography ==
The Aketajawe-Lolobata National Park is located in the northern part of Halmahera island in the East Halmahera Regency of North Maluku. It is part of the Wallacea biodiversity hotspot.

== Flora and fauna ==
The vegetation of the national park consists primarily of lowland and montane rainforest. The forest is characterised by a high level of biodiversity, including Agathis species, Calophyllum inophyllum, Octomeles sumatrana, Koordersiodendron pinnatum, Pometia pinnata, Intsia bijuga, Canarium mehenbethene gaerta, and Palaquium obtusifolium.

From 51 mammal species found in North Maluku, 28 are found on Halmahera Island, of which seven are endemic to this region, and one, the ornate cuscus (Phalanger ornatus), is endemic to the island.

Of the 243 bird species in North Maluku, 211 have been recorded on Halmahera Island of which 24 are endemic, including Wallace's standardwing, Halmahera cuckooshrike, sombre kingfisher, white cockatoo, invisible rail, blue-and-white kingfisher, dusky-brown oriole, Moluccan goshawk, dusky scrubfowl, long-billed crow, grey-headed fruit dove, ivory-breasted pitta, and azure dollarbird.

Reptiles and amphibians in the park include the Callulops dubia, Caphixalus montanus, and Hydrosaurus werneri.

Other endemic animals on Halmahera include two grasshopper species, three dragonfly species, one butterfly species, and twenty land mollusc species.

== Human habitation ==
The park is home to a semi-nomadic community of people known as the Togutil people or Tobelo Dalam (Forest Tobelo). They share a common language with the coastal village communities of the Tobelo people. Their number is estimated to be around 2,000. From 300 to 500, and this is also an estimate, live in real isolation in the forest where they obtain their means of subsistence.

== Conservation and threats ==
In 1981 the National Conservation Plan proposed the designation of four protected areas: Aketajawe, Lolobata, Saketa and Gunung Gamkonora. The 1993 Indonesian Biodiversity Action Plan recommended the designation of an integrated protected area. Survey work by BirdLife in 1994–1996 identified Aketajawe-Lolobata as an Important Bird Area.

In 1995 the Aketajawe and Lolobata areas, were proposed as a National Park. In 1999 a large forest area of 7,264,707 hectares was classified as State Forest Area, which included the Aketajawe and Lolobata Forest Groups. In 2004 a National Park has been declared with a total area of 167,300 ha, which is formed by the Aketajawe Protected Forest Group (77,100 ha) in the districts of Central Halmahera and Kota Tidore Kepulauan, and Lolobata Forest Group (90,200 ha) in East Halmahera district.

Threats to the national park are posed by illegal logging and mining. Between 1990 and 2003 forests declined in North Maluku from 86% to just under 70%, with much of it occurring in the lowlands (below 400m). As a result, species with large amounts of their range at low elevations were most strongly affected.
