= Tobelo people =

O'Hoberera Manyawa
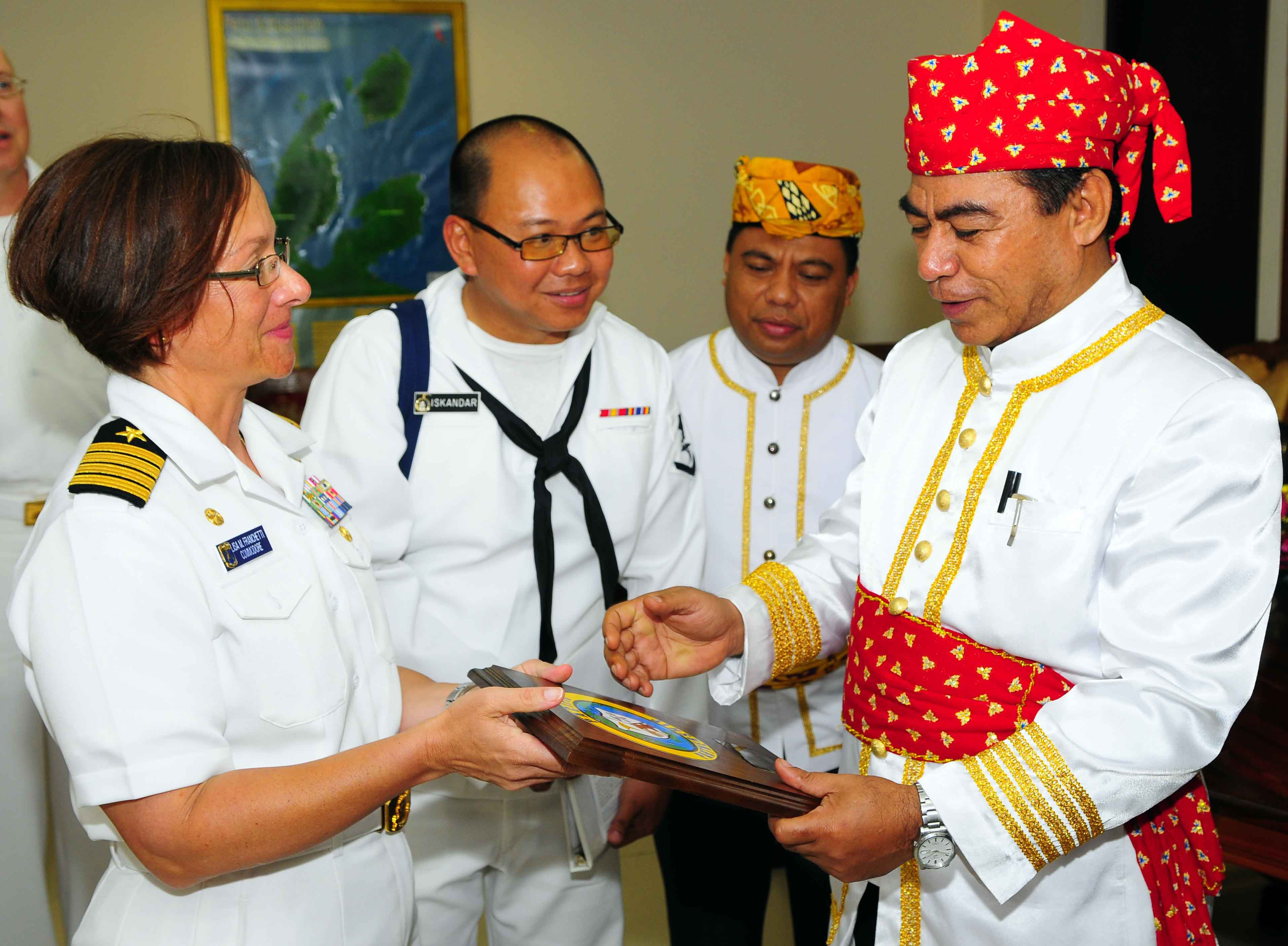
- Captain Lisa M. Franchetti (left), commander of Pacific Partnership 2010, presents a plaque to Regent of North Halmahera, Hein Namotemo (right), who is seen in traditional Tobelo attire.

Regions with significant populations
- Indonesia (North Halmahera Regency, North Maluku)

Languages
- North Halmahera languages (Tobelo language), Indonesian language

Religion
- Christianity (51%) (predominantly), Folk religion (30%), Islam (19%)

Related ethnic groups
- Togutil, Kao, Maba

The Tobelo people (Tobelo: O'Hoberera Manyawa) are one of the northern Halmahera peoples living in eastern Indonesia, in the northern part of the Maluku Islands and in the eastern side of North Halmahera Regency.

== Description ==
Tobelo people are divided into several sub-ethnic groups namely, Dodinga people, Boeng people, Kao people, and other groups. The total population of the people is about 85,000.

The Ternate people had a significant influence on the Tobelo people, who entered the Sultanate of Ternate in the 15th through 19th centuries. Tobelo people also dominated such small peoples of the interior of northern Halmahera as the Pagu and Tabaru people.

The Tobelo people are highly mobile, but their settlements are mainly located along the coastline. Ground skeleton-stilted houses (tathu) are built from bamboo, and the roofing is made of leaves of sago palms or roof shingle.

The tribes of Togutil, calling themselves the O'Hongana Manyawa (people that live inside the forest), also called Inner Tobelo, live in the forests in the depths of the island of Halmahera, settling near the river valleys, stand out. The number of Togutils is estimated between 1500 and 3000 people according to various studies since 2001. According to these studies too, between 300 and 500 of them live in isolation in the forest living in a small groups identified by authorities, in the Aketajawe-Lolobata National Park. This is in contrast to the coastal Tobelo people that call themselves, O’Hoberera Manyawa, which means people that live outside of forests.

In the early 1980s, they still led a nomadic way of life, mainly by hunting, stealing and growing sago. From time to time they used small fields, where they grew bananas, cassava, fruits and coconuts by the slash-and-burn method of agriculture. Ethnologists refute their reputation of being violent or even unsociable. In some parts of the island, they have to deal with logging and mining. According to videos, some seem to adapt with it a exchanging products. Many Togutil already mixed with the populations from the coastal villages and live near them. The regional authorities have opened an office in order to facilitate their integration. Some settled in houses built by the authorities as part of social integration programs, such as in Dodaga (Maba).

They obtain monetary income from the sale of forest products or hiring themselves out to new settlers to clear jungle areas for farming. Some donations are brought to them by the police.

== Language ==
Among the Tobelo people, they speak Indonesian, Ternate, and also Tobelo, which has several dialects such as Gamsungi, Dodinga, and Boeng.

== Religion ==
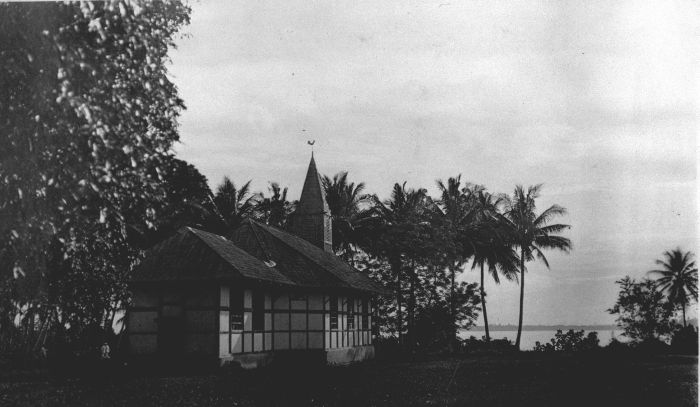
A Protestant church in Tobelo, 1924.

The majority of the Tobelo are Reformed Christians, while others are Sunni Muslims. Traditional beliefs, including the vestiges of shamanism and the cult of spirits, exert a strong influence in everyday life.

The process of adopting Christianity among the forest Tobelo people living in the northeast of Halmahera was very lengthy and complex. Only after decades of resistance did they begin to profess the Bible in the late 1980s. However, the version of Christianity that they chose was not the one that was preached to them by the Tobelo language-speaking societies with which they maintain family and marriage ties, but the one that was brought to this region by American missionaries.

In 1999–2001, the region was engulfed by religious-ethnic violence. The end of the conflict between Muslims and Christians was brought about in April 2001, when a peaceful ceremony was held in the hope that the religious conflict that had convulsed the island of Halmahera would not happen again. The ceremony consisted of the adat ritual (from Indonesian, "customary law") and vowing that both sides of the conflict, Muslims and Christians, will respect each other's rights and will forever renounce violence.

This ceremony was more than just a cultural manifestation. It symbolized the majority decision in the province of North Maluku to recognize adat as a guarantor of social unity and harmony in the region.

Prior to this, the local government informed senior government officials and other political leaders that if they could not change the situation for a better life and facilitate the return to the region of forced relocating, then the capital of the new district of North Halmahera Regency would be another city rather than Tobelo. It was necessary to do something, and several leaders of influential associations decided that adat was the best solution. They believed that the resurrection of adat would change the point of identification of people from their religion to their Tobelo ethnic identity.

== Culture ==
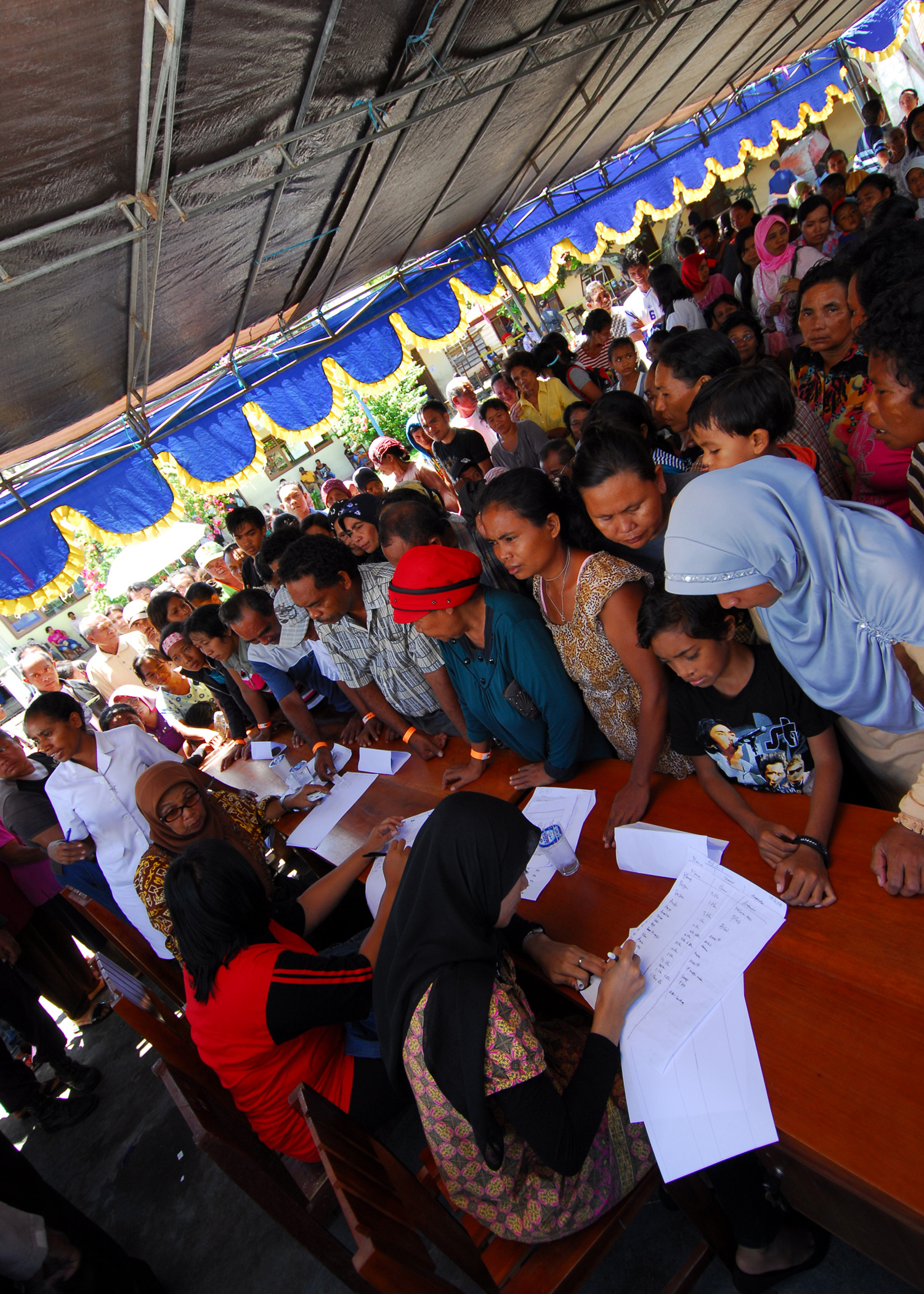
Tobelo patients queue at an engineering civic action program by the U.S. Pacific Fleet humanitarian and civic assistance in Indonesia.

Song and dance are the most common forms of folk art. Marriage is patrilocal. For Tobelo people, as well as for many other peoples governed by traditional social norms, the bilaterality of kinship is inherent.

Economic strength plays an important role in determining the size of the marriage dowry, based on a comparative estimate of the annual incomes of the households of the marriages, and also determines the amount of financial claims made to the groom's side. In Dirk Nilanda's documentary "Tobelo Marriage", it is shown in detail how much the women's work is invested in the preparation of a wedding feast; such as weaving, preparing a "rice slide" festive dish, a special refined table in the form of a canoe, all of which indicates the importance of the ceremony for both parties.

Women demonstrate "women's wealth", in a way which is very similar to the Trobriand Islands barter. Their dancing with a bushcraft knife in their hand indicates that women play an important role in the proceedings. After this comes the time of the celebration itself, which includes feasting, dancing and performing traditional songs. All this looks very exciting and speaks about the beauty and importance of the marital union being concluded. In the case of incest, a special ceremony of rupturing the hereditary line takes place, during which it is believed by sending the Tobelo couple floating or drowning into the river is done in order to prevent floods.

=== Clothing ===
Earlier, they wore Tapa cloth garments, but these were replaced by common clothes and of European style.

=== Dietary ===
The main food products are raw, dried and salted fish, as well as vegetable-based foods (baked and cooked products from rice, bananas, sago, sweet potato and cassava). Dishes from rice are not common, but are prepared on holidays.

=== Traditional activities ===
The most common occupations are fishing, fishery and manual farming (bananas, copra, palm wine, root crops, tubers, beans, dry rice). Also, the production of sago among the Kao and Boeng speakers.

== In popular culture ==
In 1982, in the Netherlands, in the town of Leiden, a film "Tobelo Marriage" was shot by the director Dirk Niland. The film allows one to look at the remote islander society, little known even to most Indonesians. The strengths of this work are its clarity, the research base and the provision of important information about this little-known people.

A program on Indonesian national TV presented the habits and customs of the Togutil people, and a Tik Tok account uses to publish videos to better know them.
