= Buli Airport =

Airport in Maba, Indonesia

Buli Airport Bandar Udara Buli
- IATA: PGQ; ICAO: WAEM

Summary
- Operator: UPT Ditjen Hubud
- Serves: Maba
- Location: Buli, Pekaulang, Maba, East Halmahera Regency, North Maluku, Indonesia
- Time zone: WIT (UTC+09:00)
- Elevation AMSL: 2 m (6.6 ft)
- Coordinates: 00°55′03″N 128°22′59″E

Map
- Halmahera, Maluku Islands

Runways
Direction	Length		Surface
Direction	m	ft	Surface
07/25	1,500	4,921	Asphalt

Buli Airport (Indonesian: Bandar Udara Buli) (IATA: PGQ, ICAO: WAEM) is a domestic airport serving the Maba area in East Halmahera Regency, North Maluku, Indonesia. The airport is located in Pekaulang village, Maba District, and is operated by the Technical Implementation Unit of the Directorate General of Civil Aviation.

== History ==
According to a 2020 study, passenger traffic at Buli Airport increased as mining activities expanded in East Halmahera, thus had created a need for future airport expansion.

Wings Air resumed scheduled flights between Ternate and Buli on 8 June 2021, operating twice weekly using ATR 72 aircraft. In March 2023, Wings Air announced the reopening of the Ternate-Buli route with two weekly flights. In January 2025, the Ministry of Transportation appointed Susi Air to operate subsidized pioneer flights between Buli and Ternate. Services were scheduled to begin in February 2025 with two weekly flights using a nine-seat aircraft. In February 2025, Wings Air announced that the Ternate–Buli route would resume operations on 21 March 2025 with two flights per week. The airline stated that the service was intended to improve accessibility and support tourism and economic development in East Halmahera.

== Airlines and destinations ==
The following airline serves Buli airport.

Airlines	Destinations
Susi Air	Ternate
Wings Air	Ternate
