= Togutil people =

Togutil
O'Hongana Manyawa
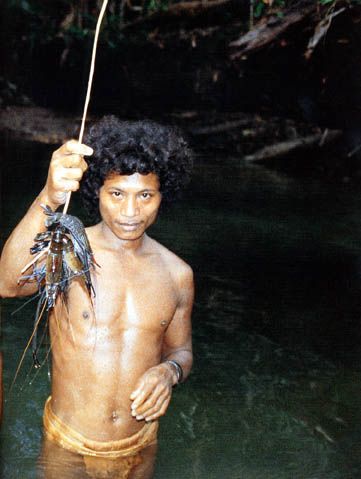
- A Togutil man at Halmahera island.

Total population
- ~3,000

Regions with significant populations
- Indonesia (Halmahera)

Languages
- Togutil, other North Halmahera languages (mainly Tobelo), Indonesian

Religion
- Animism (50-55%), Christianity (35-40%), Islam (5-10%)

Related ethnic groups
- Tobelo people

Togutil, also known as O'Hongana Manyawa, also known as Inner Tobelo, is an indigenous group with a semi-nomadic lifestyle living in the jungles of Totodoku, Tukur-Tukur, Lolobata, Kobekulo, and Buli in the Aketajawe-Lolobata National Park, North Halmahera Regency, North Maluku, Indonesia.

Their communities are often categorized as a uncontacted people living in the inner jungle area, compared to the Tobelo people living in the coastal area.

== Appearances ==
Their physical appearances, especially their facial features and skin tone have a stronger resemblance to the Malay people than of the Tobelo people.

== Name ==
The external ethnonym Togutil is equivalent to the native designations o fongana ma nyawa and o hongana ma nyawa (literally "the forest people").

The Indonesian name Togutil was popularised by Dutch ethnographer J. Platenkamp, who studied the ethnic groups in the island. The word is from the Tobelo word O’Tau Gutili, which means "medicine house". They prefer to call themselves the O'Hongana Manyawa (people that live inside of the forest); this is in contrast to the coastal Tobelo, which call themselves the O’Hoberera Manyawa (people that live outside of the forest).

== Location ==
Their settlements are usually in groups of community along river banks. There are about 42 households of Togutil communities that settled along the Dodaga River, while about 500 lived along the Akelamo river. Their houses are made of wood and bamboo with Pelem leaves (a type of Livistona) as roofing. Generally their houses do not have walls or wooden flooring.

The Togutils are categorized as a separate group of people living in the interiors of north and central Halmahera. From 300 to 500 live in isolation in the Aketajawe-Lolobata National Park. The others live near coastal villages where they come to exchange their products. Some settled in houses built by the Indonesian authorities as part of social integration programs, such as in the village of Dodaga, Maba.

The island's ecosystem is under continuous threat from industrial logging and nickel mining, and the decrease of forest and biodiversity has resulted in the loss of cultural knowledge and traditional practices of forest conservation among the Togutils, whose philosophy is "no forest, no life".

== Language ==
The Togutil people use the Togutil language (ISO 639-3:Tuj), which some classify as dialect of the Tobelo language used by the Tobelo population that live in the coastal area.

== History ==
According to local legend, the Togutil descend from coastal dwellers who moved to the jungles in order to avoid taxes. In 1915 during rule of the Dutch East Indies, there was an effort to settle them in the countryside of Kusuri and Tobelamo. But because they refused to pay taxes, they returned to the jungles and the settlement effort became a failure. However, there is no evidence to support this account of the Togutil's origins.

Ethnos360 (formally New Tribes Mission), an organisation of evangelical Christian missionaries, built a church and established a village at Tanjung Lili in eastern North Maluku in 1982. Proselytisation has been largely successful, with the mission's converted Togutil leaders continuing the work of the missionary organisation by spreading the gospel in more remote interior jungle areas. "Today almost all of the people who formerly lived along the Waisango, Lili, and Afu Rivers have converted to Christianity. Virtually all beliefs and practices connected with their previous indigenous cosmology, such as ancestor worship, have been discarded as incompatible with Christianity. Members of the community strongly discourage any attempt to reinitiate these practices, which are now considered to be misguided beliefs that they followed while under the influence of Satan."

== Population ==
The number of Togutils is estimated between 1,500 and 3,000 people, according to various studies carried out by Indonesian and foreign ethnologists since 2001. An estimate of 300-500 persons live in isolation in the forest.

== Practices and lifestyle ==
Their lifestyle is very much dependent on the surroundings of the jungle. Sago is a staple food. Some Togutil continue to wear traditional loincloths, although most of them have adopted modern clothing. They are traditionally nomadic hunter-gatherers, hunting wild boar, deer and other animals, as well as fishing and relying on sago palms as their main source of carbohydrates. They also harvest megapode eggs, resins, and antlers to sell to people from the coastal area. There is some horticulture, with bananas, cassava, sweet potatoes, papayas and sugar cane being common crops that can be found in their gardens. However, these gardens are not cultivated intensively owing to the Togutils' semi-nomadic lifestyle. They are sometimes accused of being violent or even unsociable, which ethnologists from Ternate refute.

== Isolation ==
Those living in isolation are often small groups identified by authorities, living in the Aketajawe-Lolobata National Park. Small videos show some of them speaking out vehemently against people approaching their territory. At the same time, many Togutil already mixed with the populations living in the coastal villages. The regional authorities of East Hamahera have opened a single office dedicated to them in order to facilitate their integration. Regularly donations are brought to them by the police.

In October 2023, footage was released of members of the group warning logging companies to stay away from their lands. The forests in which the uncontacted Togutil live are under threat from nickel mining for the production of electric car batteries.

== In popular culture ==
The Togutil have been the subject of programs on Indonesian national TV, presenting their habits and customs.
