= List of districts of North Maluku =

The province of North Maluku in Indonesia is divided into cities (kota) and regencies (kabupaten), both of which in turn are divided administratively into districts, known as kecamatan.

The 115 administrative districts (kecamatan) of North Maluku, with the city or regency each falls into, are as follows:

- Bacan, Halmahera Selatan
- Bacan Barat, Halmahera Selatan
- Bacan Barat Utara, Halmahera Selatan
- Bacan Selatan, Halmahera Selatan
- Bacan Timur, Halmahera Selatan
- Bacan Timur Selatan, Halmahera Selatan
- Bacan Timur Tengah, Halmahera Selatan
- Galela, Halmahera Utara
- Galela Barat, Halmahera Utara
- Galela Selatan, Halmahera Utara
- Galela Utara, Halmahera Utara
- Gane Barat, Halmahera Selatan
- Gane Barat Selatan, Halmahera Selatan
- Gane Barat Utara, Halmahera Selatan
- Gane Timur, Halmahera Selatan
- Gane Timur Selatan, Halmahera Selatan
- Gane Timur Tengah, Halmahera Selatan
- Ibu, Halmahera Barat
- Ibu Selatan, Halmahera Barat
- Ibu Utara, Halmahera Barat
- Jailolo Selatan, Halmahera Barat
- Jailolo Timur, Halmahera Barat
- Jailolo, Halmahera Barat
- Kao, Halmahera Utara
- Kao Barat, Halmahera Utara
- Kao Teluk, Halmahera Utara
- Kao Utara, Halmahera Utara
- Kasiruta Barat, Halmahera Selatan
- Kasiruta Timur, Halmahera Selatan
- Kayoa, Halmahera Selatan
- Kayoa Barat, Halmahera Selatan
- Kayoa Selatan, Halmahera Selatan
- Kayoa Utara, Halmahera Selatan
- Kepulauan Botanglomang, Halmahera Selatan
- Kepulauan Joronga, Halmahera Selatan
- Kota Maba, Halmahera Timur
- Kota Ternate Selatan, Ternate
- Kota Ternate Tengah, Ternate
- Kota Ternate Utara, Ternate
- Lede, Pulau Taliabu
- Loloda Kepolauan, Halmahera Barat
- Loloda Utara, Halmahera Utara
- Maba, Halmahera Timur
- Maba Selatan, Halmahera Timur
- Maba Tengah, Halmahera Timur
- Maba Utara, Halmahera Timur
- Makian Barat, Halmahera Selatan
- Malifut, Halmahera Utara
- Mandioli Selatan, Halmahera Selatan
- Mandioli Utara, Halmahera Selatan
- Mangoli Barat, Kepulauan Sula
- Mangoli Selatan, Kepulauan Sula
- Mangoli Tengah, Kepulauan Sula
- Mangoli Timur, Kepulauan Sula
- Mangoli Utara, Kepulauan Sula
- Mangoli Utara Timur, Kepulauan Sula
- Morotai Jaya, Pulau Morotai
- Morotai Selatan Barat, Pulau Morotai
- Morotai Selatan, Pulau Morotai
- Morotai Timur, Pulau Morotai
- Morotai Utara, Pulau Morotai
- Moti, Ternate
- Nggele, Kepulauan Sula
- Oba, Tidore Kepulauan
- Oba Selatan, Tidore Kepulauan
- Oba Tengah, Tidore Kepulauan
- Oba Utara, Tidore Kepulauan
- Obi, Halmahera Selatan
- Obi Barat, Halmahera Selatan
- Obi Selatan, Halmahera Selatan
- Obi Timur, Halmahera Selatan
- Obi Utara, Halmahera Selatan
- Patani, Halmahera Tengah
- Patani Barat, Halmahera Tengah
- Patani Timur, Halmahera Tengah
- Patani Utara, Halmahera Tengah
- Pulau Batang Dua, Ternate
- Pulau Gebe, Halmahera Tengah
- Pulau Hiri, Ternate
- Pulau Makian, Halmahera Selatan
- Pulau Ternate, Ternate
- Sahu, Halmahera Barat
- Sahu Timur, Halmahera Barat
- Sanana, Kepulauan Sula
- Sanana Utara, Kepulauan Sula
- Sulabesi Barat, Kepulauan Sula
- Sulabesi Selatan, Kepulauan Sula
- Sulabesi Tengah, Kepulauan Sula
- Sulabesi Timur, Kepulauan Sula
- Tabona, Pulau Taliabu
- Taliabu Barat, Pulau Taliabu
- Taliabu Barat Laut, Pulau Taliabu
- Taliabu Selatan, Pulau Taliabu
- Taliabu Timur, Pulau Taliabu
- Taliabu Timur Selatan, Pulau Taliabu
- Taliabu Utara, Pulau Taliabu
- Tidore, Tidore Kepulauan
- Tidore Selatan, Tidore Kepulauan
- Tidore Timur, Tidore Kepulauan
- Tidore Utara, Tidore Kepulauan
- Tobelo, Halmahera Utara
- Tobelo Selatan, Halmahera Utara
- Tobelo Tengah, Halmahera Utara
- Tobelo Timur, Halmahera Utara
- Tobelo Utara, Halmahera Utara
- Wasile, Halmahera Timur
- Wasile Selatan, Halmahera Timur
- Wasile Tengah, Halmahera Timur
- Wasile Timur, Halmahera Timur
- Wasile Utara, Halmahera Timur
- Weda, Halmahera Tengah
- Weda Selatan, Halmahera Tengah
- Weda Tengah, Halmahera Tengah
- Weda Timur, Halmahera Tengah
- Weda Utara, Halmahera Tengah

== Villages ==
Administrative villages (desa) listed for each district:

Regency	District	Languages in district	Administrative villages
Halmahera Barat	Ibu		Ake Boso, Akesibu, Gam Ici, Gamlamo (Gam Lamo), Kampung Baru, Kie Lei (Kie Ici), Maritango, Naga, Soana Masungi, Tahafo, Tobaol, Togola Sanger/Sangir, Togola Wayolo/Wayoli, Tongute Goin, Tongute Ternate, Tongute Ternate Selatan, Tungute Sungi (Tongute Sungi)
Halmahera Barat	Ibu Selatan		Adu, Baru, Bataka, Gamkonora, Gamsida, Gamsungi, Jere, Nanas, Ngalo Ngalo, Ngawet, Sarau, Talaga, Tobelos, Tobobol (Tabobol), Tosoa, Tuguaer
Halmahera Barat	Ibu Utara		Aru Jaya, Barona (Borona), Duono, Goin, Pasalulu, Podol, Sangaji Nyeku, Soasangaji, Tengowango (Teongowango), Todoke, Togoreba Sungi (Tugureba Sungi), Togoreba Tua, Togowo, Tolisaor, Tuguis, Tukuoku
Halmahera Barat	Jailolo		Acango, Akediri, Bobanehena, Bobo, Bobo Jiko, Buku Bualawa, Buku Maadu, Buku Matiti (Bukumatiti), Galala, Gam Lamo (Gamlamo), Gamtala, Guaemaadu (Guaimaadu), Guaria (Guaeria), Gufasa, Hate Bicara, Hoku Hoku Kie (Huku-Huku Kie), Idam Dehe (Idamdehe), Idamdehe Gamsungi, Jalan Baru, Kuripasai, Lolory (Loloy / Lolori), Marmabati (Marimbati), Matui, Pateng, Payo, Pornity (Porniti), Saria, Soakonora, Tauro, Tedeng, Toboso (Taboso / Tobosa / Tabaso), Todowangi (Todowongi), Tuada, Ulo
Halmahera Barat	Jailolo Selatan		Akeara, Akejailolo (Ake Jailolo), Akelaha, Bangkit Rahmat, Biamaahi, Bobane Dano, Braha, Dodinga, Domato, Gamlenge, Hijrah, Moiso, Ratem, Rioribati, Sidangoli Gam, Sidongoli Dehe (Sidangoli Dehe), Suka Damai, Taba Damai (DB), Tataleka, Tewe, Toniku, Tuguraci
Halmahera Barat	Loloda		Aruku, Baja, Bakun, Bakun Pante (Bakun Pantai), Bantoli (Bantol), Barataku, Bilote, Bosala, Buo, Gam Kahe (Gamkahe), Jange Lili (Jangailulu), Jano, Kahatola, Kedi, Laba Besar, Laba Kecil, Linggua, Puma Dadar (Pumadada), Salu, Soasio (Soa-Sio), Tasye, Tolofuo, Tomodo, Tosomolo, Totala, Totala Jaya, Tuguis
Halmahera Barat	Sahu		Balisoan Utara, Balisoang (Balisoan), Dere, Golo, Goro Goro, Jara Kore (Jaraoke), Lako Akederi (Lako Akediri), Lako Akelamo, Peot, Ropu Tengah Balu (Ropu Tengah Hulu), Sasur, Sasur Pantai, Susupu, Tacici, Tacim, Taraudu, Taruba, Todahe, Worat Worat
Halmahera Barat	Sahu Timur		Air Panas, Akelamo, Aketola, Awer, Campaka, Gamiyel (Gamnyial), Gamomeng, Gamsugi (Gamsungi), Goal, Golago Kusuma, Hoku Hoku Gam, Idam Gamlamo (Idamgamlamo), Loce, Ngaon, Sidodadi, Taba Campaka, Taraudu Kusu, Tibobo
Halmahera Selatan	Bacan		Amasing Kali, Amasing Kota, Amasing Kota Barat, Amasing Kota Utara, Awanggoa, Belang Belang, Hidayat, Indomut, Kaputusan, Labuha, Marabose, Suma Tinggi, Sumae, Tomori
Halmahera Selatan	Bacan Barat		Indari, Kokotu, Kusubibi, Nang, Nondang, Tawabi, Wiring
Halmahera Selatan	Bacan Barat Utara		Geti Baru, Geti Lama, Gilalang, Jojame, Lolarogurua (Gorua Lolaro / Lolorogurua), Nusa Babullah (Nusa Babi), Sidopo, Yaba
Halmahera Selatan	Bacan Selatan		Dgandasuli (Gandasuli), Kubung, Kupal, Makian (Kampung Makian), Mandawong (Mandaong), Panamboang, Papaloang, Sawadai, Tembal, Tuwokona (Tuakona)
Halmahera Selatan	Bacan Timur		Babang, Bori, Goro Goro, Kaireu, Nyonyifi, Sabatang, Sali Kecil, Sayoang, Timlonga, Wayamiga
Halmahera Selatan	Bacan Timur Selatan		Liaro, Pigaraja, Silang, Tabajaya, Tabangame, Wayakuba, Wayaua
Halmahera Selatan	Bacan Timur Tengah		Bibinoi, Songa, Tabapoma, Tawa, Tomara, Tutupa, Wayatim
Halmahera Selatan	Gane Barat		Balitata, Bumi Rahmat, Cango, Doro, Koititi, Lemo Lemo, Oha, Papaceda, Saketa, Tabamasa
Halmahera Selatan	Gane Barat Selatan		Awis, Dowora, Gane Dalam, Jibubu, Pasipalele (Pasi Palele), Sekely, Tawa, Yamli (Yamly)
Halmahera Selatan	Gane Barat Utara		Batulak, Boso, Dolik, Fulai (Jikolamo/Fulay), Gumirah (Gumira), Moloku, Nurjihat, Posi Posi, Samat, Samo, Suka Damai, Tokaka
Halmahera Selatan	Gane Timur		Akelamo, Batonam, Foya, Foya Tobaru, Kebun Raja, Kotalow, Lalubi, Maffa, Sumber Makmur, Tanjung Jere, Tobaru, Wosi
Halmahera Selatan	Gane Timur Selatan		Gaimu, Gane Luar, Kuwo, Ranga Ranga, Sawat
Halmahera Selatan	Gane Timur Tengah		Bisui, Lelewi, Luim, Matuting, Matuting Tanjung, Tabahidayah, Tabahijrah, Tagia (Tagea)
Halmahera Selatan	Kasiruta Barat		Arumamang, Bisori, Doko (Doku), Imbu Imbu, Kukupang (Kakupang), Lata Lata, Marikapal, Palamea, Sengga Baru, Sidanga
Halmahera Selatan	Kasiruta Timur		Jeret, Kasiruta Dalam, Kou Balabala (Koubalabala), Loleo Jaya, Loleo Mekar (Loleomekar), Marituso (Maritosu), Tawa, Tutuhu (Tutuha)
Halmahera Selatan	Kayoa		Bajo, Buli, Dorolamo, Gafi, Gunange, Guruapin, Karamat, Kida, Laigoma, Lelei, Ligua, Siko, Talimau, Tawabi
Halmahera Selatan	Kayoa Barat		Bokimiake, Busua, Fofao, Hatejawa
Halmahera Selatan	Kayoa Selatan		Laluin, Ngute Ngute, Orimakurunga, Pasir Putih, Posi Posi, Sagawele
Halmahera Selatan	Kayoa Utara		Ake Jailolo, Gayap, Laromabati (Loromabati), Modayama, Ngokomalako, Wayasipang
Halmahera Selatan	Kepulauan Botanglomang		Bajo, Batutaga, Kampung Baru, Paisumbaos (Pasimbaos), Prapakanda, Sawanakar (Sawangakar/Sawangkang), Tanjung Obit, Toin
Halmahera Selatan	Kepulauan Joronga		Gonone, Kakupang (Kukupang), Kurunga, Liboba Hijrah, Pulau Gala, Tawabi, Yomen
Halmahera Selatan	Makian Barat		Bobawae, Malapat, Mateketen, Ombawa, Sebelei, Talapaon, Tegono
Halmahera Selatan	Mandioli Selatan		Bahu, Galala, Jiko (Jeko), Lele, Tabalema, Yoyok
Halmahera Selatan	Mandioli Utara		Akedabo, Bobo, Indong, Leleongusu (Loleongusu), Pelita (Pelita Jaya), Waya
Halmahera Selatan	Obi		Air Mangga Indah, Akegula, Anggai, Baru, Buton, Jikotamo, Kawasi, Laiwui, Sambiki
Halmahera Selatan	Obi Barat		Alam Kenanga, Alam Pelita, Jikohai (Jikohay), Manatahan, Soa Sangaji (Soasangaji), Tapa
Halmahera Selatan	Obi Selatan		Bobo, Fluk, Gambaru, Loleo, Mano, Ocimaloleo, Soligi, Wayaloar
Halmahera Selatan	Obi Timur		Kello (Kelo), Sum, Susepe (Sosepe), Wooi
Halmahera Selatan	Obi Utara		Cap, Galala, Madopolo (Madapolo), Madopolo Barat (Madapolo Barat), Madopolo Timur (Madapolo Timur), Pasir Putih, Waringi
Halmahera Selatan	Pulau Makian		Dalam, Dauri, Gitang, Gorup, Gurua, Kyowor, Matentengin, Ploili, Rabutdaiyo, Sangapati, Suma, Waigitang, Wailoa, Walo, Waykion
Halmahera Tengah	Patani		Baka Jaya, Kipai, Wailegi, Yeisowo, Yondeliu
Halmahera Tengah	Patani Barat		Banemo, Bobane Indah, Bobane Jaya, Mareala (Moreala), Sibenpope (Sibenpopo)
Halmahera Tengah	Patani Timur		Damuli, Masure, Nursifa, Palo, Peniti, Sakam
Halmahera Tengah	Patani Utara		Bilifitu, Gemia, Maliforo, Pantura Jaya, Tepeleo, Tepeleo Batudua
Halmahera Tengah	Pulau Gebe		Elfanun, Kacepi, Kapaleo, Sanafi, Sonof Kacepo, Umera, Umiyal, Yang
Halmahera Tengah	Weda		Fidy Jaya, Goeng, Nurweda, Nusliko, Sidanga, Weda / Wedana, Were
Halmahera Tengah	Weda Selatan		Air Salobar, Kluting Jaya, Lembah Asri, Loleo, Sosowomo, Sumber Sari, Tilope (Tiloppe), Wairoro Indah
Halmahera Tengah	Weda Tengah		Kobe, Kulo Jaya, Lililef Sawai (Lelilef Sawai), Lililef Waibulan (Lelilef Waibulen), Sawai Itepo, Woejerana, Woekob
Halmahera Tengah	Weda Timur		Dotte, Kotalo, Messa, Yeke
Halmahera Tengah	Weda Utara		Fritu, Gemaf, Kiya, Sagea, Waleh
Halmahera Timur	Kota Maba		Maba Sangaji (Gotowasi), Soa Laipoh, Soa Sangaji, Soagimalaha (Soa Gimalaha), Tewil, Wai Lukum (Wailukum)
Halmahera Timur	Maba		Baburino, Buli, Buli Asal, Buli Karya, Gamesan, Geltoli, Pekaulan, Sailal, Teluk Buli, Wayafly (Wayafli / Wayamli)
Halmahera Timur	Maba Selatan		Bicoli, Gotowasi, Kasuba, Loleo Lamo (Loloelamo), Momole, Pateley (Petelei), Sil, Sowoli, Waci
Halmahera Timur	Maba Tengah		Babasaram, Bangul, Bebsili, Beringin Lamo (Baringin), Dorolamo, Gaifoli, Marasipno, Maratana (Marathana Jaya ), Miaf, Tatangapu, Wayamli (Wayamly), Yawanli
Halmahera Timur	Maba Utara		Doromoi, Dorosago (Dorosagu), Jara-jara (Jarajara), Lili, Lolasita, Patlean, Patlean Jaya, Pumlanga, Sosolat, Wasileo
Halmahera Timur	Wasile		Batu Raja, Bulapapo (Gulapapo), Bumi Restu, Cemara Jaya, Mekar Sari, Subaim, Waisuba
Halmahera Timur	Wasile Selatan		Ake Jawi, Bina Gara (Binagara), Bukutio, Ekor, Ekorino, Fayaul, Ino Jaya, Jiko Moi, Loleba, Minamin, Nanas, Nusa Ambu (Nusa Ambo), Nusa Jaya, Pintatu, Saolat, Saramake (Saramaake), Sondo-Sondo, Tabanalow (Tabanalou / Tabanoli), Talaga Jaya, Tanure, Tomares, Waijoi, Wasile, Yawal
Halmahera Timur	Wasile Tengah		Boki Miake (Bokimaake), Foli (Foly), Hate Tabako (Hatetabako), Kakaraino, Lolobata, Nyaolako, Puao, Silalaysang (Silalayang)
Halmahera Timur	Wasile Timur		Akedaga (Ake Daga), Daka Ino, Dodaga, Rawamangun, Sidomulyo, Tobo Ino (Toboino), Tutuling Jaya, Woka Jaya
Halmahera Timur	Wasile Utara		Bololo, Dowongi Jaya, Helaitetor, Iga, Labi Labi, Majiko Tongone, Marimoi, Tatam
Halmahera Utara	Galela		Barataku, Mamuya, Pune, Simau, Soa Sio, Towara (Torawa), Toweka
Halmahera Utara	Galela Barat		Dokulamo, Duma, Gotalamo, Kira, Makete, Ngidiho, Roko, Samuda (Samudra), Soatobaru
Halmahera Utara	Galela Selatan		Bale, Igobula, Ori, Seki, Soakonora, Togawa, Togawabesi
Halmahera Utara	Galela Utara		Beringin Jaya, Bobisingo (Bobi Singo), Dodowo, Jare (Jere), Jere Tua, Lalonga, Limau, Pelita, Salimuli, Saluta, Togasa, Tutumaloleo
Halmahera Utara	Kao		Biang, Goruang, Jati, Kao, Kukumutuk, Kusu, Kusu Lofra, Patang, Popon, Sasur, Soa Sangaji Dim-Dim (Soasangaji Dim Dim), Sumber Agung, Waringin Lamo, Waringin Lelewi
Halmahera Utara	Kao Barat		Bailengit, Beringin Agung, Gaga Apok (Gagaapok), Kai, Leleseng (Lelesang), Makarti, Margomolyo (Margomoyo), Momoda, Ngoali, Parseba, Pitago, Sangaji Jaya, Soa Hukum, Soa Maetek (Soamaetek), Takimo, Toboulamo, Tolabit, Toliwang, Torawat, Tuguis, Wonosari
Halmahera Utara	Kao Teluk		Akelamo Raya (Akelamo Kao), Barumadehe, Bobane Igo (Bobaneigo), Dum Dum, Gamsungi, Kuntum Mekar, Makaeling, Pasir Putih, Tetewang, Tiowor, Tobanoma
Halmahera Utara	Kao Utara		Bobale, Bori, Boulamo, Daru, Doro, Dowongimaiti, Gamlaha, Gulo, Pediwang (Pidiwang), Tunuo, Warudu, Wateto
Halmahera Utara	Loloda Kepulauan		Cera, Dagasuli, Dama, Dedeta, Dowonggila, Fitako, Jikolamo, Salube, Tobo Tobo, Tuakara
Halmahera Utara	Loloda Utara		Apule (Apulea), Asimiro (Asmiro), Dorume, Dotia (Doitia), Galao, Gisik, Igo, Kailupa, Kapa Kapa, Momojiu, Ngajam, Pacao (Pocao), Podol, Posi Posi, Supu, Tate, Teru-Teru, Wori Moi
Halmahera Utara	Malifut		Balisosang, Bobawa, Bukit Tinggi, Gayok, Mailoa, Malapa, Matsa, Ngofa Bobawa (Ngofabobawa), Ngofa Gita (Ngofagita), Ngofa Kiaha (Ngofakiaha), Peleri, Sabaleh, Samsuma, Soma, Sosol / Malifut (Sosol), Tabobo (Tobobo), Tafasoho, Tagono, Tahane, Talapao, Terpadu, Wangeotek (Wangeotak)
Halmahera Utara	Tobelo		Gamsungi, Gosoma, Gura, Kakara (Kakara A), Kumo, MKCM, Rawajaya, Tagalaya, Wari, Wari Ino
Halmahera Utara	Tobelo Barat		Birinoa, Kusuri, Sukamaju, Togoliua, Wangongira
Halmahera Utara	Tobelo Selatan		Efi Efi, Gamhoku, Kakara B, Kupa Kupa, Kupa Kupa Selatan, Leleoto, Lemah Ino, Paca, Pale, Talaga Paca, Tioua, Tobe, Tomahalu (Toma Halu)
Halmahera Utara	Tobelo Tengah		Kali Upa, Kalipitu, Lina Ino, Mahia (Wosi/Wosia Tengah), Pitu, Tanjung Niara (Wosi/Wosia Selatan), Upa, WKO, Wosi (Wosia)
Halmahera Utara	Tobelo Timur		Gonga, Katana, Mawea, Meti, Todokuiha, Yaro
Halmahera Utara	Tobelo Utara		Gorua, Gorua Selatan, Gorua Utara, Kokota Jaya (Kokotua Jaya), Luari, Popilo, Popilo Utara (Popila Utara), Ruko, Tolonua Selatan, Tolonuo
Kepulauan Sula	Mangoli Barat		Dofa, Johor (Johor Perda), Lekokadai, Lekosula, Lelyaba, Pas Ipa, Pelita
Kepulauan Sula	Mangoli Selatan		Auponhia, Buya, Kaporo, Waikafia, Wailab
Kepulauan Sula	Mangoli Tengah		Buruakol, Capalulu, Jere, Mangoli, Paslal, Urifola, Wai U, Wailoba, Waitulia
Kepulauan Sula	Mangoli Timur		Karamat Titdoy, Kau/Kou (Kow), Naflo, Waitamela, Waitina
Kepulauan Sula	Mangoli Utara		Falabisahaya, Minaluli, Modapia, Modapuhi, Modapuhi Trans, Pastabulu, Saniahaya
Kepulauan Sula	Mangoli Utara Timur		Kawata, Pelita Jaya, Waisakai, Waisum
Kepulauan Sula	Sanana		Fagudu, Falahu, Fatcei, Fogi, Mangon, Pastina, Umaloya, Wai Ipa, Waibau, Waihama, Wailau
Kepulauan Sula	Sanana Utara		Bajo, Fokalik, Fukweu, Malbufa, Man-Gega, Pohea, Wainin
Kepulauan Sula	Sulabesi Barat		Kabau Darat, Kabau Pantai, Nahi, Ona, Paratina, Wai Ina
Kepulauan Sula	Sulabesi Selatan		Fuata, Skom, Wai Tamua, Waigai, Wainib
Kepulauan Sula	Sulabesi Tengah		Bega, Fat Iba, Manaf, Soamole, Waiboga, Waiman
Kepulauan Sula	Sulabesi Timur		Baleha, Fatkauyon, Sama, Waigoiyofa, Wailia, Waisepa
Pulau Morotai	Morotai Jaya		Aru, Bere Bere Kecil, Cempaka, Cendana, Gorugo, Hapo, Libano, Loleo, Pangeo, Podimor Padange, Sopi, Sopi Majiko, Titigogoli, Towara
Pulau Morotai	Morotai Selatan		Aha, Daeo, Daeo Majiko, Darame, Daruba, Dehegila, Falila, Galo Galo, Gotalamo, Joubela, Juanga, Koloray (Kolorai), Mandiri, Momojiu, Morodadi, Muhajirin, Nakamura, Pandanga (Pandangan), Pilowo, Sabala, Sabatai Baru, Sabatai Tua, Totodoku, Wawama, Yayasan
Pulau Morotai	Morotai Selatan Barat		Aru Burung, Aru Irian, Bobula, Cio Dalam, Cio Gerong, Cio Maloleo, Cucumare, Leo Leo, Lou Madoro, Ngele Ngele Besar, Ngele Ngele Kecil, Posi-Posi (Posi Posi Rao), Raja, Sami Nyamau (Saminyamau), Tiley (Tiley Kusu), Tiley Pantai, Tutuhu (Tuthu), Usbar Pantai, Waringin, Wayabula
Pulau Morotai	Morotai Timur		Buho Buho, Doku Mira, Gamlamo, Gosoma Maluku, Hino, Lifao, Mira, Rahmat, Sambiki Baru, Sambiki Tua (Sambiki), Sangowo, Sangowo Barat, Sangowo Timur, Seseli Jaya, Wewemo
Pulau Morotai	Morotai Utara		Bere Bere, Bido, Goa Hira, Gorua, Gorua Selatan, Kenari, Korago, Loleo Jaya, Lusuo (Losuo), Maba, Sakita, Tanjung Saleh, Tawakali, Yao
Pulau Taliabu	Lede		Balohang (Balahong), Langganu, Lede, Todoli, Tolong
Pulau Taliabu	Tabona		Fayaunana, Habunuha, Kabunu, Kataga, Peleng, Tabona, Wolio
Pulau Taliabu	Taliabu Barat		Bobong, Holbota, Kawalo, Kilong, Kramat, Limbo, Loho Bubba, Meranti Jaya (Maranti Jaya), Pancoran, Ratahaya, Talo, Wayo, Woyo
Pulau Taliabu	Taliabu Barat Laut		Beringin Jaya, Kasango, Nggele, Onemay (Oneway), Salati
Pulau Taliabu	Taliabu Selatan		Bahu, Bapenu, Galebo, Kilo, Maluli, Nggaki, Nggoli, Pancado, Sumbong
Pulau Taliabu	Taliabu Timur		Parigi, Penu, Samuya, Tubang
Pulau Taliabu	Taliabu Timur Selatan		Belo, Kamaya, Kawadang, Losseng, Mantarara, Sofan, Waikadai, Waikadai Sula, Waikoka
Pulau Taliabu	Taliabu Utara		Air Bulan, Air Kalimat, Bua Mbono (Mbono), Dege, Gela, Hai, Jorjoga, London, Mananga, Minton, Natang Kuning, Nunca, Nunu, Padang, Sahu, Tanjung Una, Tikong, Ufung, Wahe
Ternate	Kota Ternate Selatan		Bastiong Karance, Bastiong Talangame, Fitu, Gambesi, Jati, Jati Perumnas, Kalumata, Kayu Merah, Mangga Dua, Mangga Dua Utara, Ngade, Sasa, Tanah Tinggi, Tanah Tinggi Barat, Toboko, Tobona (Tabona), Ubo-Ubo
Ternate	Kota Ternate Tengah		Gamalama, Kalumpang, Kampung Pisang, Kota Baru, Makassar Barat (Makasar Barat), Makassar Timur (Makasar Timur), Maliaro, Marikurubu, Moya, Muhajirin, Salahuddin, Santiong, Stadion, Takoma, Tanah Raja
Ternate	Kota Ternate Utara		Akehuda, Dufa Dufa, Kasturian, Salero, Sangaji, Sangaji Utara, Sango, Soa, Soa Sio, Tabam, Tafure, Tarau, Toboleu, Tubo
Ternate	Moti		Figur, Moti Kota, Tadenas, Tafaga, Tafamutu, Takofi
Ternate	Pulau Batang Dua		Bido, Lelewi, Mayau, Pantai Sagu, Perum Bersatu, Tifure
Ternate	Pulau Hiri		Dorari Isa, Faudu, Mado, Tafraka, Togolobe, Tomajiko
Ternate	Pulau Ternate		Afe Taduma, Bula, Dorpedu, Foramadiahi, Jambula, Kastela, Kulaba, Loto, Rua, Sulamadaha, Takome, Tobololo, Togafo
Tidore Kepulauan	Oba		Bale, Gita, Koli, Kosa, Kususinopa, Payahe, Sigela Yef, Talagamori, Talasi, Todopa, Toseho, Tului, Woda
Tidore Kepulauan	Oba Selatan		Hager, Lifofa, Maidi, Nuku, Selamalofo, Tagalaya, Wama
Tidore Kepulauan	Oba Tengah		Akedotilou, Akeguraci, Akelamo, Akesai, Aketobatu, Aketobololo, Baringin Jaya, Fanaha, Lola, Siokona, Tadupi, Tauno, Togeme, Yehu
Tidore Kepulauan	Oba Utara		Ake Kolano, Ampera, Balbar, Bukit Durian, Galala, Garojou, Gosale, Guraping, Kaiyasa, Kusu, Oba, Sofifi, Somahode
Tidore Kepulauan	Tidore		Folarora, Gamtufkange, Goto, Gurabunga, Indonesiana, Seli, Soadara, Soasio, Tambula, Tomagoba, Topo, Topo Tiga, Tuguwaji
Tidore Kepulauan	Tidore Selatan		Dokiri, Gurabati, Mare Gam (Maregam), Mare Kofo (Marekofo), Toloa, Tomalou, Tongowai, Tuguiha
Tidore Kepulauan	Tidore Timur		Cobodoe, Dowora, Doyado, Jiko Cobo, Kalaodi, Mafututu, Tosa
Tidore Kepulauan	Tidore Utara		Afa Afa, Bobo (Bobo Menjadi), Fobaharu, Gubu Kusuma, Jaya, Maitara, Maitara Selatan, Maitara Tengah, Maitara Utara, Mareku, Ome, Rum, Rum Balibunga, Sirongo Folaraha
