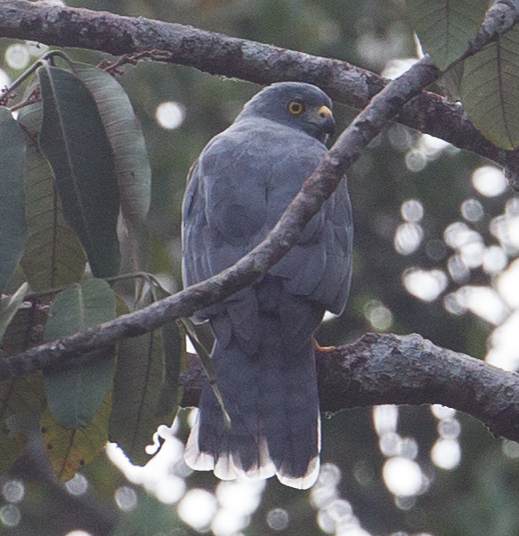

Conservation status
- Near Threatened (IUCN 3.1)

Scientific classification
- Kingdom: Animalia
- Phylum: Chordata
- Class: Aves
- Order: Accipitriformes
- Family: Accipitridae
- Genus: Tachyspiza
- Species: T. henicogramma

Binomial name
- Tachyspiza henicogramma (Gray, GR, 1861)
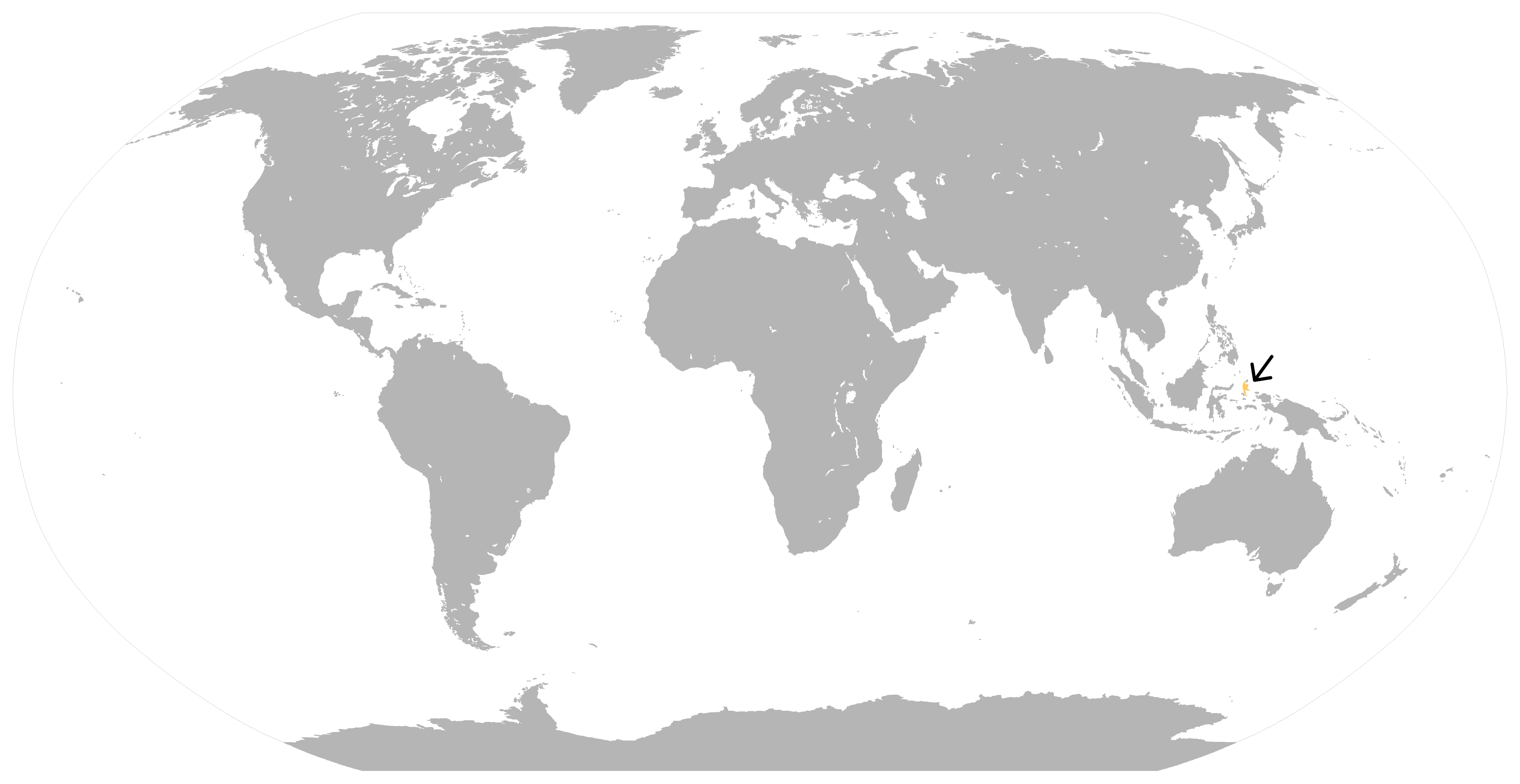

= Moluccan goshawk =

Moluccan goshawk Halmaheran goshawk

Species of bird

The Moluccan goshawk or Halmaheran goshawk (Tachyspiza henicogramma) is a species of bird of prey in the family Accipitridae. This species was formerly placed in the genus Accipiter.

== Taxonomy and systematics ==
=== Taxonomy ===
The Moluccan goshawk is part of the class Aves, which contains all the world's birds from the Ostrich to the hummingbird. It is in the Order Accipitriformes, the order includes most of the birds of prey like hawks, eagles, osprey, vultures, and kites, but not the falcons. It is in the family Accipitridae, one of the three families of this order. Its new scientific name is Tachyspiza henicogramma, as it was previously named Accipiter Henicogrammus.

==== Related species ====
They are a monotypic species so there is only one population for this species and isn't divided into subspecies, this is most likely due to their limited range and genetic flow between each subpopulation.

Moluccan goshawks are among 27 species of the genus Tachyspiza. Related goshawk species that live in the same area asT. hennicogramma is the variable goshawk (Tachyspiza hiogaster). The Moluccan goshawk was also once thought to be the same species as the brown goshawk (Tachyspiza fasciata), and the grey goshawk (Tachyspiza novaehollandiae), but has since been given its own species state due to difference in plumage, structure, and difference in the range.

==== Naming history ====
The Tachyspiza genus has been Inactive for almost 200 years since its introduction by Kaup in 1844. In 2024, DNA and morphological testing by Catanach et al. (2024) on the Accipiter genus found that 27 of its species were different from the rest of the genus. This led to the reactivation of the Tachyspiza genus and renaming of the Moluccan goshawk from Accipiter henicogrammus to Tachyspiza henicogramma, along with the 26 other hawks who all have shorter toes and talons than Accipiter species.

Historically the Moluccan goshawk has been referred to as the Grey's goshawk, and the Moluccan barred goshawk. The Moluccan Goshawk has also been called the Halmaheran goshawk as it is endemic to Halmahera in the Moluccan Islands in Indonesia.

== Description ==
=== Identification ===
They are a mid-sized raptors with short, rounded wingtips, relatively long tails, a heavy bill, and long legs but short and rather weak toes. Their short wings cover only the base of their long tail. Adults have yellow eyes, beak, and legs, while for juveniles it is paler, and greener/yellow. They have a wingspan of about 1.7 times the total length. Males will have a wingspan of 21.7 to 23.2 cm and, a head-to-tail length of 19.2 to 21.9 cm, while females will be 2-20% larger with a wingspan of 23.7 to 26.0 cm and head-to-tail of 21.9 to 23.0 cm.

Not much is known about their vocalization process, as the recordings of the bird that are known are unclear as to what the bird was doing at the time. The only known recording (context unknown, but perhaps territorial call) is of a rather sharp, insistent, rising series of whistles.

=== Plumage ===
Both sexes are very similar in color and only differ in size. All dark blue-slate on head and upperparts, but slightly paler cheeks, some white showing on the nape, whitish or chestnut mottling on the throat, and many inconspicuous darker tail-bars; in contrast, breast and abdomen are all cinnamon-chestnut rather obscurely barred with white, with some variation. Females may be slightly browner in their upperbody than males.

Juveniles have strongly patterned blackish brown above, with paler, white-streaked heads, black-spotted nape, and broad bars of light and dark on flight feathers and tail, as well as thin tips of rufous and bars of white on back and coverts; apart from white throat with few dark spots, all creamy below, boldly barred with blackish brown on breast and with rufous on abdomen and thighs.

Not much is known about their moulting process, but it is believed that they moult directly into their adult plumage from their juvenile plumage.

=== Similar species ===
The Moluccan goshawk is often confused with three other species located in the Moluccan area. Closest in size is the relatively longer-winged and shorter-tailed Grey goshawk: adult have a paler grey on their head, back, and wing, with a reddish-brown collar around their neck; juveniles are rather like juvenile Moluccan goshawk, but much less strongly patterned above and less barred on their underside, with streaked breast and contrasting reddish-brown barred flanks. Then the adult rufous-necked sparrowhawk, altogether smaller and shorter-tailed, also has a clear reddish-brown collar, whiter throat, pinker breast and greyish belly; juvenile blackish above with reddish-brown edges, all boldly but relatively lightly streaked below, and in-flight body paler than underwings. Finally, there is the rather larger, much longer-winged and relatively short-tailed Meyer's goshawk is black and white (or all black) when adult, and more rufous below and streaked when juvenile.

== Distribution and habitat ==
=== Distribution ===
The Moluccan goshawk is endemic to Halmahera, Indonesia. It is found on the islands of North Maluku, Halmahera, and Ternate, Indonesia. It was believed that the species was also present on other islands like the islands of Morotai and Bacan, but due to decline, it is believed to be extinct from these islands. 2 to 100 subpopulations are estimated to be spread out amongst these 3 areas of Indonesia.

=== Habitat ===
The preferred habitat of the Moluccan goshawk will be in forested areas on these islands. Their preferred forest type will be in hills and mountains, as well as being occasionally seen in forest edges located from 200 m to a maximum of 1300 m in elevation. It was reported that they could be found in secondary forests but during a survey of Aketajawe Lolobata National Park, all sightings were from primary forests.

== Behaviour and ecology ==
=== Breeding ===
Little is known of their breeding techniques. The bird is usually solitary but has been seen in pairs at moments.

=== Food and feedings ===
The Moluccan goshawk diet consists mainly of reptiles (lizards), small birds and mammals, and insects (such as grasshoppers). This goshawk has relatively weak feet and a small degree of reversed size dimorphism (RSD), indicating that they are not primarily bird-eaters. They hunt by laying very still on an inconspicuous perch, making a quick dash to surprise prey.

=== Threats ===
The Moluccan goshawk has a shorter range and smaller land space for habitat inside its current range compared to other Goshawks, this led to many threats to its species which has led to the decline of the species in the past decade. These threats lead to ecosystem conversion and degradation.

The primary threats to the species are related to habitat loss through commercial logging for timber, and clearance for shifting agriculture, mining, settlements and plantations of coconut, clove, nutmeg and timber species. Further habitat loss is due to the urbanization of North Maluku province which is undergoing rapid development which leads to a higher rate of forest conversion to agricultural fields, luckily it was found that forest loss today is viewed as negligible. The conversion of agricultural land from forest, opening forest for roads, and more shrub and grassland has unfortunately led to an increase in the frequency of wildfires, which devastates the natural habitat of the Goshawk at unprecedented rates.

These threats have led to the decline of the Moluccan goshawk population and today there are only about 1500-7000 adult individuals left, with 2 to 100 subpopulations. This number is based on the IUCN's 2020 assessment, so this number could be lower today.

== Relationship with humans ==
The Moluccan goshawk is still being used as a pet and for horticulture locally and nationally in its habitat, but it is illegal for other countries than Molucca to harbour the goshawk.

== Status ==
The International Union for Conservation of Nature (IUCN) has declared the Moluccan goshawk as a near-threatened species since 2014. Its first Red List assessment by the IUCN came in 2004 and was declared as Least concern. The assessments of the species in 2008, 2009, and 2012 also concluded the species to be of the least concern status. Then since 2014 (2014, 2016, and 2020), it has been listed as Near threatened. This status is based on its small and restricted population undergoing a suspected decline over a three-generation period (one generation is around 5.1 years).

== Conservation effort ==
Conservation efforts towards the Moluccan goshawk are very limited at the moment. These efforts include in-place land/water protection conservation sites across the entire range of the Goshawk population and international management and trade control of the species.

Further actions to protect the species include proposed surveys to monitor the population trend. This includes tracking the rate of habitat loss through regular studies of satellite images and increasing the area of suitable habitat with protected status.
