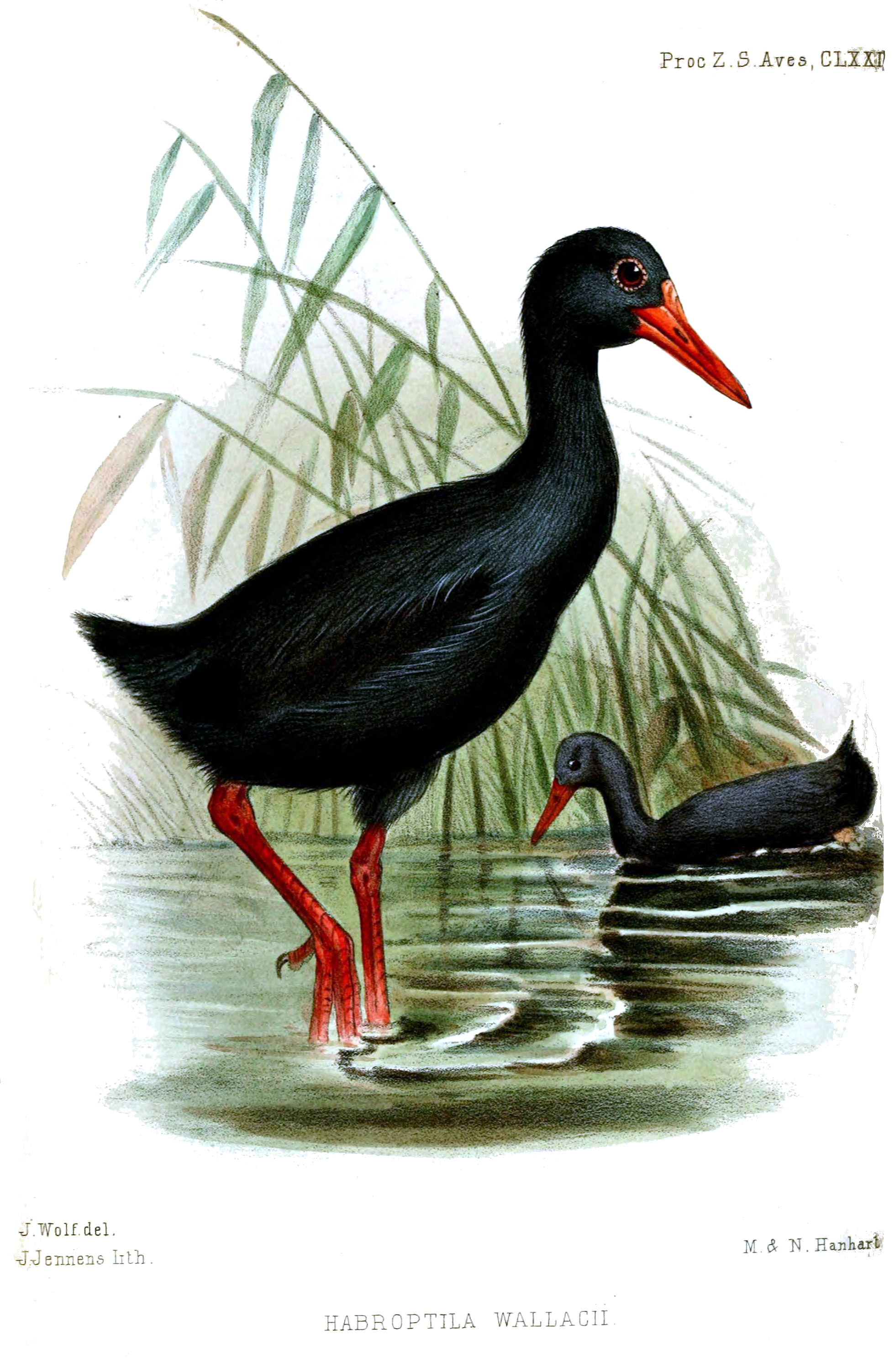
- Adult by Joseph Wolf, 1859

Conservation status
- Vulnerable (IUCN 3.1)

Scientific classification
- Kingdom: Animalia
- Phylum: Chordata
- Class: Aves
- Order: Gruiformes
- Family: Rallidae
- Genus: Gallirallus
- Species: G. wallacii

Binomial name
- Gallirallus wallacii (Gray, GR, 1861)
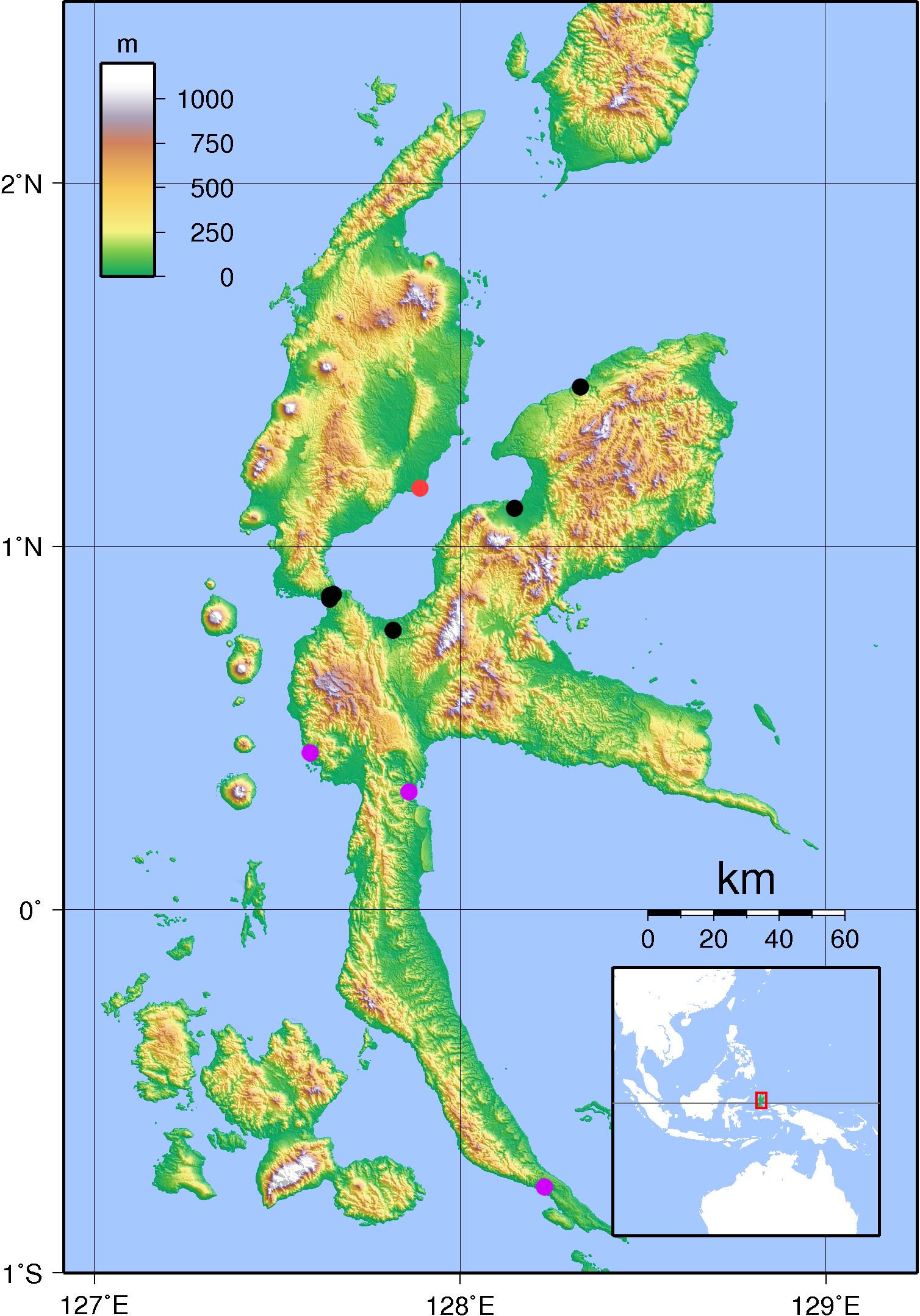
- Recent records pre-1950 records Kao town Inset shows location of Halmahera within Indonesia

Synonyms
- Habroptila wallacii

= Invisible rail =

Large flightless bird endemic to Indonesia

The invisible rail, Wallace's rail, or drummer rail (Gallirallus wallacii) is a large flightless rail that is endemic to the island of Halmahera in Northern Maluku, Indonesia, where it inhabits impenetrable sago swamps adjacent to forests. Its plumage is predominantly dark slate-grey, and the bare skin around its eyes, the long, thick bill, and the legs are all bright red. Its call is a low drumming sound which is accompanied by wing-beating. The difficulty of seeing this shy bird in its dense habitat means that information on its behaviour is limited.

Recorded dietary items include sago shoots and insects, and it also swallows small stones to help break up its food. It is apparently monogamous, but little else is known of its courtship behaviour. The only known nest was a shallow bowl in the top of a rotting tree stump that was lined with wood chips and dry leaves. The two young chicks were entirely covered in black down typical of precocial newly hatched rails. The estimated population of 3,500–15,000 birds and the restricted range mean that the invisible rail is classified as vulnerable by the International Union for Conservation of Nature (IUCN). Habitat loss has occurred through the harvesting of sago and conversion of the wetlands to rice cultivation, and the rail is eaten by local people. The described nest was in an area frequented by local villagers, so the rail may be more adaptable to habitat changes than had been thought.

== Taxonomy ==
The rails are a large and very widespread family, with nearly 150 species. They are small to medium-sized, terrestrial or wetland birds, and their short bodies are often flattened laterally to help them move through dense vegetation. Island species readily become flightless; of 53 extant or recently extinct taxa restricted to islands, 32 have lost the ability to fly.

The invisible rail was formally described by the English zoologist George Robert Gray in 1860 as Habroptila wallacii. The species is now placed in the genus Gallirallus that was introduced in 1841 by the French ornithologist Frédéric de Lafresnaye. The genus name Gallirallus is a portmanteau of the genera Gallus that had been introduced by Mathurin Jacques Brisson in 1760 for the fowl, and the genus Rallus that had been introduced by Carl Linnaeus in 1758 for the rails. The specific epithet wallacii commemorates British zoologist Alfred Russel Wallace. Local names include "soisa", "tibiales" and "rèie".

This rail is related to the New Guinea flightless rail, Megacrex inepta, and the chestnut rail, Gallirallus castaneoventris, all three Australasian genera probably being derived from Amaurornis ancestors. Storrs Olson argued that the genus Megacrex was so similar to Habroptila that Megacrex should be considered a junior synonym of Habroptila, resulting in two species in the genus. This was further lumped in Sidney Dillon Ripley's 1977 monograph of the Rallidae; he included Habroptila within the large genus Rallus. This suggestion was not accepted by Gerlof Fokko Mees, who pointed out distinct differences in the shape and structure of the bill. A 2012 molecular phylogenetic analysis based on mitochondrial DNA sequence similarity found that Habroptila is part of evolutionary radiation within the broad genus Gallirallus that took place around 400,000 years ago in the region. A 2014 genetic study found that it formed a clade with the extinct Hawkins's rail of the Chatham Islands, New Zealand, the divergence was estimated to have taken place around 10 million years ago, this clade was in turn sister to Gallirallus.

== Description ==
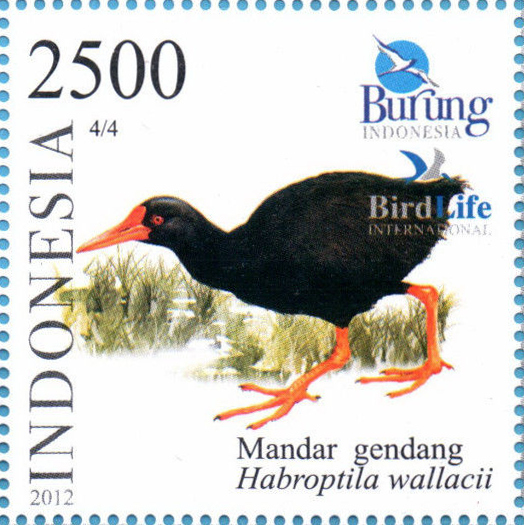
Habroptila wallacii on a 2012 Indonesian stamp

The invisible rail is a large, 33 to 40 cm (13–16 in) long, flightless bird. The adult has a mainly dark slate-grey body, dark brown plumage on the lower back, rump and wings, and a black uppertail. Its underparts are slightly paler slate-grey than the back, and the bare skin around the eye, the long, thick bill and the strong legs are bright red. It has a small spine at the bend of the wings. The sexes are identical in appearance; the plumage of fledged immature birds has not been described.

The invisible rail is superficially similar to the purple swamphen, Porphyrio porphyrio, which has recently been found in Halmahera, but that species is larger, with a short, thick red bill and a red forehead shield; it also has purple underparts and a white undertail. The invisible rail is different from the Calayan rail, Gallirallus calayanensis, in that it is larger and lacks the barred plumage of that species; there is no overlap between the ranges of the two species.

The call is a low drumming, accompanied by a tuk, tuk, tuk made with the wings. The nature of the vocalisation led to a local legend that the sound is made by the bird beating on a hollow tree or branch with its feet. Gerd Heinrich noted the local name "soisa", meaning drum, and described the call as being a subdued drumming purre – purre – purre – purre – purre which sometimes ends in a loud shrill scream. The bird also produced a dull hum similar to the voice of the banded pig (Sus scrofa vittatus) and reminiscent of the call of the snoring rail (Aramidopsis plateni). Calling is most frequent in the early morning or late evening, and a human tapping a sago stem with a machete may elicit a response from the bird. A quieter version of the call is given at the nest. Other sounds attributed to this rail, such as loud screams, may be incorrect, since they are like those produced by the pale-vented bush-hen (Amaurornis moluccana).

== Distribution and habitat ==
The invisible rail inhabits the dense, spiky sago swamps of Halmahera, particularly where forest adjoins the boggy areas. Claims that the rail occurs in alang-alang grass are thought to have arisen from confusion with the pale-vented bush-hen. German ornithologist Gerd Heinrich, who prepared for his Halmahera trip by rolling in stinging nettles, wrote of the sago swamp habitat in the 1930s:

I am solidly confident no European has ever seen this rail alive, for that requires such a degree of toughening and such demands on oneself as I cannot so easily attribute to others. Habroptila is shielded by the awful thorns of the sago swamps... In this thorn wilderness, I walked barefoot and half-naked for weeks.

Sightings of the rail from 1950 to 2003 were from a restricted area of West Halmahera Regency, at the base of the western peninsula of the island, but it was recorded prior to 1950 as far as the southern point of Halmahera. More recent records showed that it is still present in a significantly larger area, including the northeast of the island, and locals claim that it also occurs in the swamps near Kao, in the northwest.

The invisible rail is highly dependent on sago swamp habitats, which are increasingly under threat from human activities. Large-scale deforestation and the conversion of swamp areas for agriculture, particularly for palm oil plantations, have led to significant habitat loss. Additionally, climate change may further impact the species by altering rainfall patterns and increasing temperatures, potentially reducing the availability of suitable wetland areas.

== Behaviour ==
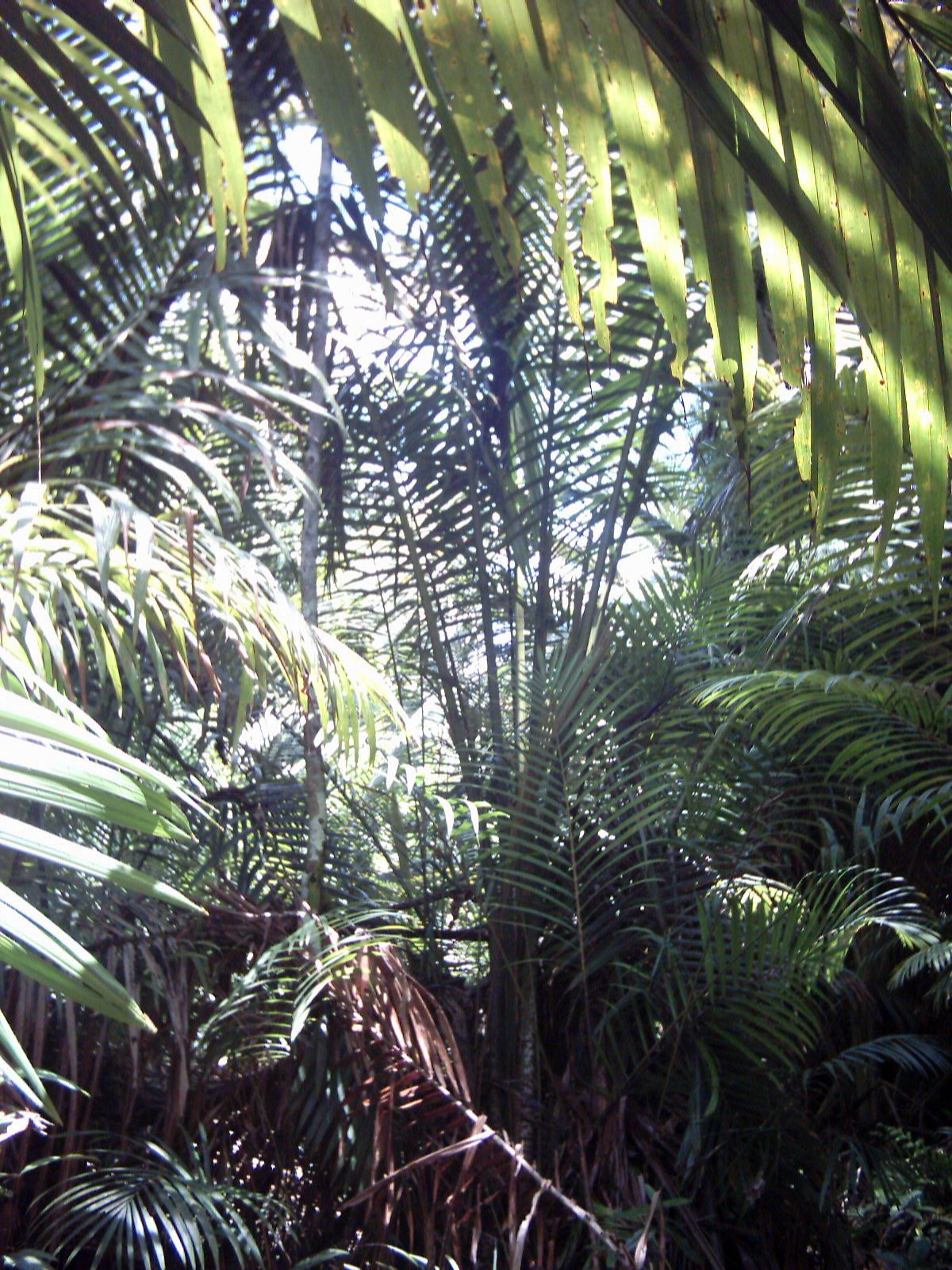
Sago palms

The difficult habitat and retiring nature of the invisible rail mean that information on its lifestyle is sparse, and there are few confirmed sightings. Recorded food items include sago shoots and insects. It also feeds at cut sago plants, although it is unclear whether it is eating the decaying plant or searching for other edible items. It swallows small stones, as do all rails, to help break up its food in the gizzard.

The invisible rail is thought to be monogamous, but little else is known of its courtship behaviour prior to nesting. A report of four or five striped chicks was long thought to be incorrect, since such a plumage is not normal for rails. In this family, chicks are typically precocial, downy and black, with any ornamentation confined to the head, bare flesh, or specially modified plume feathers.

The issue was resolved in November 2010 when a nest was found in the top of a rotting tree stump, 1 m (39 in) above ground level and 46 m (151 ft) in from the edge of a dry swamp forest in Aketajawe-Lolobata National Park. The nest depression was 15 cm (5.9 in) in depth, with a lower layer of small wood chips at its base and a lining of dead leaves. The egg shells were brownish-white with dark brown and black markings of different sizes. The two very young chicks were entirely covered in black down, contrasting with a white pollux (the equivalent of the thumbnail on a human hand) and pink index nail. The bill was black with a white tip, and the legs were black-streaked brown. The eyes had grey irises and blue pupils. Rail chicks leave the nest soon after hatching, so the chicks were assumed to be only a day or two old.

== Status ==
Bird species with a restricted range are especially vulnerable to human activities, and eight of the 26 bird species occurring only in the Northern Maluku Endemic Bird Area are threatened, including the invisible rail. Almost a quarter of all rail species have conservation concerns, and flightless island species are particularly at risk, at least 15 species having become extinct since 1600. The estimated population of the invisible rail is 3,500–15,000 birds, and its restricted range and small population mean that the species is classified as vulnerable by the International Union for Conservation of Nature (IUCN), although this rail is so poorly known that it may be more common than the estimates suggest.

Habitat loss has occurred through commercial harvesting of the sago, or conversion to rice cultivation and fishponds. The rail is prized food for local people who catch it with traps made from strings of bark and hunt it with dogs. The only described nest was in an area well-used by local villagers, and the rail may be more adaptable to habitat changes than had been thought. There were also several sightings in northeast Halmahera in 2008 and 2011, extending the area in which this bird has been seen in recent years.

== Cited texts ==
- Taylor, Barry (1998). Rails. Illustrated by Ber Van Perlo. Robertsbridge, East Sussex: Pica / Christopher Helm. ISBN 978-1-873403-59-4.
