= Maba, Indonesia =

Maba
- Town
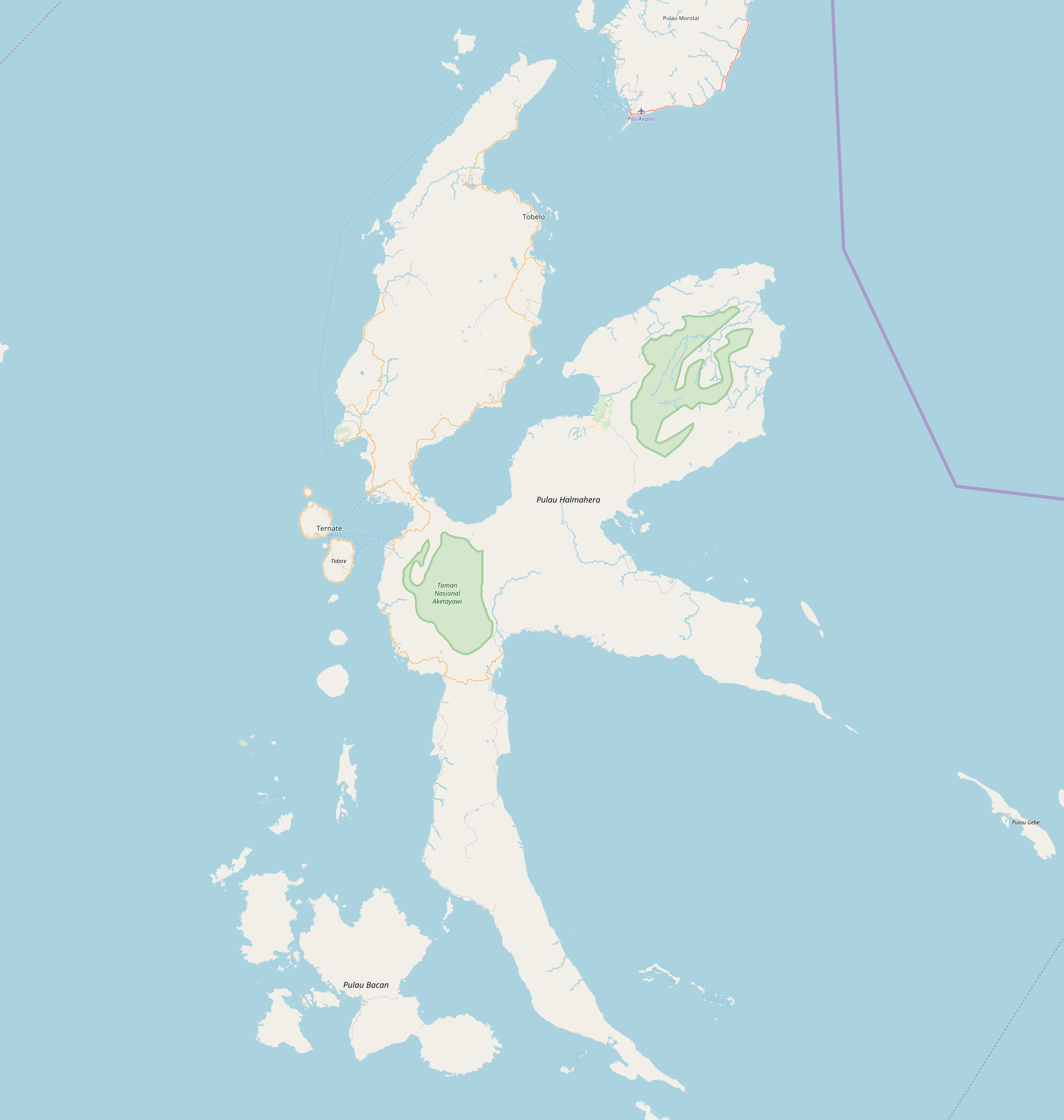
- Location in Halmahera, Maluku Islands and Indonesia Maba (Maluku) Maba (Indonesia)
- Coordinates: 0°42′N 128°18′E
- Country: Indonesia
- Region: Maluku Islands
- Province: North Maluku
- Regency: East Halmahera Regency

Government
  - Camat: Ailen Goeslaw

Area
  - Total: 354.52 km^{2} (136.88 sq mi)

Population (mid 2024 estimate)
  - Total: 2,405
  - Density: 6.784/km^{2} (17.57/sq mi)
- Time zone: UTC+9 (IEST)
- Area code: (+62) 921
- Villages: 10

Maba is a town in Kota Maba District, one of the ten administrative districts (kecamatan) in East Halmahera Regency, North Maluku Province of Indonesia. The town ("Maba Sangaji" or "Gotowasi") covers an area of 354.52 km^{2} and had a population of 2,405 at the mid 2024 estimates. It is the administrative centre for Kota Maba District as well as for East Halmahera Regency.

In all, there are five districts in the Maba area which together comprise the southeastern half of the regency (and of the northeastern peninsula of Halmahera Island, together with that portion of the southeastern peninsula within the regency); altogether they cover a land area of 3,662.22 km^{2}, with 49,419 inhabitants in mid 2024.

The most southerly of the five is South Maba District (Kecamatan Maba Selatan), which lies entirely on the southeastern peninsula of Halmahera Island, but also includes 23 small islands in Buli Bay or the Gulf of Buli (the large inlet from the Halmahera Sea which separates the northeastern and southeastern peninsulas of Halmahera), and is composed of nine villages (desa), all sharing the postcode of 97861. They are listed with their areas and their populations as at mid 2024.

Kode Wilayah	Name of Village (desa)	Area in km^{2}	Pop'n Estimate mid 2024
82.06.03.2001	Bicoli	188.47	1,507
82.06.03.2002	Waci	18.34	1,036
82.06.03.2003	Peteley	29.09	925
82.06.03.2004	Loleolamo	40.35	516
82.06.03.2005	Gotowasi	103.52	1,504
82.06.03.2010	Kasuba	4.79	799
82.06.03.2012	Momole	26.35	1,219
82.06.03.2013	Sil	72.05	581
82.06.03.2014	Sowoli	21.09	404
82.06.03	District totals	504.06	8,491

Kota Maba District, which includes the town of Maba, is mainly situated on the southeastern peninsula. It also includes several small islands in Buli Bay, and is composed of six towns and villages (desa), all sharing the postcode of 97862. They are listed from south to north with their areas and their populations as at mid 2024.

Kode Wilayah	Name of Village (desa)	Area in km^{2}	Pop'n Estimate mid 2024
82.06.10.2006	Tewil	1.57	559
82.06.10.2005	Maba Sangaji	354.52	2,405
82.06.10.2004	Soa Gimalaha	239.73	4,512
82.06.10.2001	Wailukum	91.58	1,400
82.06.10.2003	Soa Sangaji	147.90	1,200
82.06.10.2002	Soa Laipoh	155.98	1,067
82.06.10	District totals	991.29	11,143

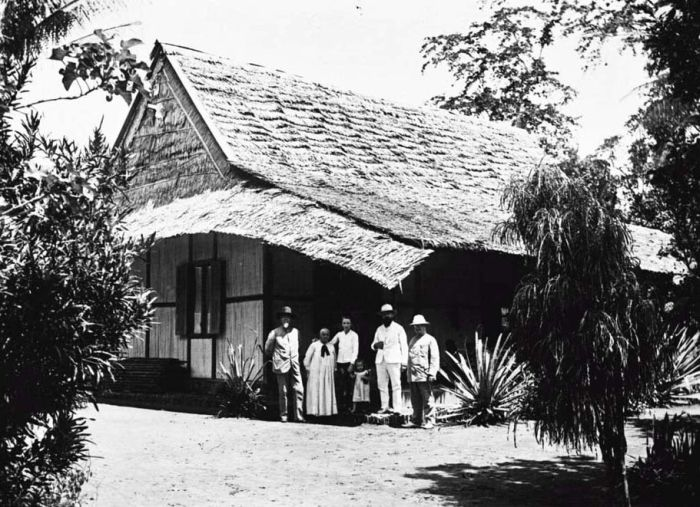
Missionaries in Buli (Maba District) around 1905-1914

Maba District (not to be confused with Kota Maba District described above) is situated to the north of Kota Maba District on the southern coast of the northeastern peninsula of Halmahera Island. It also includes several small islands in Buli Bay (notably the islands of Pulau Batuso, Pulau Gee and Pulau So) and is composed of ten towns and villages (desa), all sharing the postcode of 97860. They are listed from south to north with their areas and their populations as at mid 2024. Its administrative centre is the town of Buli, formerly Boeli. Most of the people in Buli are Christian and about a third of the population is Muslim.

Kode Wilayah	Name of Village (desa)	Area in km^{2}	Pop'n Estimate mid 2024
82.06.02.2001	Buli	26.30	2,525
82.06.02.2002	Buli Asal	60.75	940
82.06.02.2003	Buli Karya	23.40	2,045
82.06.02.2011	Wayafli	35.20	1,229
82.06.02.2012	Sailal	18.60	1,422
82.06.02.2013	Geltoli	180.44	2,557
82.06.02.2014	Pekaulang	41.40	514
82.06.02.2023	Teluk Buli	16.70	1,072
82.06.02.2024	Gamesan	1.80	770
82.06.02.2025	Baburino	35.83	511
82.06.02	District totals	440.42	13,585

The next, north of Maba District, is Central Maba District (Kecamatan Maba Tengah), which lies entirely on the northeastern peninsula of Halmahera Island, and is composed of twelve villages (desa), all sharing the postcode of 97863. They are listed with their areas and their populations as at mid 2024.

Kode Wilayah	Name of Village (desa)	Area in km^{2}	Pop'n Estimate mid 2024
82.06.08.2001	Wayamli	385.16	814
82.06.08.2002	Beringin Lamo	7.12	542
82.06.08.2003	Miaf	61.04	614
82.06.08.2004	Bangul	9.33	430
82.06.08.2005	Marasipno	32.51	365
82.06.08.2006	Dorolamo Jaya	5.17	332
82.06.08.2007	Maratana Jaya	18.15	1,110
82.06.08.2008	Bebsili	4.08	291
82.06.08.2009	Yawanli	50.77	862
82.06.08.2010	Gaifoli	68.55	415
82.06.08.2011	Babasaram	4.56	761
82.06.08.2012	Tatangapu	4.75	342
82.06.08	District totals	651.18	6,878

The most northerly of the five is North Maba District (Kecamatan Maba Utara), which also lies entirely on the northeastern peninsula of Halmahera Island, and is composed of ten villages (desa), all sharing the postcode of 97864. They are listed with their areas and their populations as at mid 2024.

Kode Wilayah	Name of Village (desa)	Area in km^{2}	Pop'n Estimate mid 2024
82.06.09.2001	Sosolat	182.44	1,017
82.06.09.2002	Dorosago	124.94	1,084
82.06.09.2003	Patlean	27.54	1,325
82.06.09.2004	Lolasita	193.04	1,035
82.06.09.2005	Wasileo	126.21	1,515
82.06.09.2006	Pumlanga	76.45	828
82.06.09.2007	Jara Jara	40.30	1,106
82.06.09.2008	Doromoi	162.47	736
82.06.09.2009	Lili	151.26	573
82.06.09.2010	Patlean Jaya	33.83	506
82.06.09	District totals	1,118.47	9,725

== See also ==
- Buli Airport
