= East Halmahera Regency =

Regency in North Maluku, Indonesia

East Halmahera Regency Kabupaten Halmahera Timur
- Regency
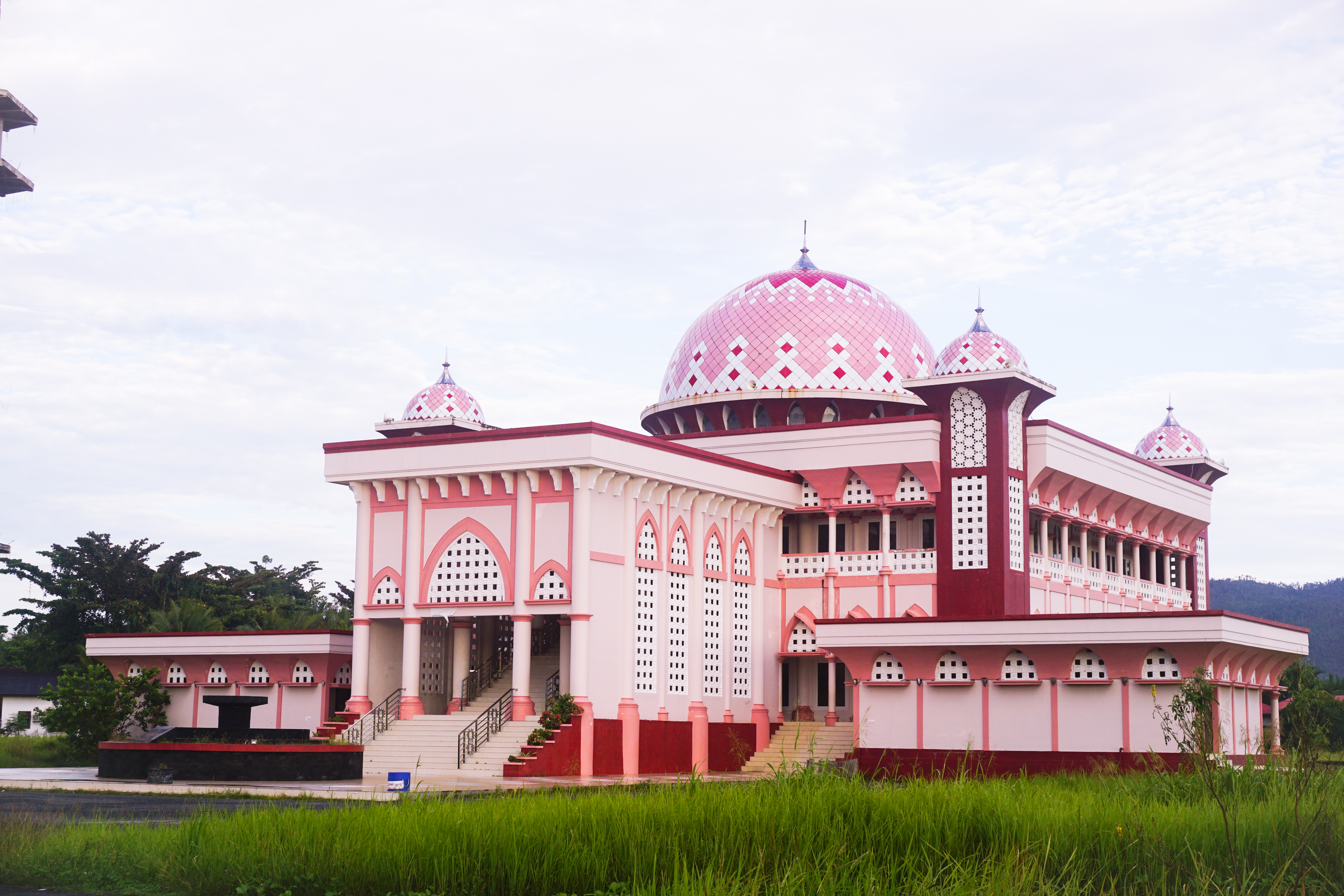
- Great mosque of Maba, capital of East Halmahera

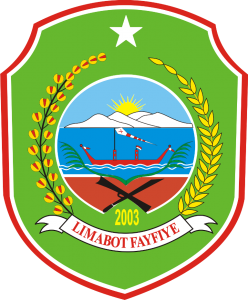
- Coat of arms
- Motto: Limabot Fayfiye

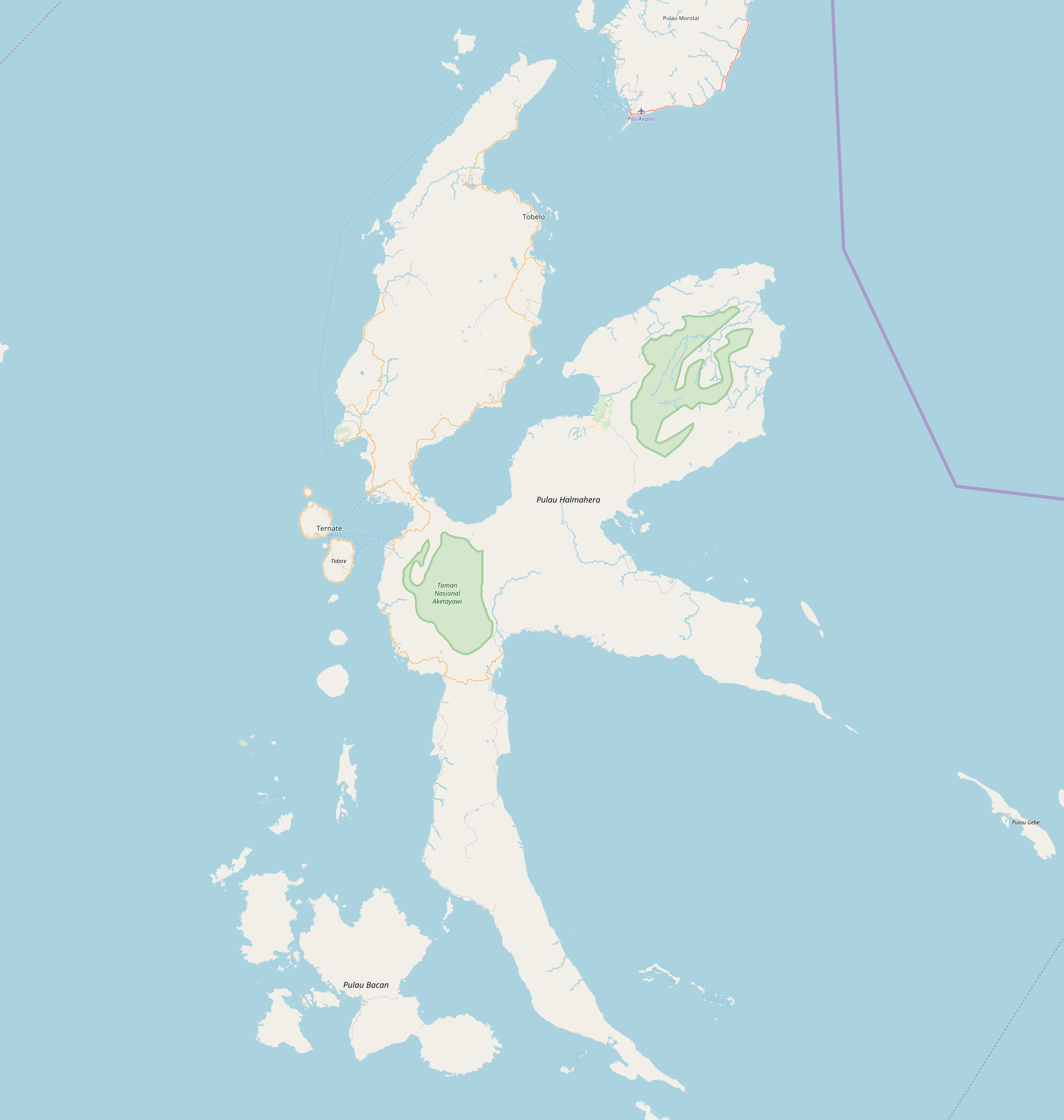
- Location in Maluku, Halmahera and Indonesia East Halmahera Regency (Halmahera) East Halmahera Regency (Indonesia)
- Coordinates: 1.3352°N 128.4863°E
- Country: Indonesia
- Province: North Maluku
- Capital: Maba

Government
  - Regent: Ubaid Yakub
  - Vice Regent: Anjas Taher

Area
  - Total: 6,515.74 km^{2} (2,515.74 sq mi)

Population (mid 2025 estimate)
  - Total: 101,389
  - Density: 15.5606/km^{2} (40.3018/sq mi)
- Time zone: UTC+9 (IEST)
- Area code: (+62) 921
- Website: haltimkab.go.id

East Halmahera Regency (Indonesian: Kabupaten Halmahera Timur) is a regency of North Maluku Province of Indonesia, and occupies the northeastern peninsula of Halmahera island, together with the northern half of the southeastern peninsula of that island. It was created on 25 February 2003 from part of Central Halmahera Regency, and covers a land area of 6,515.74 km^{2}. It had a population of 72,880 at the 2010 Census and 91,707 at the 2020 Census; the official estimate as of mid 2025 was 101,389 (comprising 52,385 males and 49,004 females). The capital lies at the town of Maba in Kota Maba District.

== Administration ==
The regency is divided into ten districts (kecamatan), tabulated below with their areas and their populations at the 2010 Census and the 2020 Census, together with the official estimate as at mid 2025. The table also includes the locations of the district administrative centres, the number of administrative villages (all rural desa) in each district, and its post code.

The five Maba Districts comprise the southeastern half of the regency (and of the northeastern peninsula, together with that portion of the southeastern peninsula within the regency); they cover a land area of 3,662.22 km^{2}, with 49,822 inhabitants in mid 2025. The five Wasile Districts comprise the northwestern half of the northeastern peninsula; together they cover 2,853.52 km^{2}, with 51,567 inhabitants in mid 2025. All the indigenous inhabitants speak North Halmahera languages, chiefly Tobelorese in the north (the Wasile districts) of the regency, and the related Togutil in the south (the Maba districts).

Kode Wilayah	Name of District (kecamatan)	English name	Area in km^{2}	Pop'n Census 2010	Pop'n Census 2020	Pop'n Estimate mid 2025	Admin centre	No. of villages	Post code
82.06.03	Maba Selatan	South Maba	503.77	6,105	8,216	8,491	Bicoli	9	97861
82.06.10	Kota Maba	Maba Town	952.91	7,508	9,233	11,143	Maba Sangaji	6	97862
82.06.02	Maba		434.89	9,767	12,560	13,585	Buli	10	97860
82.06.08	Maba Tengah	Central Maba	651.92	5,011	6,673	6,878	Wayamli	12	97863
82.06.09	Maba Utara	North Maba	1,118.73	7,113	8,588	9,725	Dorosago	10	97864
82.06.04	Wasile Selatan	South Wasile	1,078.41	10,999	13,269	15,379	Nusa Jaya	24	97866
82.06.01	Wasile		253.39	8,915	10,581	11,691	Cemara Jaya	7	97865
82.06.07	Wasile Timur	East Wasile	431.05	8,676	11,979	12,163	Dodaga	8	97868
82.06.05	Wasile Tengah	Central Wasile	490.16	4,768	5,958	6,603	Lolobata	8	97867
82.06.06	Wasile Utara	North Wasile	600.51	4,247	5,196	5,731	Labi-Labi	8	97869
	Totals		6,515.74	72,880	91,707	101,389	Maba	102	
