= Banggai =

Banggai may refer to various locations in Indonesia:-

- Banggai Regency, a regency of Central Sulawesi in Indonesia
- Banggai Islands Regency, a separate regency cut out of the Banggai Regency
- Banggai Laut Regency, a regency of Central Sulawesi in Indonesia
- Banggai Island, an island in Indonesia
- Kingdom of Banggai, a small former state in the regions above
- Banggai language
- Banggai people, an ethnic group
