= Ethnic groups in Indonesia =

Map showing ethnic groups native to Indonesia and Chinese Indonesians. Ethnic groups of foreign origin such as Arabs and Indians are not shown, but usually inhabit urban and coastal areas.

| Largest ethnic groups | Percentage |
| Javanese | 40.06% |
| Sundanese | 15.51% |
| Malay | 3.70% |
| Batak | 3.58% |
| Madurese | 3.03% |
| Betawi | 2.88% |
| Minangkabau | 2.73% |
| Bugis | 2.71% |
| Bantenese | 1.96% |
| Banjarese | 1.74% |
| Other ethnic groups | 22.10% |

There are more than 600 ethnic groups in the multiethnic Indonesian archipelago, making it one of the most diverse countries in the world. The vast majority of these belong the Austronesian peoples, whose ancestors migrated from Taiwan. They are primarily concentrated in western and central Indonesia. A significant minority are Melanesian peoples, descendants of some of the earliest modern humans to inhabit Southeast Asia, mostly found in eastern Indonesia. Some linguistic and genetic evidence suggests a pre-Austronesian population of Austroasiatic speakers in western Indonesia. Genetic studies show that ethnic groups in Java, Bali, and Lombok have significant traces of Austroasiatic ancestry, even though Austroasiatic languages have long been replaced by Austronesian languages in the region.

Based on ethnic classification, the largest ethnic group in Indonesia is the Javanese, who make up about 40% of the total population. The Javanese are concentrated on the island of Java, the world's most populous island, particularly in the central and eastern parts, but significant Javanese communities also exist throughout the archipelago due to historical migration and government-sponsored transmigration programs. It is also the largest ethnic group in Southeast Asia. The Sundanese are the next largest group; their homeland is located in the western part of the island of Java and the southern edge of Sumatra. The Malays, Batak, Madurese, Betawi, Minangkabau, and Bugis are the next largest groups in the country.

Many ethnic groups, particularly in Kalimantan and Papua, have only hundreds of members. Most of the local languages belong to the Austronesian language family, although a significant number of people, particularly in eastern Indonesia, speak unrelated Papuan languages. Indonesians of Chinese, Arab, European, African and Indian descent each make up less than 3% of the total Indonesian population.

== Statistics (2010) ==
The following lists of major ethnic groups in Indonesia are based on the 2010 Indonesian census.

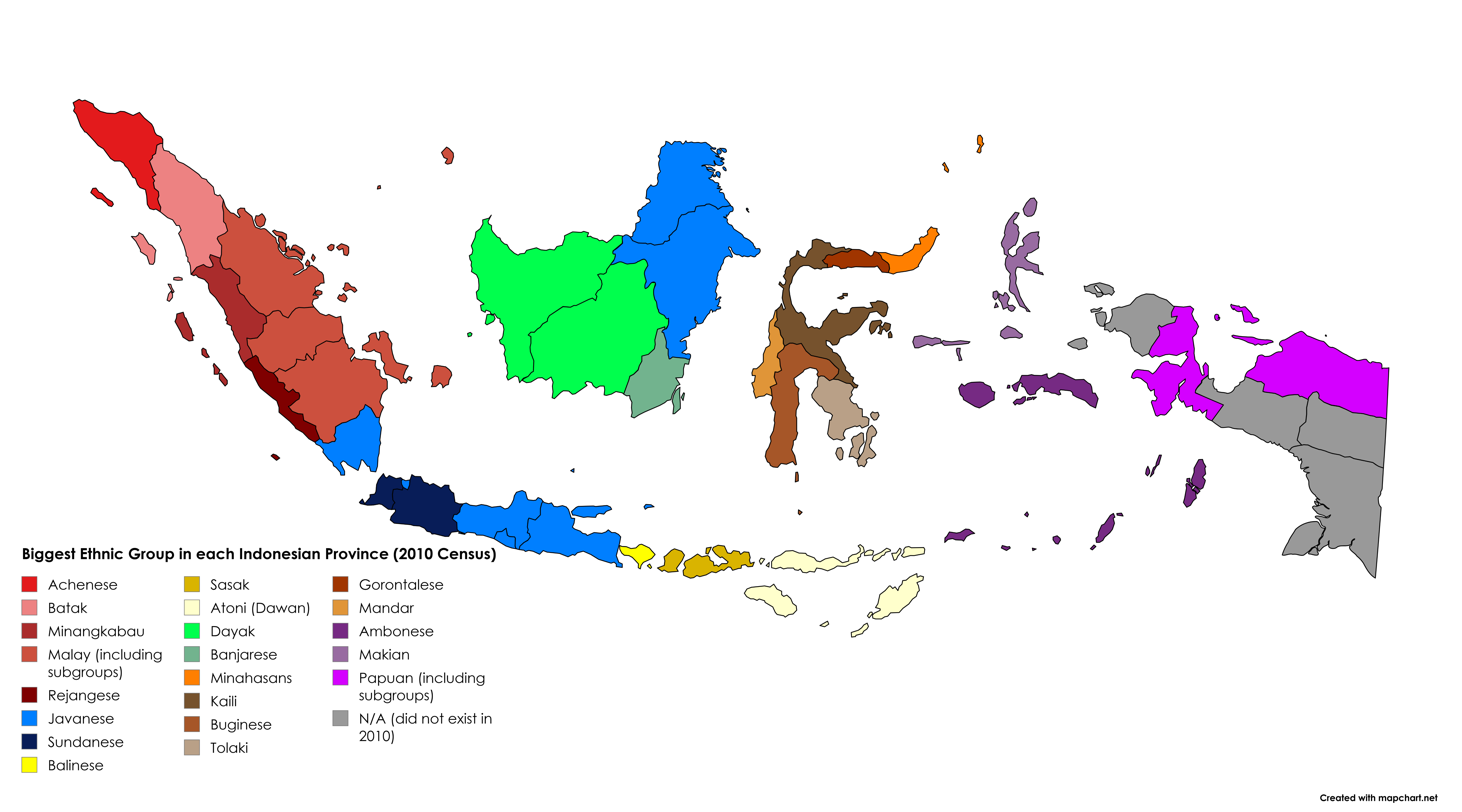
This map shows the biggest ethnic groups in the country of Indonesia from the 2010 census.

=== Initial classification ===
This list was compiled from the raw data of the 2010 census by Statistics Indonesia (Badan Pusat Statistik, BPS) based on a preliminary classification, which is not meant to be exhaustive and combined figures for smaller groups in various regions.

| Ethnic group | Population | |
| Ethnic group | Numbers | Percentage |
|---|---|---|
| Javanese | 95,217,022 | 40.22 |
| Sundanese | 36,701,670 | 15.5 |
| Batak | 8,466,969 | 3.58 |
| Ethnic groups from Sulawesi | 7,634,262 | 3.22 |
| Madurese | 7,179,356 | 3.03 |
| Betawi | 6,807,968 | 2.88 |
| Minangkabau | 6,462,713 | 2.73 |
| Bugis | 6,359,700 | 2.69 |
| Malay | 5,365,399 | 2.27 |
| Ethnic groups from South Sumatra | 5,119,581 | 2.16 |
| Bantenese | 4,657,784 | 1.97 |
| Ethnic groups from East Nusa Tenggara | 4,184,923 | 1.77 |
| Banjar | 4,127,124 | 1.74 |
| Ethnic groups from Aceh | 4,091,451 | 1.73 |
| Balinese | 3,946,416 | 1.67 |
| Sasak | 3,173,127 | 1.34 |
| Dayak | 3,009,494 | 1.27 |
| Chinese | 2,832,510 | 1.20 |
| Ethnic groups from Papua | 2,693,630 | 1.14 |
| Makassarese | 2,672,590 | 1.13 |
| Total | 236,728,379 | 100 |

=== New classification ===
This list was compiled from the same raw data of the 2010 census, according to the "new classification" developed by Institute of Southeast Asian Studies (ISEAS) in collaboration with Statistics Indonesia. The new classification categorized 1,331 coded ethnicities from the census into more than 600 groups instead of just 31 in the initial classification, completely dissolved the placeholder "ethnic groups from X" categories to better capture the diversity of Indonesia's ethnic demography, corrected misplaced groups and subgroups, and attempted to aggregate and separate sub-ethnic groups into ethnic groups by relying on anthropological sources.

List of ethnic groups with more than one million members based on the new classification
| Ethnic group | Population | | Main regions |
| Ethnic group | Millions | Percentage | Main regions |
|---|---|---|---|
| Javanese | 94.843 | 40.06% | Bengkulu, East Java, East Kalimantan, Central Java, Jambi, Lampung, North Sumatra, Riau, South Sumatra, Yogyakarta, North Coast of Banten, West Java |
| Sundanese | 36.704 | 15.51% | Banten, Jakarta, Lampung, West Java |
| Malay | 8.754 | 3.70% | Bangka-Belitung Islands, Bengkulu, Jambi, North Sumatra, Riau, Riau Islands, South Sumatra, West Kalimantan |
| Batak | 8.467 | 3.58% | Jakarta, North Sumatra, Riau, Riau Islands |
| Madurese | 7.179 | 3.03% | East Java |
| Betawi | 6.808 | 2.88% | Banten, Jakarta, West Java |
| Minangkabau | 6.463 | 2.73% | Jakarta, Jambi, North Sumatra, Riau, West Sumatra |
| Buginese | 6.415 | 2.71% | Central Sulawesi, East Kalimantan, North Kalimantan, South Sulawesi, Southeast Sulawesi, West Sulawesi |
| Bantenese | 4.642 | 1.96% | Banten |
| Banjar | 4.127 | 1.74% | South Kalimantan, Central Kalimantan, East Kalimantan |
| Balinese | 3.925 | 1.66% | Bali |
| Acehnese | 3.404 | 1.44% | Aceh |
| Dayak | 3.220 | 1.36% | Central Kalimantan, East Kalimantan, North Kalimantan, West Kalimantan |
| Sasak | 3.175 | 1.34% | West Nusa Tenggara |
| Chinese Indonesian | 2.833 | 1.20% | Bangka-Belitung Islands, North Sumatra, Jakarta, Riau, Riau Islands, West Kalimantan, North Coast of Central Java, East Java, Yogyakarta |
| Makassarese | 2.673 | 1.13% | South Sulawesi |
| Lampung | 1.376 | 0.58% | Lampung |
| Palembang | 1.252 | 0.53% | South Sumatra |
| Gorontalo | 1.252 | 0.53% | Gorontalo |
| Minahasan | 1.240 | 0.52% | North Sulawesi |
| Nias | 1.042 | 0.44% | North Sumatra |

Distribution of indigenous ethnic groups in Indonesia.

== Indigenous ethnic groups ==
The regions of Indonesia have some of their indigenous ethnic groups. Due to migration within Indonesia (as part of government transmigration programs or otherwise), there are significant populations of ethnic groups who reside outside of their traditional regions.

- Java: Javanese (Tenggerese, Osing, Banyumasan, Cirebonese, Kalang, etc.), Sundanese (Badui, Bantenese), Betawi, Tugu, Malays, Orang Pulo, Kangean, and Madurese (Bawean, Pendalungan)
- Madura: Madurese (Bawean), Kangean, and others
- Sumatra: Acehnese, Gayo, Alas, Singkil, Haloban, Batak, Malay, Minangkabau (Pesisir, Mukomuko, Aneuk Jamee), Rejang, Palembang, Lampung, Nias, Mentawai, Enggano, Kubu, Musi, Ogan, Komering, Rawas, Bangka, Belitung, and others
- Kalimantan: Dayak, Banjarese, Malays, Kutai, Paser, and others
- Sulawesi: Makassarese, Buginese, Selayar, Mandarese, Minahasan, Torajan, Gorontalo (Polahi), Bajau, Butonese, Tolaki, Kaili, Lore (Bada, Behoa, Napu, Sedoa), Rampi, Pamona, Kulawi, Balantak, Banggai (Seasea), Saluan, Buol, Tomini, Mongondow, Sangir, and others
- Lesser Sunda Islands: Balinese, Bali Mula, Loloan Malays, Sasak, Sumbawa, Bimanese, Komodo, Manggarai, Riung, Rongga, Ngada, Nage, Keo, Ende, Lio, Lamaholot, Atoni, Tetun, Helong, Rotenese, Savu, Sikka, Sumba, Abui, Alorese, and others
- Moluccas: Ambonese, Alune, Buru, Kei, Manusela, Nuaulu, Gorom, Manipa, Tanimbarese, Saparua, Wemale, Aru, Kisar, Babar, Wetar, Tobelo, Galela, Gorap, Sahu, Tabaru, Ternate, Tidore, Makian, Sula, Taliabu, and others
- Papua: Asmat, Amungme, Bauzi, Dani, Lani, Sawi, Yaur, Biak, Sentani, Mimika, Yali, Arfak, Auye, Dauwa, Ketengban, Mek, Moni, Yapen, Ngalum, Waropen, Maybrat, Mbaham-Matta, Moi, and others (see List of ethnic groups of West Papua, Southwest Papua)

== Non-indigenous ethnicities ==
Throughout Indonesian history, various ethnic groups of foreign origin spread throughout Indonesia in several migration waves, and usually established themselves in urban centres, seldom settling rural parts of the country.

- Africans: Afro-Indonesians are Indonesians who have full or half sub-Saharan African ancestry. The history of their arrival varies, from the Dutch colonial era they were known as Black Dutch mercenaries from the Gold Coast. Some of these African Mercenaries opted to settle in the colony instead of returning, creating a unique population of Indonesians of African descent, the town of Purworejo, was once a home to a large population of its descendants. Most of their remaining descendants who opted to become Indonesian citizens instead currently can be found in Java, but are no longer visible, and have been largely assimilated. Modern African descendants in the country includes mostly descendants of expatriates from various African countries who had either married local Indonesians or had obtained Indonesian citizenship, they can be found in major cities across Indonesia.
- Arabs: The Arabs have settled and lived in Indonesia for a long time and have played a major role on the spread of Islam in Indonesia, The Arabs have also contributed to founding several major Sultanates in the region; a large number of them however, have fully assimilated within the greater Indonesian society. With one source estimating anywhere between 4 and 5 million of ethnic Arabs and those who are of mixed Arab ethnicity living in the country; They are mostly concentrated around Pasar Kliwon in Surakarta, also at Jakarta, Ampel in Surabaya, Malang, Tegal, Probolinggo, Pekalongan, and various other coastal cities and towns in Java, Sumatra and Kalimantan.
- Chinese: The most significant ethnic minority of foreign origin in Indonesia, officially amounting to around 2.8 million. Chinese people began migrating to Indonesia in the 12th century, with significant waves in the 16th and 18th centuries. They are mostly concentrated within chinatowns, also known as "Pecinan" in Indonesian, Pecinans can be found on almost every urban centers in Indonesia, the most notable however are located in Bogor, Jakarta, Malang, Semarang, Surakarta, Surabaya, Tangerang, Yogyakarta, North Sumatra, Riau, Riau Islands, Bangka-Belitung Islands, and West Kalimantan. The relationship between the ethnic Chinese and the Natives have been largely peaceful. Albeit more complex in comparison to the Arabs and the Indians. Few cities in Indonesia have also preserved their heritage links to China, the most notable being Singkawang. They are spread throughout the Indonesian archipelago and found on almost every urban centers in Indonesia.
- Germans: During the Company rule of the Dutch East India Company (VOC) thousands of Germans came to Indonesia making them one of the most significant European population in the colony, after the Dutch and the Portuguese, both as administrative employees under the Dutch Colony, as well as engineers, researchers, technical scientists and German soldiers. A notable group is the Württemberg Regiment. The Württemberg Regiment, also known as the Contract Army, was a regiment of Germans from Württemberg who were contracted into the Royal Netherlands East Indies Army in 1790–1808. German industry has been present in Indonesia since the 19th century. After 1945, German entrepreneurs, German experts in development cooperation as well as in education and research, and intensive academic exchanges continued the good relations between Germany and Indonesia.
- Indians: Indians (mostly Tamils and to a lesser extent, Sindhis and Punjabis) have also settled the Indonesian archipelago for a long time, they played a huge role on the spread of Hinduism and Buddhism within the region, and has been a major influence on the Indonesian culture as a whole, just like the Arabs however, a significant portion of the community have fully assimilated within the greater Indonesian society; They are mostly concentrated in urban centres, with significant numbers around Pasar Baru in Jakarta, and the most well known at Kampung Madras in Medan. Almost 95% of all Indian Indonesians are living within the province of North Sumatra.
- Indos: Indos or Eurasians are people of mixed native Indonesian and Dutch/European ancestry. They emerged in the Dutch East Indies colonial era. Today, less than one million Indonesians with varying degrees of mixed ancestry can trace their ancestors to Europeans (mostly Dutch and Portuguese). Nowadays, Indos are mostly found within the Greater Jakarta metropolitan area, particularly within the Puncak area, and other urban centers of the country such as Bandung, Medan, Surabaya and Semarang. Many of them also held dual citizenship. As of 2011, an estimated 124,000 Indos live outside the Netherlands (including Indonesia).
- Japanese: Japanese migration to Indonesia has been recorded since the colonial days of the country, the first Japanese who arrived in the country were largely Japanese Eurasian children who were banished to the colony following the enactment of the Sakoku edict. Their numbers would steadily grew in the following centuries. Other Japanese ethnic groups, such as the Okinawans would also migrate and settle in parts of the North Sulawesi province, beginning in the late 1920s. However, in the years following the end of World War II, the percentage of Japanese people had decreased as they had migrated back to Japan, with only a small numbers of Japanese (mostly ex-soldiers) opting to remain in Indonesia and becoming Indonesian citizens. The recent increase of Japanese residents in Indonesia has been driven by the increase of Japanese business and investment in the country since the 1990s, with majority of those residents being expatriates who retain their Japanese citizenship. They live mostly in Jakarta and Bali.
- Mardijkers: Their name means "freeman" and derives from the Dutch pronunciation of the Malay word "merdeka", which means "free". The ancestors of the Mardijkers were captured as slaves from Portuguese controlled territories in India, Malacca, and Africa by the Dutch East India Company with varying ethnic origins, Including Europeans and various Portuguese speaking Natives, and were freed right after being settled here. Over long periods of time, they have gradually returned to their respective home countries. However, significant populace still exist in the capital region as of this day and retains its own distinct culture characteristic of the Mardijker people, which is heavily influenced by Portuguese culture.
- Peranakans: The Peranakans are a people of mixed native-Indonesian and Chinese ancestry. Particularly, descendants of the first wave of Southern Chinese settlers who had arrived in the Indonesian Archipelago during the 14th-17th century. A lot of these Chinese settlers were single men who intermarried with the local population, creating an ethnic group who are now known as Peranakans, nowadays the Peranakans can be found across the Indonesian archipelago, particularly in Java, Sumatra and Kalimantan.

== Migrants ==
According to the United Nations, there were 355,505 international migrants in Indonesia in 2020. Their most common countries of origin were as follows:

International migrants in Indonesia in 2020
| China | 76,028 |
| South Korea | 33,580 |
| United Kingdom | 32,911 |
| Singapore | 23,681 |
| Germany | 19,879 |
| United States | 12,697 |
| India | 12,590 |
| Australia | 11,400 |
| Pakistan | 8,645 |
| Netherlands | 7,306 |
| Philippines | 4,230 |
Source: "International Migrant Stock 2020: Destination and origin". United Nations. 2020.

== See also ==
- Demographics of Indonesia
- Proto-Malay
- List of ethnic groups of West Papua
