= Balantak, Sulawesi =

Coordinates: 0.814167°S 123.370278°E

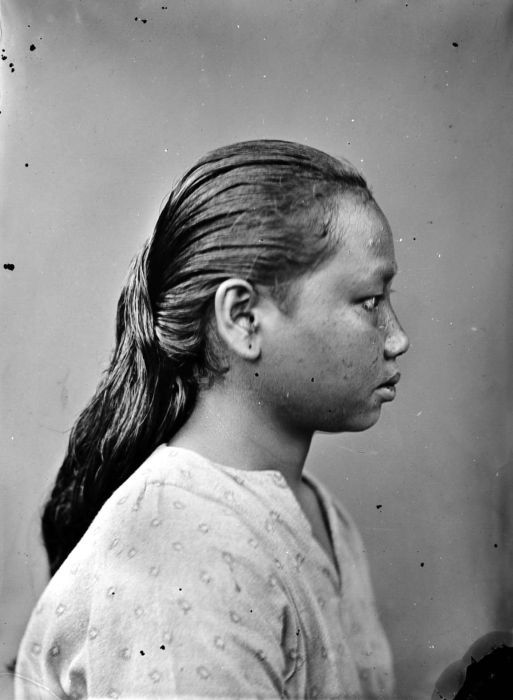
A Balantak woman (1913)

Balantak is an administrative district (kecamatan) in the Banggai Regency, in the Central Sulawesi Province of Indonesia. It is bordered to the east by the Maluku Sea, while its land borders are with the districts of South Balantak, Lamala, Masama, Bualemo and North Balantak, all occupying the peninsula at the eastern end of the Banggai Regency.

The Balantak people, who speak the Balantak language, are the leading indigenous ethnic group throughout the eastern end of the peninsula (in the western half of the regency, the most numerous people are the Saluan). As of 1982, there were an estimate 30,000 Balantak, spread over several districts in the eastern part of the regency (the population of Balantak District itself was only 5,966 at the 2020 Census). Traditionally they lived in rectangular houses on stilts over swidden fields. They raised fowl, goats, rice, yams, taro, and millet. The district was described in 1682 as being part of the Banggai Kingdom. Administration was via local chiefs and the Ternate Sultanate. Ancestor worship has been a feature of their traditional religion and Christianity and Islam have been influential since the turn of the 20th century.
