= Luwuk =

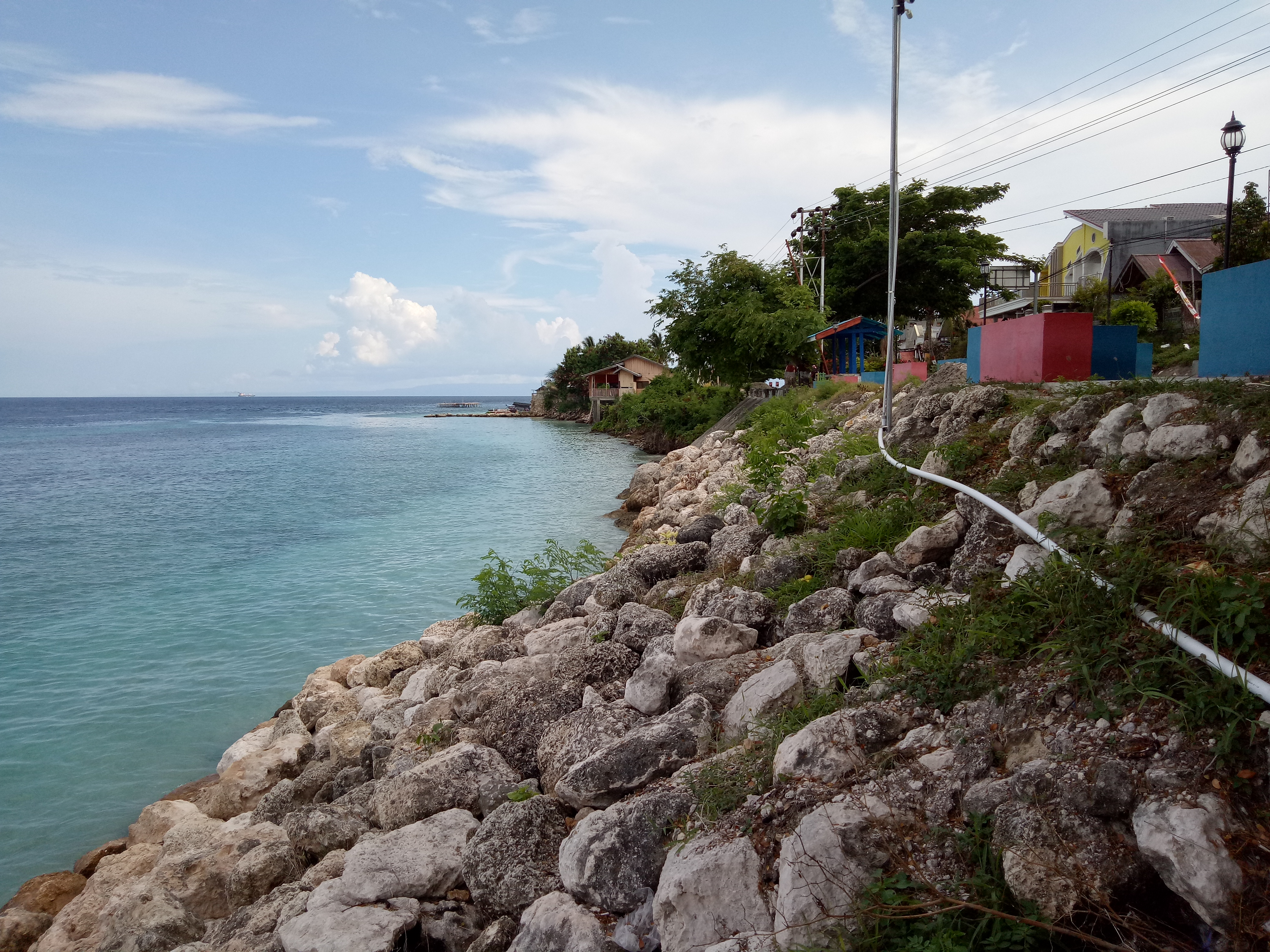
- Kilo 5 Beach

- Location within Sulawesi
- Coordinates: 0°55′48.32″S 122°47′45.96″E
- Country: Indonesia
- Province: Central Sulawesi
- Regency: Banggai Regency

Area
  - Total: 72.82 km^{2} (28.12 sq mi)

Luwuk is the capital of Banggai Regency, Central Sulawesi, Indonesia. Its area is 72.82 km^{2} following boundary changes in 2012 and 2015. There used to be an oil industry in the region. At the 2020 census the town had a population of 34,849.

The universities in Luwuk are UNTIKA and UNISMUH. Syukuran Aminuddin Amir Airport serves the area.

Luwuk has 3 indigenous ethnic groups - Saluan, Balantak, and Banggai.

== Climate ==
Luwuk has a tropical savanna climate (Aw) with little to moderate rainfall year-round. It is one of the driest places in Indonesia.

Climate data for Luwuk (Syukuran Aminuddin Amir Airport) (1991–2020 normals)
Month	Jan	Feb	Mar	Apr	May	Jun	Jul	Aug	Sep	Oct	Nov	Dec	Year
Mean daily maximum °C (°F)	31.9 (89.4)	31.9 (89.4)	31.6 (88.9)	31.1 (88.0)	30.6 (87.1)	29.8 (85.6)	29.2 (84.6)	29.4 (84.9)	30.1 (86.2)	31.1 (88.0)	31.8 (89.2)	31.9 (89.4)	30.9 (87.6)
Daily mean °C (°F)	28.5 (83.3)	28.5 (83.3)	28.2 (82.8)	27.9 (82.2)	27.6 (81.7)	26.9 (80.4)	26.2 (79.2)	26.2 (79.2)	27.2 (81.0)	28.1 (82.6)	28.5 (83.3)	28.5 (83.3)	27.7 (81.9)
Mean daily minimum °C (°F)	25.1 (77.2)	25.3 (77.5)	24.9 (76.8)	24.7 (76.5)	24.6 (76.3)	24.3 (75.7)	23.8 (74.8)	23.7 (74.7)	24.0 (75.2)	24.7 (76.5)	25.1 (77.2)	25.2 (77.4)	24.6 (76.3)
Average precipitation mm (inches)	107.5 (4.23)	113.1 (4.45)	140.9 (5.55)	149.3 (5.88)	137.3 (5.41)	172.4 (6.79)	194.3 (7.65)	111.9 (4.41)	46.9 (1.85)	37.8 (1.49)	66.1 (2.60)	125.4 (4.94)	1,402.9 (55.25)
Average precipitation days	10.7	9.0	13.3	15.3	12.4	14.2	17.8	13.3	6.1	4.6	6.8	11.3	134.8
Mean monthly sunshine hours	176.1	171.1	162.4	167.1	179.6	134.3	121.9	151.0	205.4	235.7	220.9	179.4	2,104.9
Source: Starlings Roost Weather
