= Islam in Central Sulawesi =

Religion in province of Indonesia

Central Sulawesi in Indonesia

Islam in Central Sulawesi, a province of Indonesia, is the majority religion embraced by around 75% of the province's 2,683,722 inhabitants (2011 projection figure, based on the 2010 census). The propagators of Islam were thought to enter Central Sulawesi through neighboring regions, namely Bone, Wajo, and Mandar from the south and west routes, and through Gorontalo and Ternate from the north and east routes via Tomini Bay and Tolo Bay.

== History ==
The Islamic teachings were thought to have first spread to the region of Central Sulawesi in Buol dan Banggai, where both regions accepted Islam in the mid-16th century due to influences from Ternate. A king of Buol was noted to have an Islamic name, namely Eato Muhammad Tahir who ruled between 1540-1595.

At the beginning of the 17th century, Islam began to spread in the land of the Kailis propagated by Dato Karama (his real name Abdullah Raqie), who was believed to have come from Minangkabau. Dato Karama preached in the Palu area and its surroundings, and because of him the Kaili king named Pue Njidi converted to Islam. In the Parigi and surrounding areas, another Minangkabau preacher named Dato Mangaji (also called by the local title Tori Agama) was able to invite the Parigi king named Tori Kota and his son Magau Janggo to convert to Islam.

== Demographics ==
=== Geographic distribution ===
The following is the distribution of Muslims per city/regency in province of Central Sulawesi in 2010.

City/Regency	Muslim pop.	%
Banggai	246,492	76.17%
Banggai Islands	120,006	69.92%
Banggai Laut	no data	
Morowali	149,955	72.68%
North Morowali	no data	
Poso	77,158	36.88%
Donggala	246,960	88.96%
Tolitoli	195,239	92.40%
Buol	124,686	94.02%
Parigi Moutong	333,533	80.64%
Tojo Una-Una	125,194	90.85%
Sigi	140,610	65.39%
Palu City	288,126	85.62%
Totals	2,047,959	77.72%

== Education ==
There is an Islamic institute of higher education established in Central Sulawesi, the STAIN Datokarama Palu.
