= Seasea people =

Seasea
Pau Seasea

Total population
- 1.655

Regions with significant populations
- Indonesia (Central Sulawesi)

Languages
- Banggai (Seasea dialect), Indonesian

Religion
- Protestantism (majority), Islam

Related ethnic groups
- Banggai

The Seasea People (Banggai: Pau Seasea) is an ethnic group that lives in the inland highlands and mountainous areas of Peleng Island in the Banggai Islands Regency of Indonesia. They are a sub-ethnic group of the Banggai people, the dominant ethnic group in the Banggai Islands and Banggai Sea.

== History ==
The Seasea people are native to Peleng Island, with most of their territory, they called it Lipu Tanga Sesea, located in the mountainous or central areas of Peleng Island in Banggai Islands Regency. The customary territory of this tribe has been designated by the Regent of Banggai Islands.

According to Seasea traditional leaders, their territory in the mountains is separated from the coastal areas. This occurred because, in ancient times, there was an agreement between the people living in the mountainous region and those living in the coastal region. This agreement is evidenced by a place called Labotan Toutobunan, the grave of a child who was split in two and buried in two different locations.

Furthermore, taro is regarded as a staple food in Seasea folklore. It is also believed that taro is a spiritual plant. According to the myth they hold, the taro plant was created at the same time as the first human in the Seasea customary territory. Their ancestors later moved this taro to their fields, where it became the main crop of the Seasea people. Therefore, for this community, taro is considered a sacred plant.

In addition, according to Tonggol (the traditional leader), about the legend of the first human of the Seasea people, the first person to inhabit the area was named Boloki Seasea. According to the beliefs of the indigenous community in Lipu Tanga Sesea, Boloki Seasea was a woman who could transform into a cat. Because of this, she was given the title Tomundo Sasa, where tomundo means “king” and sasa means “cat.” Boloki Seasea later had three children. She subsequently became the ancestor of the Seasea people. Therefore, the community in Lipu Tanga Sesea is also known as Pau Seasea, which means “descendants of Seasea".

Furthermore, Boloki Seasea does not have a burial site in Lipu Tanga Sesea. This is because Boloki Seasea is believed to have once disappeared on a mountain peak located to the north of the Lipu Tanga Sesea customary territory. For this reason, the people of Lipu Tanga Sesea believe that her grave cannot be found in their region. It is said that “Boloki Seasea did not die like an ordinary human, but instead disappeared".

In addition, some accounts mention that in the early Anno Domini years, there was one of the eight kings of the Banggai Kingdom named Tomunda Sasa, also known by the nickname Mbumbu Patola. The nickname comes from two words: mbumbu, meaning “king,” and patola, meaning “cat.” This suggests that the legend of Boloki Seasea bears historical similarities to the ancient Banggai Kingdom.

According to the Seasea community, the term lipu refers to the smallest administrative unit at the present-day village level. The term lipu itself is inherited from the former Banggai Kingdom. Each lipu is led by a traditional official called a tonggol. The tonggol is recognized as the community leader within the customary structure and is still acknowledged by the Seasea people today. As an important part of the Banggai Kingdom in the past, the tonggol was also part of the royal administrative apparatus at the lowest level, equivalent to a village head.

Furthermore, they believe that Tinassu was their first village, which over time developed into four settlements: Tinassu, Butabonggong, Batani, and Tombila. However, during the Dutch East Indies era, they were gradually relocated to the settlements where they live today. Until now, they still adhere to Christianity, a monotheistic religion introduced by Dutch missionaries.

Meanwhile, during the period of Dutch colonial rule, social order was implemented through colonial policies. As a result, the residents of Tinassu were relocated to Kambung Lapetak. The residents of Tombilak were relocated to Kambung Teteek, the residents of Batani were relocated to Kambung Lelak, and the residents of Butabonggong were relocated to Kambung Tallak.

After the independence period, around the 1960s, the customary territory of Lipu Tanga Sesea was under the authority of Bulagi District. Nowadays, the Seasea people settlements in Lipu Tanga Sesea are Osan, Lemalu, Momotan, Tatarandang, Alani, and Palabatu / Palabatu II.

Currently, Seasea relies on plantation, livestock, and forestry products for its livelihood. Their gardens are planted with sweet potatoes, taro, and coconut. Their main economic commodities include tubers, coconut, cloves, nutmeg, and candlenuts. Meanwhile, livestock farming includes cattle and pigs, and forest products harvested include honey. However, Peleng Island's karst and limestone terrain are not suitable for growing rice. Therefore, food staples such as rice, flour, and other household necessities are imported from the mainland of Sulawesi.

== Population and distribution ==
The Seasea has a population of 1,655 people, consisting of 842 men and 813 women in 445 families. They live in six villages located in the inland highlands, which are Osan, Lemelu, Momotan, Tatarandang, Alani, and Palabatu II.

Today, many Seasea people have moved down and now live in the valley and lowland areas together with the Banggai. For example, in villages, they live side by side with migrants. Many of them have even left Peleng Island.

== Lifestyle ==
In the mountainous areas of Peleng Island, the Seasea live by practicing agriculture. They consume tubers, especially Banggai yam, a local yam known for its very large size. They also obtain their daily necessities at a weekly barter market.

== Language ==
Like most Banggai people, they speak the Banggai language of Seasea dialect. However, their mother tongue is threatened with extinction, and many children can no longer speak the language and have shifted to using Indonesian.

== Culture ==
=== Musical instruments ===
The Seasea community has a traditional musical instrument similar to a gong, called the batong. The batong is usually used to accompany traditional Seasea dances, such as the baya dance, the balatidak dance, and others. In addition, there is also tilalu, an instrument that resembles a flute. There are also several other traditional Seasea musical instruments that are not durable, meaning they cannot be used again after being used for a certain period of time.

=== Traditional dances ===
Several traditional Seasea dances can be seen on YouTube. These dances are usually performed at important local events, such as the welcoming of a governor and other officials. Many local television stations also come to record these performances.

=== Oral literature ===
Seasea has several forms of oral literary tradition, usually in the form of poetry that is sung as songs, such as baode and poupe. Baode consists of lyrics recounting the history and origins of the Seasea people, while poupe consists of lyrics sung to express meanings such as gratitude or prayer.

== Bibliographies ==
- Pasaribu, Norman E. (2018). Tak Ada Yang Akan Hilang di Banggai. 1. Jakarta: Badan Pengembangan dan Pembinaan Bahasa, Ministry of Education and Culture. pp. 1–90. ISBN 978-602-437-546-1.
