= Labobo =

District of Central Sulawesi, Indonesia

- District
- Location Labobo (Indonesia)
- Coordinates: 1°41′8.2766″S 123°23′1.3312″E
- Country: Indonesia
- Province: Central Sulawesi
- Regency: Banggai Sea
- District seat: Mansalean

Area
  - Total: 85.65 km^{2} (33.07 sq mi)

Population (2020)
  - Total: 6,036
  - Density: 70.47/km^{2} (182.5/sq mi)
- Time zone: UTC+8 (ICT)
- Regional code: 72.11.05
- Villages: 8

Labobo is a district in Banggai Sea Regency, Central Sulawesi, Indonesia. As of 2020, it was inhabited by 6,036 people, and has the total area of 85.65 km^{2}.

== Geography ==
Labobo District has an area of approximately 85.65 km². This area is dominated by the coast and small islands, with all villages/sub-districts located on the coast. The topography of this area is mostly coastal lowlands with several hills in the central part of the islands.

Labobo District is divided into 8 villages (desa), namely:

- Lalong
- Lipulalongo
- Paisulamo
- Alasan
- Mansalean
- Bontosi
- Lipu Talas
- Padingkian
