= Saluan–Banggai languages =

Subgroup of the Austronesian language family

Saluan–Banggai
- Saluan–Banggai
- Geographic distribution: Indonesia (Sulawesi)
- Linguistic classification: Austronesian: Malayo-Polynesian; Celebic; Saluan–Banggai
- Subdivisions: Saluanic; Eastern

Language codes
- Glottolog: salu1251

The Saluan–Banggai languages are a group of closely related languages spoken in eastern Central Sulawesi province, Indonesia. They belong to the Celebic subgroup of the Austronesian family.

== Languages ==
- Eastern: Banggai, Balantak
- Saluanic: Andio, Bobongko, Saluan, Batui
