= Peleng =

Island in Indonesia

- Location within Sulawesi

Geography
- Location: South East Asia
- Coordinates: 1°24′S 123°10′E
- Area: 2,488.79 km^{2} (960.93 sq mi)
- Highest elevation: 1,100 m (3600 ft)
- Highest point: Unnamed

Administration
- Indonesia
- Province: Central Sulawesi

Demographics
- Population: 131,682 (mid 2021 estimate)
- Pop. density: 52.91/km^{2} (137.04/sq mi)
- Ethnic groups: Banggai, Seasea, Sama-Bajau, and others

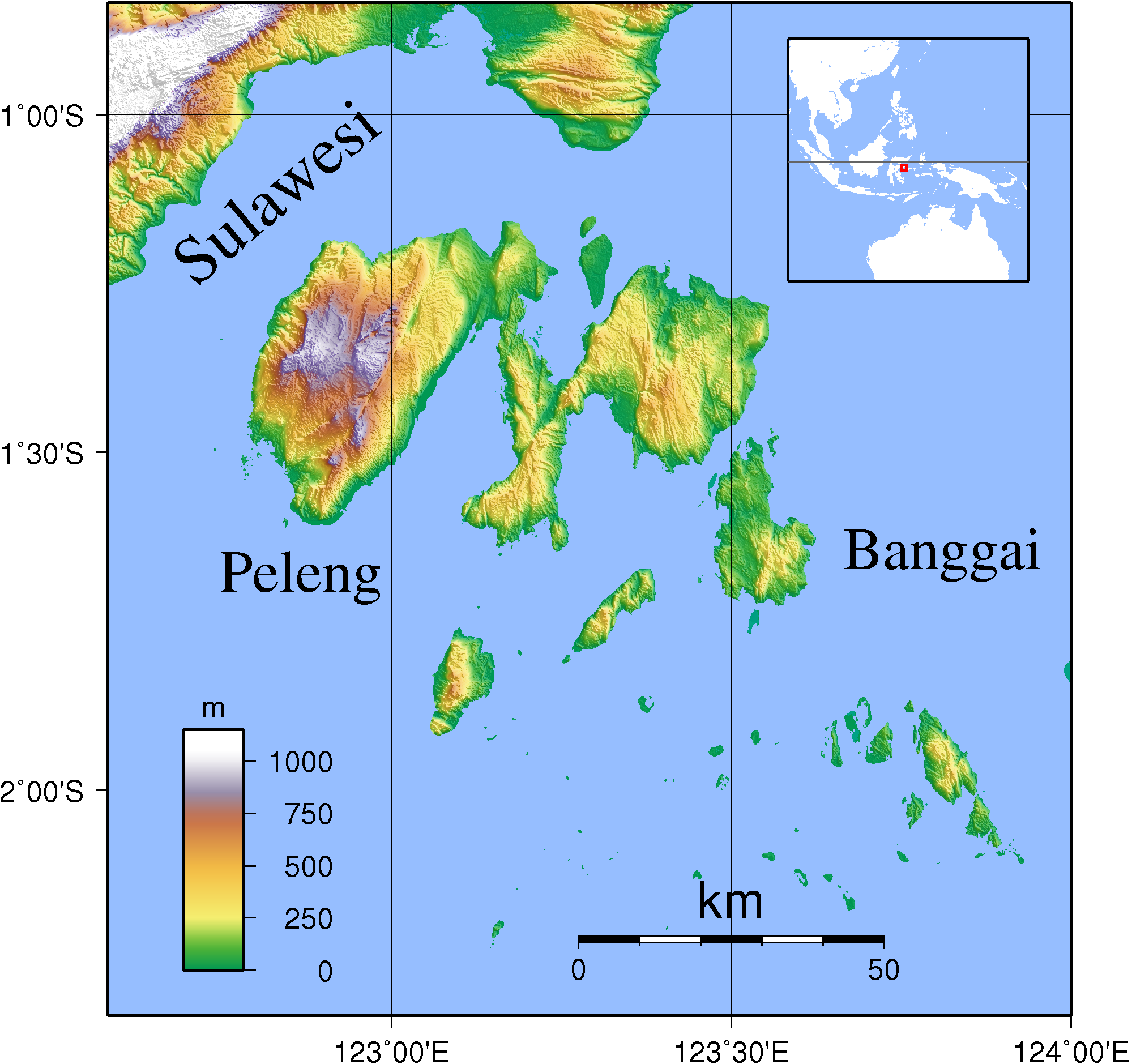
Peleng, off the East Peninsula of Sulawesi

Peleng is an island off the east coast of Sulawesi, Indonesia and is the largest island of the Banggai Islands (Kepulauan Banggai). It is surrounded by the Banda Sea and Molucca Sea and has an area of 2,488.79 km^{2} (including offshore islands within the regency).

Following the splitting off of the southern Banggai Islands to form a separate Banggai Laut Regency, Peleng Island now effectively forms all of the Banggai Islands Regency (within Central Sulawesi Province), which also includes some 440 small islands around the coast of Peleng, of which the largest are Bangkalan and Bakamanpauno Islands off the north coast of Peleng. Some of the smaller islands to the south of Peleng which were formerly part of the Banggai Islands Regency were removed in 2013 to form a separate Banggai Laut Regency; these comprise Banggai Island itself, the Bowokan Islands, Labobo, Kebongan, Kotudan, Tropettenando, Timpau, Salue Besar, Salue Kecil, Masepe, and Bangkulu.

== Fauna ==
In January 2020 an article published in the journal Science documented the discovery of two new bird species and one subspecies that were found in the mountains of Peleng. These are the species Peleng fantail (Rhipidura habibiei), a subspecies of the mountain tailorbird (Phyllergates cucullatus relictus) and a subspecies of the island leaf warbler (Phylloscopus poliocephalus suaramerdu).

== Inhabitation ==
The majority of people on this Peleng Island make their living planting coconuts, sweet potatoes, or fishing.

The island is divided into 12 districts (kecamatan), each with the district capitals on the island. The island's largest towns are Basiano and Bonganang.

=== List of towns ===
- Basiano
- Batulombo
- Bongangang
- Bulagi
- Kalumbatan
- Liang
- Lolantang
- Lukpenenteng
- Luksagu
- Lumbi-Lumbi
- Pelei
- Mamsamat
- Mumulusan
- Patukubi
- Salakan
- Sambiut
- Sambulangan
- Tabata

== See also ==
- Peleng tarsier
