= Bungku language =

Austronesian language spoken in Sulawesi, Indonesia

Bungku
- Native to: Indonesia
- Region: Sulawesi
- Native speakers: (27,000 cited 2000 census)
- Language family: Austronesian: Malayo-Polynesian; Celebic; Bungku–Tolaki; Bungku

Language codes
- ISO 639-3: bkz
- Glottolog: bung1269

Bungku is an Austronesian language (one of the Celebic languages) spoken by the Bungku people of Southeast Sulawesi, Indonesia. It is quite close to Wawonii. It was a local lingua franca before independence.
