= Kingdom of Banggai =

Historical kingdom in Indonesia

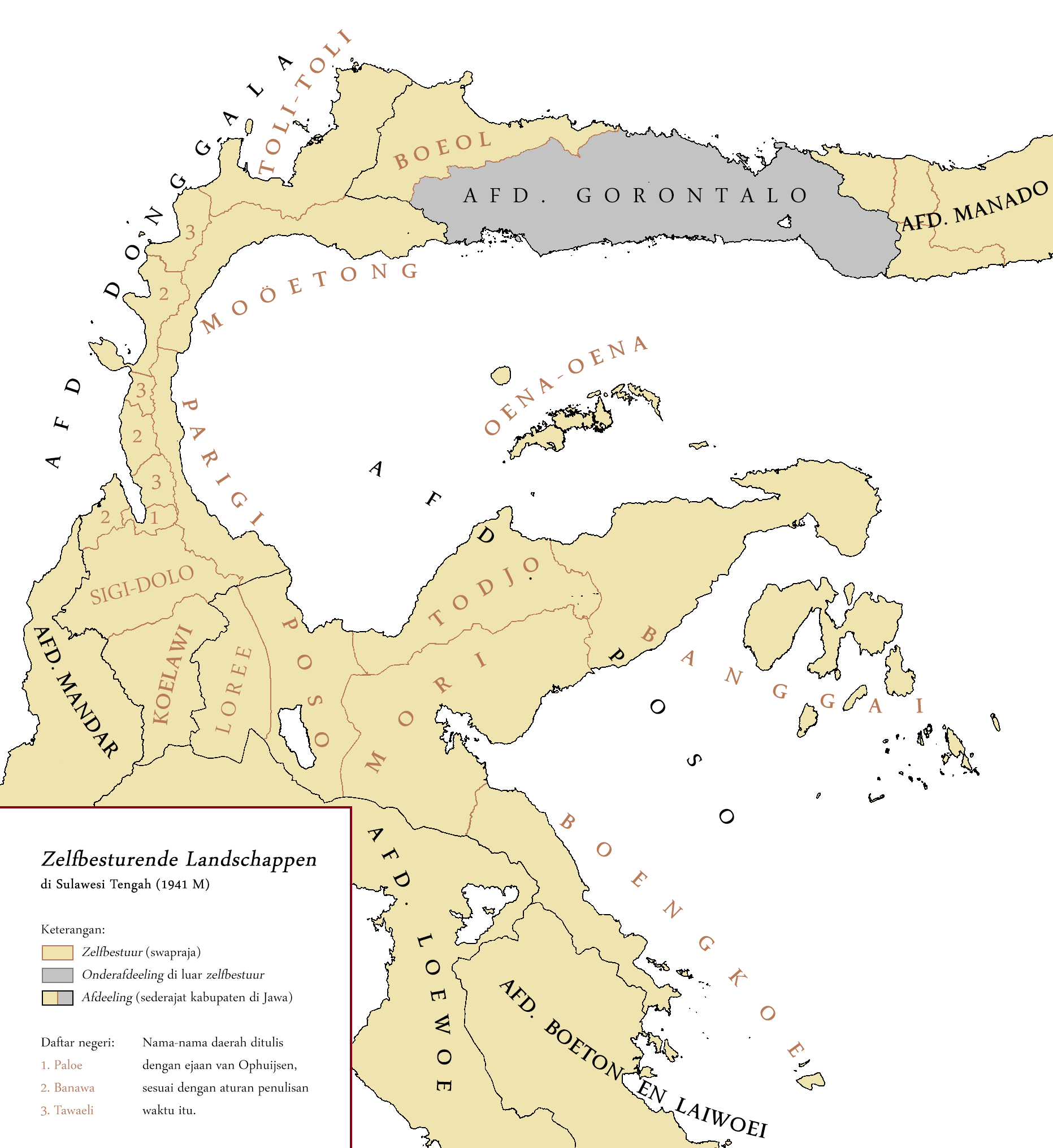
- Native states of Central Sulawesi under the administration of Dutch East Indies in 1941, including Banggai.
- Status: Tributary state of the Sultanate of Ternate
- Government: Monarchy
- Raja
| Succeeded by |
| Dutch East Indies |
- Today part of: Indonesia

The Kingdom of Banggai (Jawi: کرجاءن بڠݢاي; romanized: Kerajaan Banggai) was a petty kingdom in present-day Central Sulawesi, Indonesia. It was based around the Banggai Islands and the eastern coast of Sulawesi, centered at the island of Banggai. For a significant part of its history, the kingdom was under the overlordship of the Sultanate of Ternate. Its rulers held the title of Raja (راج).

== History ==
=== Ternate ===
The island of Banggai was named in a Chinese document dating from 1304 and the 14th century Negarakertagama as a Majapahit tributary. In the 16th century, four small states located in Banggai were conquered by the Sultanate of Ternate under Sultan Babullah, with Java-born Ternatean general Adi Cokro expanding the polity in the 1580s to include parts of mainland Sulawesi. Adi Cokro's son Mandapar was recorded to rule between 1600 and 1625. It was recorded that the king of Banggai sent his son to Ternate in 1564 to examine Christianity and Islam, eventually selecting the former.

Between 1536 and 1539, Portuguese administrator António Galvão recorded contemporary oral tales of the kings of Banggai, along with Bacan, Papua, and Butung, being descended from hatchlings of four serpent eggs found by an elder in Bacan. The myth associated the states with the Maluku Islands – centered around Ternate and Tidore – placing them in the peripheries. A Dutch report from 1682 noted the Banggai Kingdom as having control over the relatively large islands of Banggai and Peleng, "a hundred" little islands – mostly uninhabited – in addition to parts of Southeast Sulawesi such as Balantak and Mendono. Inhabitants of Peleng were subjected to slavery. Banggai also had dependencies in the eastern parts of Sulawesi's East Peninsula.

During this time, the island of Banggai was central to trade in foodstuffs in the area. Another Dutch figure from 1679 gave the kingdom's population as "10,000 able-bodied men", mostly non-Muslims. A later estimate from 1706 noted that some 90 percent of the population lived in Peleng – the total population estimate being as high as 21,560. During this time, Banggai was located between the powerful states of Ternate and Gowa, though Banggai later came under influence of Ternate following the Treaty of Bongaya in 1667, with Ternate receiving annual tribute from Banggai and appointing its ruler.

Due to continuous raids, the settlement of Banggai was moved at least 3 times between the late 17th and early 18th centuries. In 1690, the King of Banggai, Jangkal, relocated to the town of Mendono due to political instability. Bugis traders began to frequent Mendono and became more influential than far-off Ternate. Banggai frequently harbored Bugis chiefs and would act independently from the Ternateans. In 1708, the king Kalukubulang moved to Balantak after protracted conflict with the Banggai nobility.

During the late 17th and early 18th centuries, the Dutch East India Company attempted to spread its influence to Banggai with little success. During this time, Banggai was also subjected to raids from Papuans and routinely fought with the Tambuku and Buton polities. In 1879 the slave trade was abolished, although it would continue illegally.

Banggai was a center for trepangers, and many Chinese would come to Banggai for trepang.

=== Dutch East Indies and Indonesia ===
In 1907, Ternate ceded territories including Banggai to the Dutch East Indies, and the following year the king of Banggai signed a treaty with the Dutch putting the kingdom under Dutch control. Banggai's territories were administered through two Onderafdeling – the islands and the mainland.

After the independence of Indonesia, territories that comprised the Banggai kingdom was reorganized into the Central Sulawesi province, with an administrative reorganization in 1952 removing any legal powers of the kingdom. Today, the former territories of the kingdom are divided into the regencies of Banggai, Banggai Islands and Banggai Laut.

The population of Banggai was divided between the Muslim and Alfuru population. The Muslims resided mainly along the coast, while the Alfurus lived in the remote jungle. An 1890 estimate of the Alfuru population in Peleng and Banggai stood at around 10,000.

== Government ==
Although the position is hereditary, the king of Banggai is ultimately appointed by the Sultan of Ternate, and acts as the polity's chief executive. The king is aided by four advisers, who also help in monitoring four autonomous local chiefs known as the basalo sangkap. As an example, the 1706 Dutch estimate noted that Banggai had a population of 1,450, with the king of Banggai only having 150 men and the rest under the 4 local chiefs.

== Bibliography ==
- Andaya, Leonard Y. (1993). The world of Maluku: eastern Indonesia in the early modern period. University of Hawaii Press. ISBN 9780824814908.
- Henley, David (2005). Fertility, Food and Fever: Population, Economy and Environment in North and Central Sulawesi, 1600–1930. KITLV Press. ISBN 9789067182096.
- Velthoen, Esther J. (1997). "Politics of Violence in Eastern Sulawesi". The Last Stand of Asian Autonomies: Responses to Modernity in the Diverse States of Southeast Asia and Korea, 1750–1900. Springer. pp. 367–386. ISBN 9781349257607.
- Direktorat Jenderal Kebudayaan (1984). Sejarah Daerah Sulawesi Tengah (in Indonesian).
