= Batui language =

Austronesian language spoken in Sulawesi, Indonesia

Batui
- Native to: Indonesia
- Region: Sulawesi
- Native speakers: 2,900 (2007)
- Language family: Austronesian: Malayo-Polynesian; Celebic; Saluan–Banggai; Saluanic; Batui

Language codes
- ISO 639-3: zbt
- Glottolog: batu1260

Batui is an Austronesian language spoken by a small group of people on the eastern peninsula of the island of Sulawesi.
