= Toili =

Toili is an administrative district (kecamatan) in the Banggai Regency of Central Sulawesi, Indonesia. It is a largely agricultural area with palm oil plantations, gold mining, and gas and petroleum production. Transmigration policies have brought people from Java and the Lesser Sunda Islands. The district had an area of 762.63 km^{2} and the population was 34,420 at the 2020 census, comprising the town of Cendana and 24 rural villages (desa). However in 2023-24, ten of those villages were removed from Toili District to form a new Toili Raya district.
