= Bobongko language =

Austronesian language spoken in Sulawesi, Indonesia

Bobongko
- Native to: Indonesia
- Region: Sulawesi
- Native speakers: 1,500 (2001)
- Language family: Austronesian: Malayo-Polynesian; Celebic; Saluan–Banggai; Saluanic; Bobongko

Language codes
- ISO 639-3: bgb
- Glottolog: bobo1255
- ELP: Bobongko

Bobongko is an Austronesian language of the Togian Islands off the eastern peninsula of the island of Sulawesi. It belongs to the Saluan–Banggai branch of the Celebic subgroup. Bobongko also contains several loanwords of Gorontalo–Mongondow origin.
