= Andio language =

Austronesian language spoken in Sulawesi, Indonesia

Andio
- Masama
- Native to: Indonesia
- Region: Sulawesi
- Native speakers: 335 (2010)
- Language family: Austronesian: Malayo-Polynesian; Celebic; Saluan–Banggai; Saluanic; Andio

Language codes
- ISO 639-3: bzb
- Glottolog: andi1257
- ELP: Andio

Andio (Andio’o), or Masama, is an Austronesian language spoken at the tip of the eastern peninsula of the island of Sulawesi, Indonesia in two villages, Taugi and Tangeban. It is an endangered language, with estimates from 335-1,150 speakers. It belongs to the Saluan–Banggai branch of the Celebic subgroup.
