= Balantak people =

Balantak
Regions with significant populations
- Central Sulawesi

Languages
- Bahasa Indonesia, Balantak

Religion
- Islam (majority), Protestantism (minority)

Related ethnic groups
- Banggai • Saluan

Balantak is an ethnic group residing in Banggai Regency, Central Sulawesi, Indonesia. The Balantak community is divided into two sub-ethnic groups: the Tanoturan and the Dale-Dale. Most Balantak people in Banggai live on the East Peninsula.

== Etymology ==
Balantak originates from the word Bala, which means fence or fortress, and Tak, which means us. Hence, Balantak can be interpreted as our defense.

== Demography ==
The Balantak live in Banggai Regency in Central Sulawesi. The total population is estimated to be around 30,000.

== History ==
According to belief, the origin of the Balantak people began with the receding seawater in the land of Balantak, known as Bokol Balu, due to human actions that violated the law. Bokol Balu then destroyed part of the population, and those who survived became the group that formed the Balantak tribe.

In the past, the Balantak people were part of the Kingdom of Banggai. However, there is no longer any influence of the kingdom on their social stratification. Initially, the Balantak people worshiped ancestral spirits and deities, such as the solar deity called Mola and the earth deity called Kere. Today, the Balantak people have embraced Islam or Christianity. Despite the presence of Islam and Christianity, remnants of their traditional beliefs are still evident.

== Language ==
The Balantak people speak Balantak. The Balantak language is part of the Loinang languages, which belong to the Ingkar language group. To preserve their local language, the Balantak community has developed an electronic dictionary Balantak-Indonesian. It was launched during the 57th anniversary celebration of Banggai Regency in 2017, led by the Governor of Central Sulawesi, H. Longki Djanggola.

== Social life ==
The Balantak people rely on agriculture as their main livelihood. They cultivate rice in fields using a shifting cultivation and slash-and-burn system, and they grow tubers and coconut as key commodities. In addition, they engage in gathering forest products and hunting fish and wild animals as supplementary activities alongside farming.

The Balantak people are one of the major ethnic groups in the Banggai Regency, alongside two other ethnic groups, the Banggai and Saluan. Meanwhile, Balantak is one of the 12 ethnic groups residing in the Central Sulawesi Province. The other 11 ethnic groups besides Balantak are Kaili, Kulawi, Lore, Pamona, Mori, Bungku, Saluan, Banggai, Buol, and Totoli.

Four cultural elements are considered the most important for the Balantak people. These are dignity, kinship, social order, and generosity. In terms of kinship, the Balantak community is known for having strong familial bonds. The spirit of mutual cooperation (gotong royong) in daily life is one of its manifestations.

== Culture ==
=== Kinship system ===
As mentioned earlier, kinship is one of the most important aspects of Balantak culture. The kinship bond in Balantak culture is bilateral, with nuclear families forming units called bense. Usually, two or three bense inhabit a village, and these villages are further grouped into a residential unit or settlement called bosano. The term bosano is also used for the village head who leads a certain area.

The Balantak also has its own way of uniting two families into a kinship system through a marriage tradition called Monsara no Ana Wiwin Nono, which means "secret investigation." This tradition is performed when someone is about to marry off their son. The goal is to observe closely the behavior of the woman who will become their daughter-in-law. Before formally proposing, a family member from the groom's side will visit the woman's house to inform her family of their intention to marry her. Then, the groom's family will present their plan to propose to the woman's parents.

The proposal stage is carried out by the groom's family, who visits the woman's parents' house bringing items such as betel leaves, areca nuts, slaked lime, gambier, and some money. Three days later, both families gather again to discuss the details of the wedding plans.

=== Religion ===
Most Balantak are Muslim while a minority are Christian although indigenous beliefs are still influential.
