= African Indonesians =

Orang Indonesia keturunan Afrika (Indonesian)

Regions with significant populations
- Indonesia (Java)

Languages
- Indonesian · English · Languages of Africa

Religion
- Christianity · Islam

Related ethnic groups
- African people

African people in Indonesia refers to Indonesians of full or partial African ancestry. They may have been immigrated to or born in Indonesia. The first wave of immigration was in the 19th century, between 1830 and 1872, when West Africans were recruited from the Dutch Gold Coast for military service and indentured servitude in the East Indies.
