= Bungku people =

Bungku people To Bungku / To Bunggu
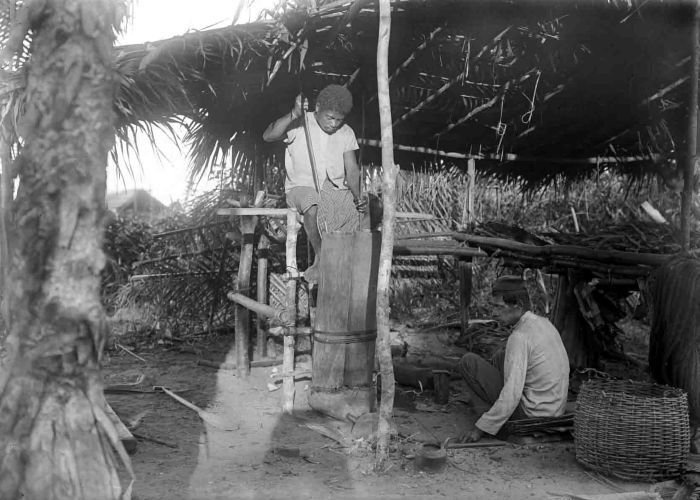
- Bungku ironsmiths working. Collection of Tropenmuseum, photo taken between 1900 and 1920.

Regions with significant populations
- Indonesia (Central Sulawesi)

Languages
- Bungku language, Indonesian language

Religion
- Islam and Christianity

Bungku people (Bungku: To Bungku or To Bunggu) are an ethnic group who mostly resides in North Bungku, South Bungku, Central Bungku, and Menui Islands districts di Morowali Regency, in Central Sulawesi province of Indonesia. This ethnic group is divided into several sub-groups, namely Lambatu, Epe, Ro'tua, Reta, and Wowoni. Bungku people have their own language, called Bungku language, which is one of their characteristic and serves as a means of communication between themselves.

== History ==
Bungku people used to have their own small kingdom, the Bungku Kingdom, which was also called Tambuku or Tombuku Kingdom in Dutch report. The kingdom, along with other small kingdom in the eastern shore of Central Sulawesi, fell under the Dutch Colonial Empire since the middle of 19th century.

== Culture ==
Most of the Bungku are farmers that cultivate crops such as rice, coconuts, corn, yams, sago and cloves.

Most Bungku people embrace Islam while a minority practice Christianity.

== See also ==
- Bungku, an administrative centre of Morowali Regency
- Bungku language, an Austronesian language, part of the Bungku–Tolaki languages
