= Banggai people =

Ethnic group in Indonesia

Regions with significant populations
- Central Sulawesi, Indonesia
- 180,000

Languages
- Banggai

Religion
- Islam

Related ethnic groups
- Saluan, Balantak

Banggai people is an ethnic group inhabited almost whole part of Banggai Islands Regency, Banggai Sea Regency, and parts of Banggai Regency.

Ancestors of the Banggai originating from Banggai Sea region which historically part of Kingdom of Banggai and also from Banggai Islands. The Banggai divided into two subgroups, the Sea-sea people who live in mountainous area and the Banggai who live in the coastal area.

The Banggai have similarities in language, culture and tradition to Saluan people and Balantak people which inhabited Banggai Regency. all of the Banggai is Muslim. The Banggai's profession traditionally farmer, fisherman, government officials, and others.
