= Banggai language =

Austronesian language spoken in Sulawesi, Indonesia

Banggai
- Native to: Indonesia
- Region: Sulawesi
- Ethnicity: Banggai and Seasea
- Native speakers: 88,000 (2010 census)
- Language family: Austronesian: Malayo-Polynesian; Celebic; Saluan–Banggai; Eastern; Banggai

Language codes
- ISO 639-3: bgz
- Glottolog: bang1368

The Banggai language is the main language spoken by the inhabitants of the Banggai Archipelago off the island of Sulawesi. It belongs to the Saluan–Banggai branch of the Celebic subgroup.

Historically, Banggai was a spoken language without a long literary history. The earliest surviving manuscript in the Banggai language comes from the 19th century, the account of a Banggai fisherman who was sold into slavery by Maguindanaoan raiders in the 1860s-70s before escaping.

== Phonology ==
=== Consonants ===
		Labial	Dental/ Alveolar	Palatal	Velar	Glottal
Nasal		m	n		ŋ	
Plosive	voiceless	p	t		k	ʔ
Plosive	voiced	b	d		ɡ	
Plosive	prenasal vl.	ᵐp	ⁿt		ᵑk	
Plosive	prenasal vd.	ᵐb	ⁿd		ᵑɡ	
Fricative			s			h
Rhotic			r			
Lateral			l			
Approximant		w		j		

- /s/ may also be heard as prenasal [ⁿs] when after nasal sounds.
- Other sounds like [tʃ, dʒ, ɲ] are heard in loanwords from neighboring languages.

=== Vowels ===
	Front	Central	Back
Close	i iː		u uː
Mid	e eː		o oː
Open		a aː	

- Vowels /e, o/ can also be heard as [ɛ, ɔ] in closed syllables.
