= Banggai Regency =

Regency in Central Sulawesi, Indonesia

Banggai Regency Kabupaten Banggai
- Regency
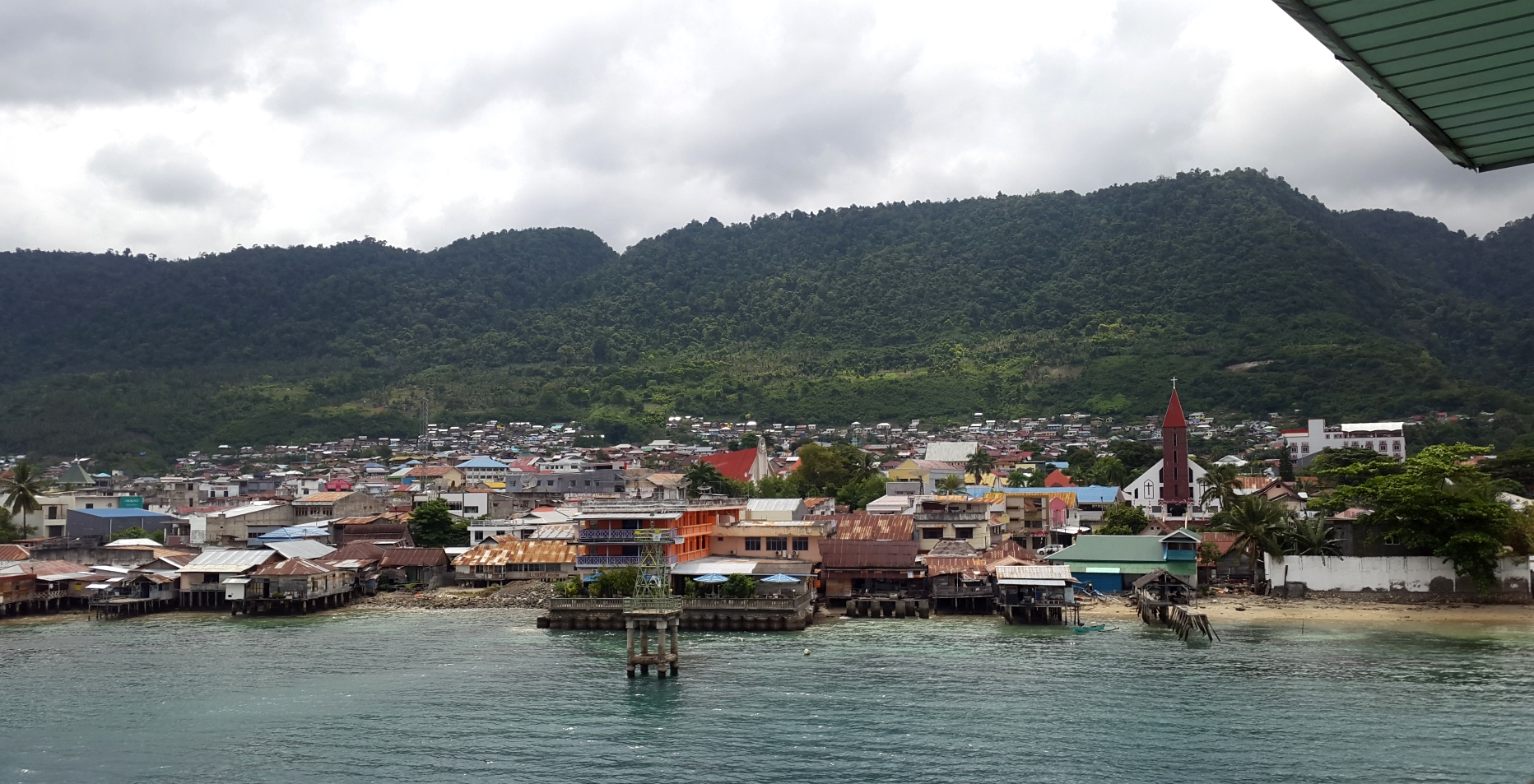
- Port of Luwuk

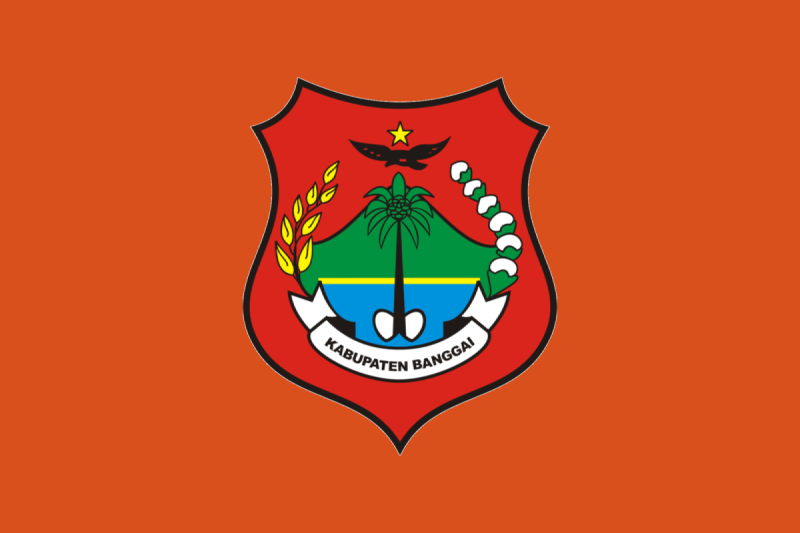
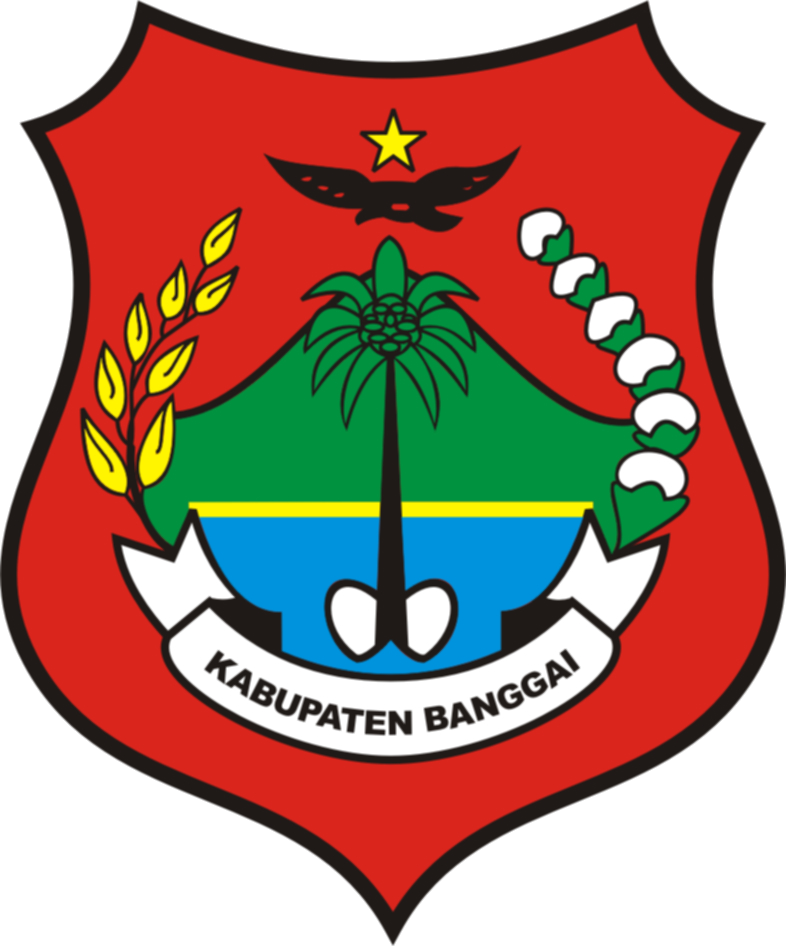
- Flag Coat of arms

- Location within Central Sulawesi

- Location in Sulawesi and Indonesia Banggai Regency (Indonesia)
- Coordinates: 0.957091°S 122.558593°E
- Country: Indonesia
- Region: Sulawesi
- Province: Central Sulawesi
- Capital: Luwuk

Government
  - Regent: Aminuddin Tamoreka
  - Vice Regent: Furqaniddin Masulili

Area
  - Total: 9,672.70 km^{2} (3,734.65 sq mi)

Population (mid 2025 estimate)
  - Total: 382,009
  - Density: 39.4935/km^{2} (102.288/sq mi)
- Time zone: UTC+8 (ICST)
- Area code: (+62) 461
- Website: banggaikab.go.id

The Banggai Regency (Indonesian: Kabupaten Banggai) is a regency located at the eastern end of Central Sulawesi Province of Indonesia. It makes up a re-established regency (kabupaten), created on 4 October 1999 by splitting the existing Banggai Regency into this smaller Banggai Regency situated entirely on the mainland of Sulawesi (capital, Luwuk) and a new Banggai Islands Regency comprising the offshore islands to the southeast (capital, Banggai town) which are separated from mainland Sulawesi by the Peleng Straits (Selat Peleng). The residual Banggai Regency covers an area of 9,672.70 km^{2} and had a population of 323,626 at the 2010 census and 362,275 at the 2020 census; the official estimate as at mid 2025 was 382,009 (comprising 193,782 males and 188,227 females).

Culturally and linguistically the regency comprises two geographical sectors (which have no administrative significance). The eastern sector covers the Balantak Peninsula, largely populated by the Balantak people speaking their language, centred on the administrative capital of Luwuk. The western (Toili/Batui) sector, which covers the central part of the northeastern arm of Sulawesi, mainly comprise the Saluan people sharing the Saluan language; of its nine districts, the first six are on the south side of the peninsula and drain towards Tolo Bay, while the last three are on the north side of the peninsula and drain towards Tomini Bay.

== Administration ==
At the 2010 census, the Banggai regency was divided into eighteen districts (kecamatan). Subsequently, another five districts have been created by the division of four existing districts in 2012 and 2015; a further (24th) district - Toili Jaya - has been created in 2023-24 from part of Toili District.

The statistics for these districts are tabulated below with their areas and their 2010 and 2020 Census populations, together with the official estimates as at mid 2025. The table also includes the locations of the district administrative centres, the number of villages in each district (291 rural desa and 46 urban kelurahan in total), and its post code.

Kode Wilayah	Name of District (kecamatan)	Area in km^{2}	Pop'n census 2010	Pop'n census 2020	Pop'n estimate mid 2025	Admin centre	No. of kelurahan	No. of desa	Post code
72.01.09	Toili	762.63	30,716	34,420	21,914	Cendana Pura	1 ^{(a)}	14	94764
72.01.12	Toili Barat (West Toili)	993.67	20,708	22,860	24,844	Sindang Sari	-	17	94766
72.01.14	Moilong	220.32	18,097	18,636	20,374	Toili	-	16	94765
72.01.24	Toili Jaya	^{(b)}	^{(b)}	^{(b)}	16,047	Toilsu	-	10	94764
72.01.01	Batui	1,062.36	14,725	19,486	19,207	Batui	7 ^{(c)}	6	94762
72.01.15	Batui Selatan (South Batui)	327.97	12,847	15,560	15,635	Sinorang	-	10	94763
72.01.02	Bunta	579.00	18,277	19,829	20,279	Bunta	4 ^{(d)}	18	94753
72.01.13	Nuhon	1,107.00	17,886	19,105	20,475	Tomeang	-	20	94754
72.01.17	Simpang Raya	243.69	13,589	14,357	15,018	Rantau Jaya	-	12	94755
Sub-totals for	Western sector	1,929.69	146,845	164,253	173,793		12	123	
72.01.03	Kintom	428.78	13,023	11,343	11,979	Kintom	3 ^{(e)}	11	94761
72.01.04	Luwuk	72.82	73,905	34,849	33,293	Luwuk	8 ^{(f)}	2	94711: 94713
72.01.11	Luwuk Timur (East Luwuk)	216.30	10,557	12,081	13,721	Hunduhon	-	13	94723
72.01.21	Luwuk Utara (North Luwuk)	246.08	^{(g)}	20,073	20,998	Biak	2 ^{(h)}	9	94711
72.01.20	Luwuk Selatan (South Luwuk)	119.80	^{(g)}	25,198	25,591	Simpong	9 ^{(i)}	1	94717
72.01.23	Nambo	169.70	^{(j)}	8,548	9,122	Lontio	6 ^{(k)}	5	94760
72.01.07	Pagimana	957.34	22,223	23,286	26,520	Pagimana	3 ^{(m)}	30	94751
72.01.08	Bualemo	862.00	16,968	17,650	18,486	Bualemo	-	20	94752
72.01.16	Lobu	138.44	3,323	3,765	4,161	Lobu	-	10	94750
72.01.05	Lamala	220.66	12,510	7,008	7,433	Bonebobakal	-	12	94771
72.01.10	Masama	231.64	10,517	11,585	12,587	Tangeban	-	14	94772
72.01.22	Mantoh	226.00	^{(n)}	6,838	7,343	Sobol	-	10	94770
72.01.06	Balantak	196.46	9,300	5,966	6,181	Balantak	3 ^{(p)}	10	94773
72.01.18	Balantak Selatan (South Balantak)	146.50	4,455	5,165	5,596	Tongke	-	11	94774
72.01.19	Balantak Utara (North Balantak)	143.60	^{(r)}	4,667	5,205	Teku	-	10	94775
Sub-totals for	Eastern sector	4,376.06	176,781	198,022	208,216		34	168	
Totals for	Regency	9,672.70	323,626	362,275	382,009	Luwuk	46	291	

Notes: (a) the kelurahan is the town of Cendana, rather than the administrative centre in the desa of Cendana Pura.
(b) included in the figure for Toili District, from which it was split away in 2022. (c) the kelurahan are Bakung, Balantang, Batui, Bugis, Lamo, Sisipan and Tolando.
(d) Bunta I, Bunta II, Kalaka and Salabenda. (e) Kintom, Lontio and Mendono. (f) Baru, Bungin, Bungin Timur, Kaleke, Karaton, Luwuk, Mangkio Baru and Soho.
(g) The 2010 populations of Luwuk Utara and Luwuk Selatan Districts are included in the figure for Luwuk District, from which they were split away in 2015 and 2012 respectively.
(h) Kilongan and Kilongan Permai. (i) Bukit Mambual, Hanga-Hanga, Hanga-Hanga Permai, Jole, Kompo, Maahas, Simpong, Tanjung Tuwis and Tombang Permai.
(j) The 2010 population of Nambo District is included in the figure for Kintom District, from which it was split away in 2012.
(k) Lontio, Lontio Baru, Nambo Bosaa, Nambo Lempek, Nambo Lempek Baru and Nambo Padang. (m) Basabungan, Pagimana and Pakowa.
(n) The 2010 population of Mantoh District is included in the figure for Lamala District, from which it was split away in 2012. (p) Balantak, Dale-Dale and Talang Batu.
(r) The 2010 population of Balantak Utara District is included in the figure for Balantak District, from which it was split away in 2012.
