= Balantak language =

Austronesian language spoken in Sulawesi, Indonesia

Balantak
- Wurung Balantak
- Native to: Indonesia
- Region: Sulawesi
- Ethnicity: Balantak people
- Native speakers: (30,000 cited 2000)
- Language family: Austronesian: Malayo-Polynesian; Celebic; Saluan-Banggai; Eastern; Balantak

Language codes
- ISO 639-3: blz
- Glottolog: bala1315

Balantak is an Austronesian language spoken at the head of the eastern peninsula of Sulawesi, Indonesia. It is classified as a member of the Saluan-Banggai branch of the Celebic subgroup. The Balantak language is the primary language of the Balantak people. Although 90% of the population are also proficient in Indonesian, the vernacular is still vigorously used in everyday contexts, and most children only speak Balantak before entering school.

== Phonology ==
Balantak has the following phoneme inventory:

Consonants
		Labial	Alveolar	Palatal	Velar	Glottal
Nasal		m	n		ŋ ⟨ng⟩	
Plosive	voiceless	p	t	t͡ʃ ⟨c⟩ (Note: Only occur in loanwords)	k	ʔ ⟨'⟩
Plosive	voiced	b	d	d͡ʒ ⟨j⟩	g	
Fricative			s			h
Lateral			l			
Trill			r			
Approximant		w		j ⟨y⟩		

Vowels
	Front	Central	Back
High	i		u
Mid	ɛ ⟨e⟩		ɔ ⟨o⟩
Low		a	

Sequences of like vowels are phonetically realized as long vowels, e.g. toop [tɔ:p] 'cigarette', nuur [nu:r] 'coconut'.
