= Banggai Sea Regency =

Regency in Central Sulawesi, Indonesia

Banggai Sea Regency Kabupaten Banggai Laut
- Regency
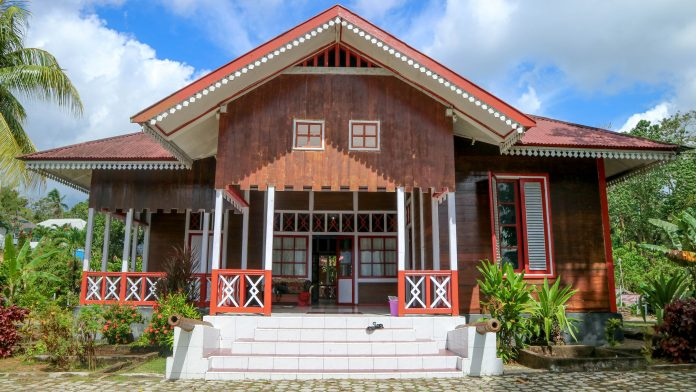
- Palace of Banggai Kingdom in Banggai

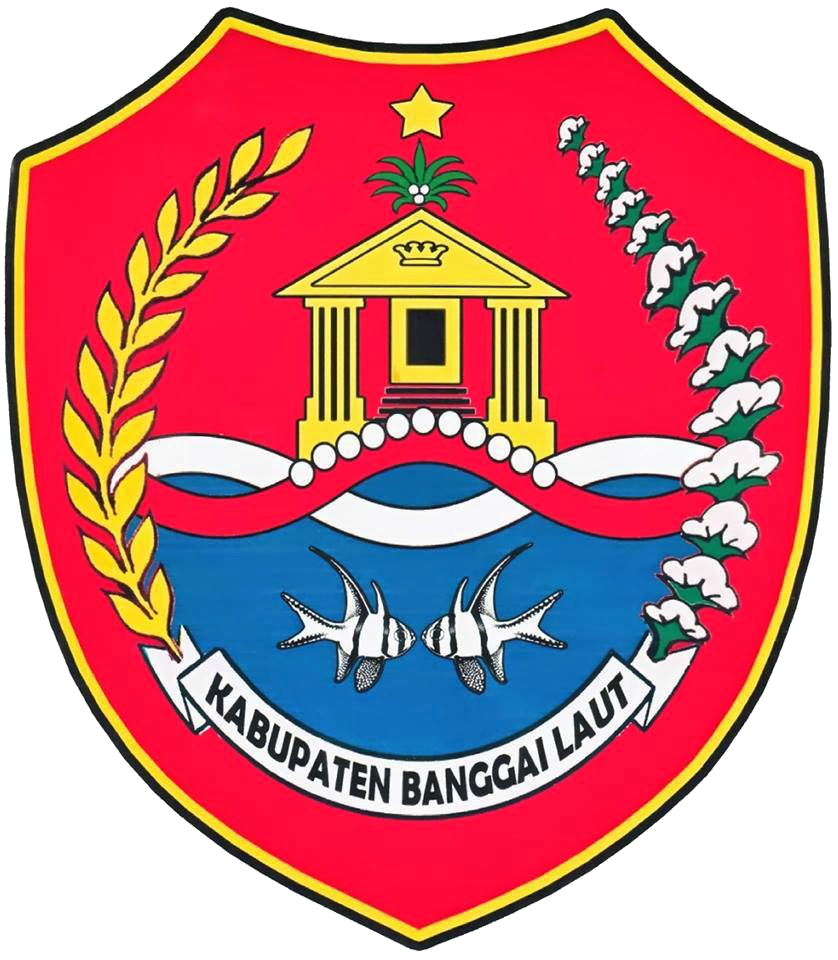
- Coat of arms

- Location within Central Sulawesi

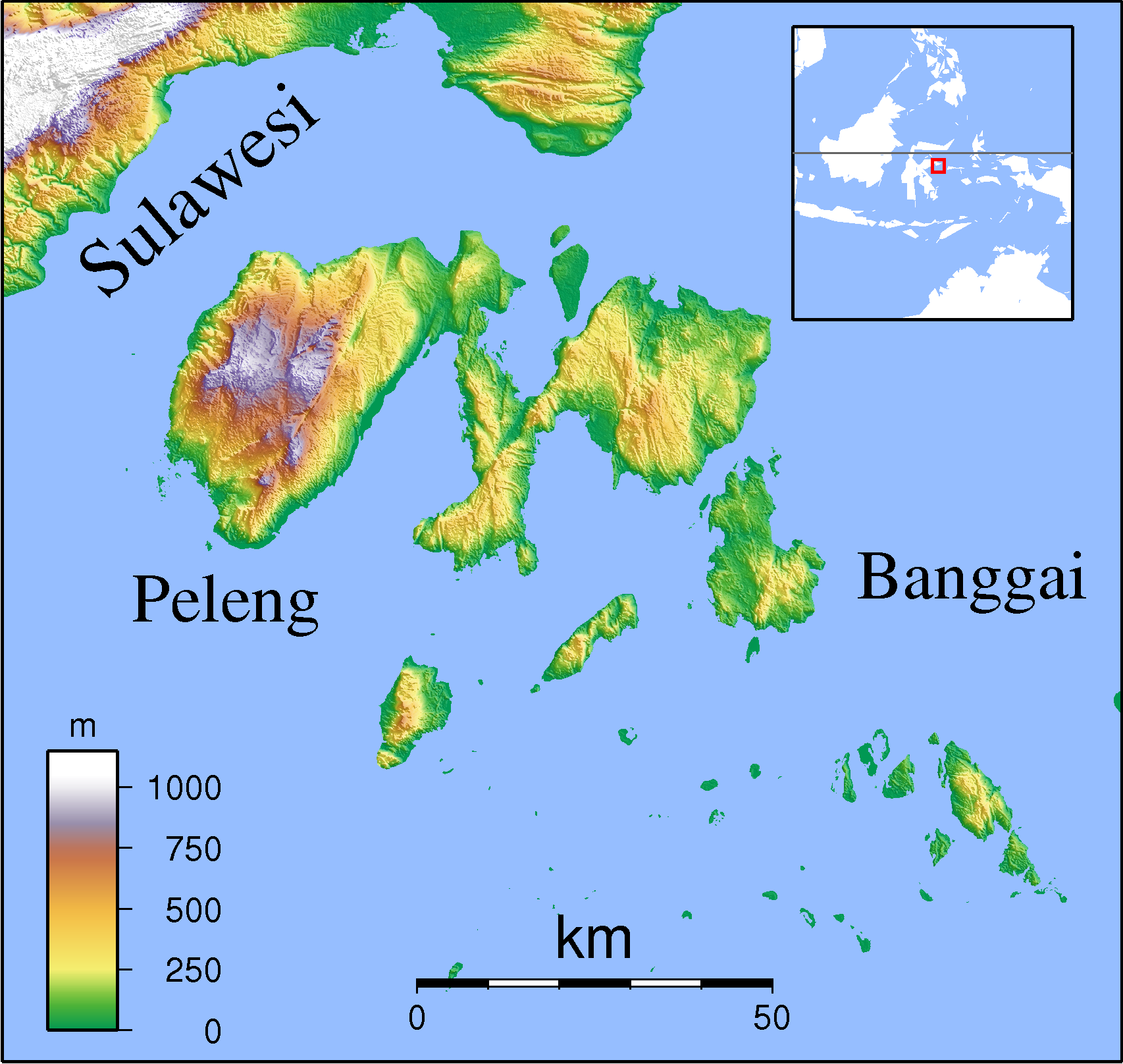
- Location in Banggai Islands, Sulawesi and Indonesia Banggai Sea Regency (Sulawesi) Banggai Sea Regency (Indonesia)
- Coordinates: 1.5888°S 123.5008°E
- Country: Indonesia
- Province: Central Sulawesi
- Established: 14 December 2012
- Capital: Banggai

Government
  - Regent: Sofyan Kaepa
  - Vice Regent: Ablit H. Ilyas

Area
  - Total: 12,882.45 km^{2} (4,973.94 sq mi)
  - Land: 725.67 km^{2} (280.18 sq mi)

Population (mid 2025 estimate)
  - Total: 78,618
  - Density: 108.34/km^{2} (280.60/sq mi)
- Time zone: UTC+8 (ICST)
- Area code: (+62) 461
- Website: banggailautkab.go.id

Banggai Sea Regency (Indonesian: Kabupaten Banggai Laut, "Marine Banggai Regency") is a regency in the province of Central Sulawesi, Indonesia. The regency was established on 14 December 2012, partitioned from the Banggai Islands Regency. It comprises the southern part of the Banggai Islands archipelago, including the main island of Banggai itself (including 40 offshore islets), the islands of Labobo and Bangkurung to the southwest of Banggai Island, and the numerous small Bowokan Islands (Kepulauan Bokan) to the southeast; it does not include the larger island of Peleng to the north (between Banggai Island and the mainland of Sulawesi) which substantially comprises the residual Banggai Islands Regency.

The new Banggai Sea Regency covers a land area of 725.67 km^{2} (and an associated marine area of 12,156.78 km^{2}), and the districts now comprising the new Regency had a population of 62,183 at the 2010 Census and 70,435 at the 2020 Census; the official population estimate as at mid 2025 was 78,618 (comprising 39,718 males and 38,900 females).

== Administration ==
The new Banggai Sea Regency is composed of seven districts (kecamatan), tabulated below with their areas and their 2010 Census and 2020 Census populations, together with the official estimates as at mid 2025. The table also includes the location of the district headquarters, the number of administrative villages in each district (in total, 63 rural desa and 3 urban kelurahan), and its postal codes.

Kode Wilayah	Name of District (kecamatan)	Area in km^{2}	Pop'n Census 2010	Pop'n Census 2020	Pop'n Estimate mid 2025	Admin centre	No. of villages	Post codes
72.11.04	Bangkurung (island)	116.55	8,196	8,928	9,591	Lantibung	12 ^{(a)}	94892
72.11.05	Labobo (island) ^{(b)}	85.65	5,341	6,036	6,430	Mansaleang	8	94893
72.11.02	Banggai Utara (North Banggai)	58.05	6,007	7,042	7,670	Lokotoy	6	94896
72.11.01	Banggai (district) ^{(c)}	86.95	19,977	22,591	26,099	Lompio	10	94891
72.11.07	Banggai Tengah (Central Banggai)	68.19	6,362	7,902	9.134	Adean	8	94895
72.11.06	Banggai Selatan (South Banggai)	81.20	4,809	5,803	6,680	Matanga	6	94890
72.11.03	Bokan Kepulauan ^{(d)} (Bowokan Islands)	229.08	11,571	12,133	13,014	Bungin	16	94894
	Totals	725.67	62,263	70,435	78,618		66	

Notes: (a) including three kelurahan - Dodung, Lompio, and Tano Bonunungan. (b) including 10 small offshore islands. (c) including 42 small offshore islands.
(d) the Bowokan Islands to the southeast of Banggai Island, comprises 91 islands of which the largest is Pulau Salue Besar (Greater Salue Island, formerly Melilis Island); smaller islands include Timpaus, Telapo and Kemal Karaeng.

== Climate ==
Banggai has a tropical rainforest climate (Af) with moderate rainfall from September to December and heavy to very heavy rainfall from January to August.

Climate data for Banggai
Month	Jan	Feb	Mar	Apr	May	Jun	Jul	Aug	Sep	Oct	Nov	Dec	Year
Mean daily maximum °C (°F)	30.7 (87.3)	30.8 (87.4)	30.9 (87.6)	31.2 (88.2)	30.8 (87.4)	30.3 (86.5)	29.8 (85.6)	30.5 (86.9)	31.2 (88.2)	31.8 (89.2)	32.1 (89.8)	31.2 (88.2)	30.9 (87.7)
Daily mean °C (°F)	26.8 (80.2)	26.9 (80.4)	27.0 (80.6)	27.2 (81.0)	27.1 (80.8)	26.7 (80.1)	26.2 (79.2)	26.5 (79.7)	26.7 (80.1)	27.0 (80.6)	27.7 (81.9)	27.2 (81.0)	26.9 (80.5)
Mean daily minimum °C (°F)	23.0 (73.4)	23.0 (73.4)	23.1 (73.6)	23.2 (73.8)	23.5 (74.3)	23.2 (73.8)	22.7 (72.9)	22.5 (72.5)	22.3 (72.1)	22.3 (72.1)	23.4 (74.1)	23.2 (73.8)	23.0 (73.3)
Average rainfall mm (inches)	137 (5.4)	164 (6.5)	209 (8.2)	249 (9.8)	286 (11.3)	361 (14.2)	238 (9.4)	149 (5.9)	121 (4.8)	96 (3.8)	100 (3.9)	103 (4.1)	2,213 (87.3)
Source: Climate-Data.org
