= Buka Buka Island =

Island in the Molucca Sea

Buka Buka
Pulau Bukabuka
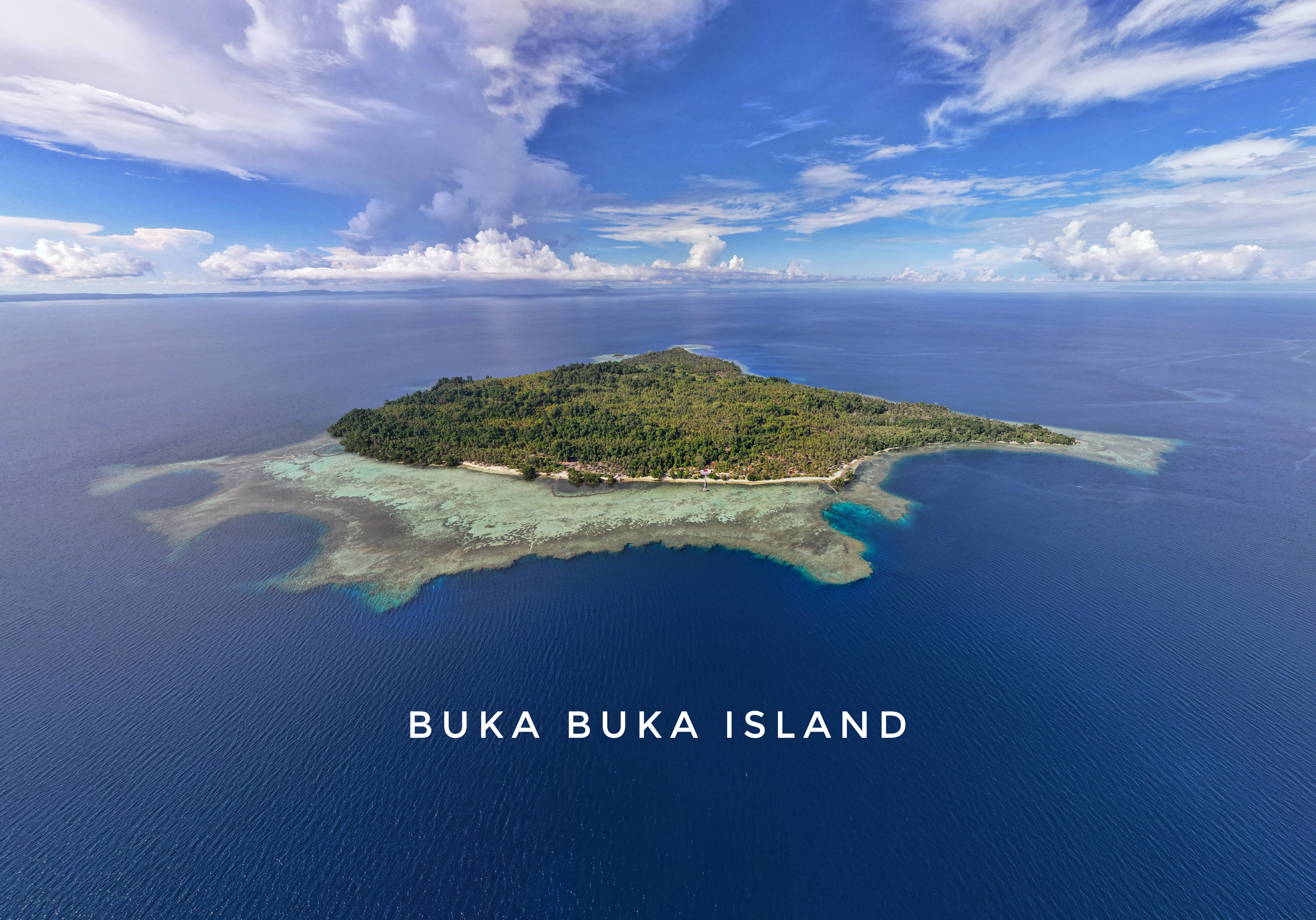
- Buka Buka Island in 2022

- Location within Indonesia

Geography
- Location: Southeast Asia
- Coordinates: 0°44′38″S 121°45′44″E
- Archipelago: Togian Islands
- Adjacent to: Molucca Sea
- Area: 1.6 km^{2} (0.62 sq mi)
- Width: 2 km (1.2 mi)
- Highest elevation: 132 m (433 ft)

Administration
- Indonesia
- Province: Central Sulawesi
- Regency: Tojo Una-Una Regency
- District: Ampana Tete

Buka Buka Island (Indonesian: Pulau Bukabuka) is a 160-hectare (400-acre) island in Central Sulawesi, Indonesia. Administratively, the island belongs to Tete B village in Ampana Tete district of Tojo Una-Una Regency, although the village settlement itself is located on mainland Sulawesi.

The island is located about 7 miles (11 km) northeast of Tanjung Api. It rises to an elevation of 433 feet (132 m) and is surrounded by coastal waters in the Maluku Sea.

== Geography ==
Buka Buka Island has an area of approximately 160 hectares (400 acres) and is about 2 kilometres (1.2 mi) wide. Around two-thirds of the island's land area consists of coconut plantations, while approximately one-third retains forest cover.

The island has white-sand beaches and is surrounded by coastal ecosystems including coral reefs and seagrass beds.

Fresh water has historically been scarce. People working on the island traditionally had to walk through the interior to collect water, while water was also transported from the mainland during the early development of tourism facilities.

Although the island is geographically associated with the Togian Islands, it lies outside the administrative boundary of Kepulauan Togean National Park. It forms part of the wider Togean Tojo Una-Una Biosphere Reserve, which was designated by UNESCO in 2019.

There is no traditional village settlement on the island; the settlement of Tete B is situated on mainland Sulawesi.

== Economy ==
The island's economy is primarily associated with coconut cultivation, copra production, fishing and tourism. Coconut plantations occupy much of the island and are worked by farmers travelling from nearby mainland communities.

One resort, Reconnect, operates on the island. The resort is managed by Thomas Despin and began developing tourism infrastructure on Buka Buka before 2020. Tourism provides employment and creates demand for locally supplied goods, including fish purchased from traditional fishermen.

Visitor access is by private boat from Tete B. Boats operated or arranged by Reconnect run on request rather than according to a fixed public schedule.

During the early development of the resort, fresh water was imported from the mainland. A desalination system and solar-powered electricity infrastructure were subsequently installed. Water and electricity are also made available to fishermen and farmers working on the island.

== Environmental issues and conservation ==
In 2022, local authorities, community representatives and tourism operators discussed environmental issues affecting Buka Buka Island, including damage to coral reefs, marine waste and the capture of sea turtles.

The discussions included proposals for coral transplantation, improved management of boat and community access across reef areas, the construction of infrastructure intended to reduce damage to reefs and the possible creation of a conservation area.

Coral reef restoration and reforestation activities have also been undertaken on parts of the island.

== Flora and fauna ==
Buka Buka Island supports both terrestrial and marine fauna. Historical records identify the island as one of the recorded locations for Etrumeus albulina, a species of round herring, and as part of the recorded range of Pinjalo pinjalo, a species of snapper.

The island is also included in historical distribution records for Acanthurus pyroferus, a species of surgeonfish, and Callyodon oviceps, a parrotfish documented by de Beaufort in 1910.

Sea turtles occur in the waters around the island, and their capture has been identified as a local conservation concern.

Terrestrial fauna observed on the island include the Sulawesi bear cuscus (Ailurops ursinus), the coconut crab (Birgus latro), the reticulated python (Malayopython reticulatus) and the Togian water monitor (Varanus togianus).
