= Tumbulawa =

- Location in Central Sulawesi and Indonesia Tumbulawa (Indonesia)
- Coordinates: 0°10′23.124″S 121°36′40.4604″E
- Country: Indonesia
- Province: Central Sulawesi
- Regency: Tojo Una-Una Regency
- District: Una-Una District
- Elevation: 1,024 ft (312 m)

Population (2010)
  - Total: 1,226
- Time zone: UTC+8 (Indonesia Central Standard Time)

Tumbulawa is a village in Una-Una island, Central Sulawesi, Indonesia. Its population is 1226.

== Climate ==
Tumbulawa has a tropical rainforest climate (Af) with heavy to very heavy rainfall year-round.

Climate data for Tumbulawa
Month	Jan	Feb	Mar	Apr	May	Jun	Jul	Aug	Sep	Oct	Nov	Dec	Year
Mean daily maximum °C (°F)	29.3 (84.7)	29.4 (84.9)	29.6 (85.3)	29.8 (85.6)	29.8 (85.6)	28.9 (84.0)	28.4 (83.1)	29.3 (84.7)	29.9 (85.8)	30.7 (87.3)	30.4 (86.7)	29.9 (85.8)	29.6 (85.3)
Daily mean °C (°F)	25.2 (77.4)	25.3 (77.5)	25.5 (77.9)	25.6 (78.1)	25.9 (78.6)	25.1 (77.2)	24.6 (76.3)	25.1 (77.2)	25.3 (77.5)	25.8 (78.4)	25.8 (78.4)	25.7 (78.3)	25.4 (77.7)
Mean daily minimum °C (°F)	21.2 (70.2)	21.2 (70.2)	21.4 (70.5)	21.4 (70.5)	22.0 (71.6)	21.4 (70.5)	20.8 (69.4)	20.9 (69.6)	20.7 (69.3)	21.0 (69.8)	21.3 (70.3)	21.5 (70.7)	21.2 (70.2)
Average precipitation mm (inches)	116 (4.6)	140 (5.5)	140 (5.5)	229 (9.0)	289 (11.4)	313 (12.3)	306 (12.0)	203 (8.0)	193 (7.6)	175 (6.9)	163 (6.4)	124 (4.9)	2,391 (94.1)
Source: Climate-Data.org
