= Batudaka Island =

Island in Indonesia

Batudaka

Geography
- Coordinates: 0°28′50″S 121°48′49″E
- Area: 151.91 km^{2} (58.65 sq mi) (Note: Total area of district - the 9 villages (desa) comprising the island, including surrounding islets)
- Highest elevation: 351 m (1152 ft)

Administration
- Indonesia
- Province: Central Sulawesi
- Regency: Tojo Una-Una

Demographics
- Population: 5,933 (mid 2024 estimate)
- Pop. density: 39.21/km^{2} (101.55/sq mi)

Batudaka is an island of the Central Sulawesi province, located in the Gulf of Tomini. The largest island in the Togian archipelago, it has a land area of 151.91 square kilometres (including small offshore islets) and is divided administratively into the 9 villages (desa)which together form the Batudaka District of the Tojo Una-Una Regency.

== Geography ==
It is located in the Gulf of Tomini, separated from the island of Togean by only a narrow strait. The island has a forested, slightly hilly interior with a maximum elevation of 351 metres. Its land area is 151.91 square kilometres (including smaller offshore islands).

== Demographics ==
The populace largely consists of the Bajo people, referred locally as "boat men".

== Economy ==
The island attracts domestic and foreign tourists, and has seven guesthouses with a combined total of 57 rooms in Wakai. There is a single cash office of Central Sulawesi Bank as well.

The island is accessible from either Gorontalo (12 hour trip), Ampana or Luwuk (both 4 hour trips) by speedboat. A hospital is also on the island.

Agriculture is an important sector, with coconuts, cloves, corn and cocoa beans taking up the largest cultivation areas. Two markets - one daily and the other weekly - serve the local population.
