= Headland =

Landform extending into a body of water, often with significant height and drop

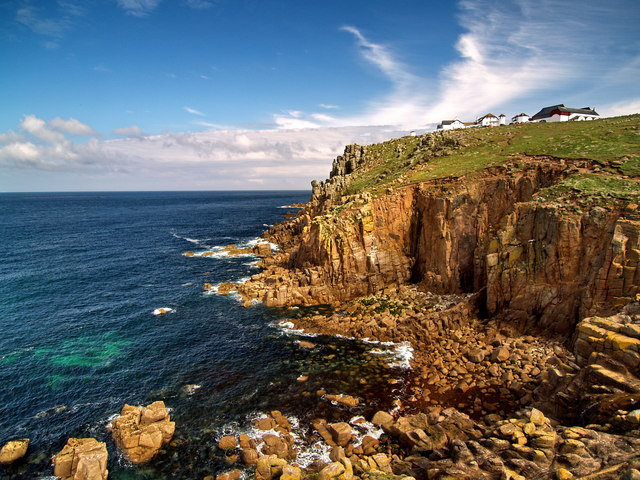
Land's End, England

A headland, also known as a head, is a coastal landform, a point of land usually high and often with a sheer drop, that extends into a body of water. It is a type of promontory. A headland of considerable size often is called a cape. Headlands are characterised by high, breaking waves, rocky shores, intense erosion, and steep sea cliff.

Headlands and bays are often found on the same coastline. A bay is flanked by land on three sides, whereas a headland is flanked by water on three sides. Headlands and bays form on discordant coastlines, where bands of rock of alternating resistance run perpendicular to the coast. Bays form when weak (less resistant) rocks (such as sands and clays) are eroded, leaving bands of stronger (more resistant) rocks (such as chalk, limestone, and granite) forming a headland, or peninsula. Through the deposition of sediment within the bay and the erosion of the headlands, coastlines eventually straighten out, then start the same process all over again.

== List of notable headlands ==
=== Africa ===
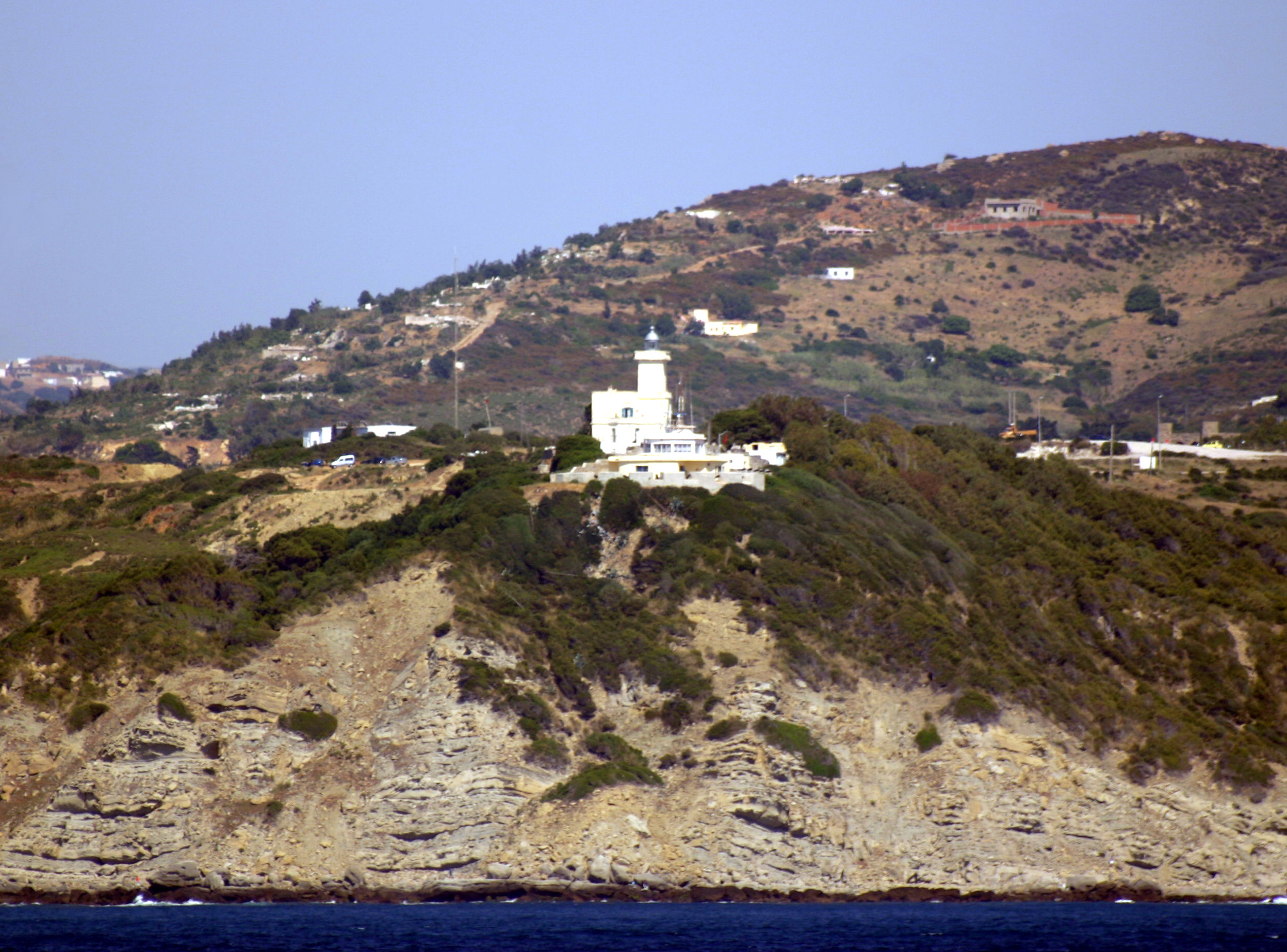
Cape Malabata, Morocco

- Cap Blanc, Mauritania
- Cap-Vert, Senegal
- Cape Agulhas, South Africa, Africa's southernmost point
- Cape Bojador, Morocco
- Cape Correntes, Mozambique
- Cape Delgado, Mozambique
- Cape Juby, Morocco
- Cape Malabata, Morocco
- Cape Spartel, Morocco
- Cape of Good Hope, South Africa
- Ras ben Sakka, Tunisia, Africa's northernmost point

=== Asia ===
- Beirut, Lebanon
- Cabo de Rama, Goa, India
- Cape Comorin or Kanyakumari, Tamil Nadu, India
- Cape Dezhnev, Russia
- Cape Engaño, Philippines
- Cape of Fire, Central Sulawesi, Indonesia
- Coconut Tree Hill, Mirissa, Sri Lanka
- Indira Point, Andaman and Nicobar Islands, India
- Korlai fort, Korlai, Maharashtra, India

=== Europe ===
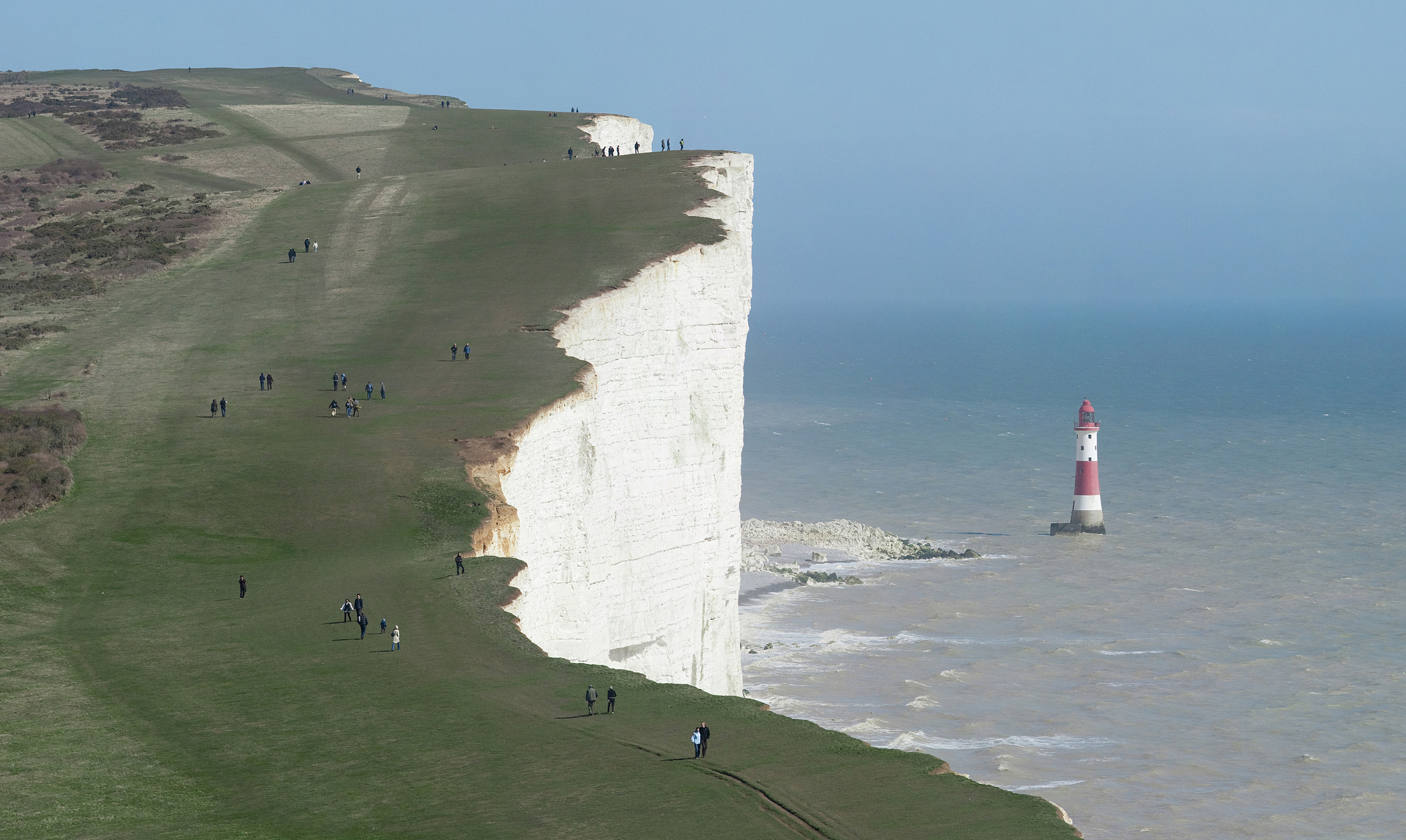
Cliffs at Beachy Head, England

- Beachy Head, England
- Cabo da Roca, Portugal, the western tip of mainland Europe
- Cap Gris-Nez, France
- Cape Arkona, Germany
- Cape Emine, Bulgaria
- Cape Enniberg, Faroe Islands
- Cape Finisterre, Galicia, Spain
- San Vito lo Capo, Sicily,Italy
- Cape Greco, Cyprus
- Cape Kaliakra, Bulgaria
- Cape St. Vincent/Sagres Point, Portugal, the southwestern tip of mainland Europe
- Cape Tainaron, Greece, the southernmost tip of mainland Europe
- Cape Wrath, Scotland
- Dungeness, England
- Gibraltar, British Overseas Territory
- Great Orme, Wales
- Hengistbury Head, England
- Land's End, Cornwall, England
- Mull of Kintyre, Scotland
- North Cape, Norway, the northern tip of mainland Europe
- Pointe du Raz, France
- St Bees Head, UK, the most westerly point of northern England

=== North America ===
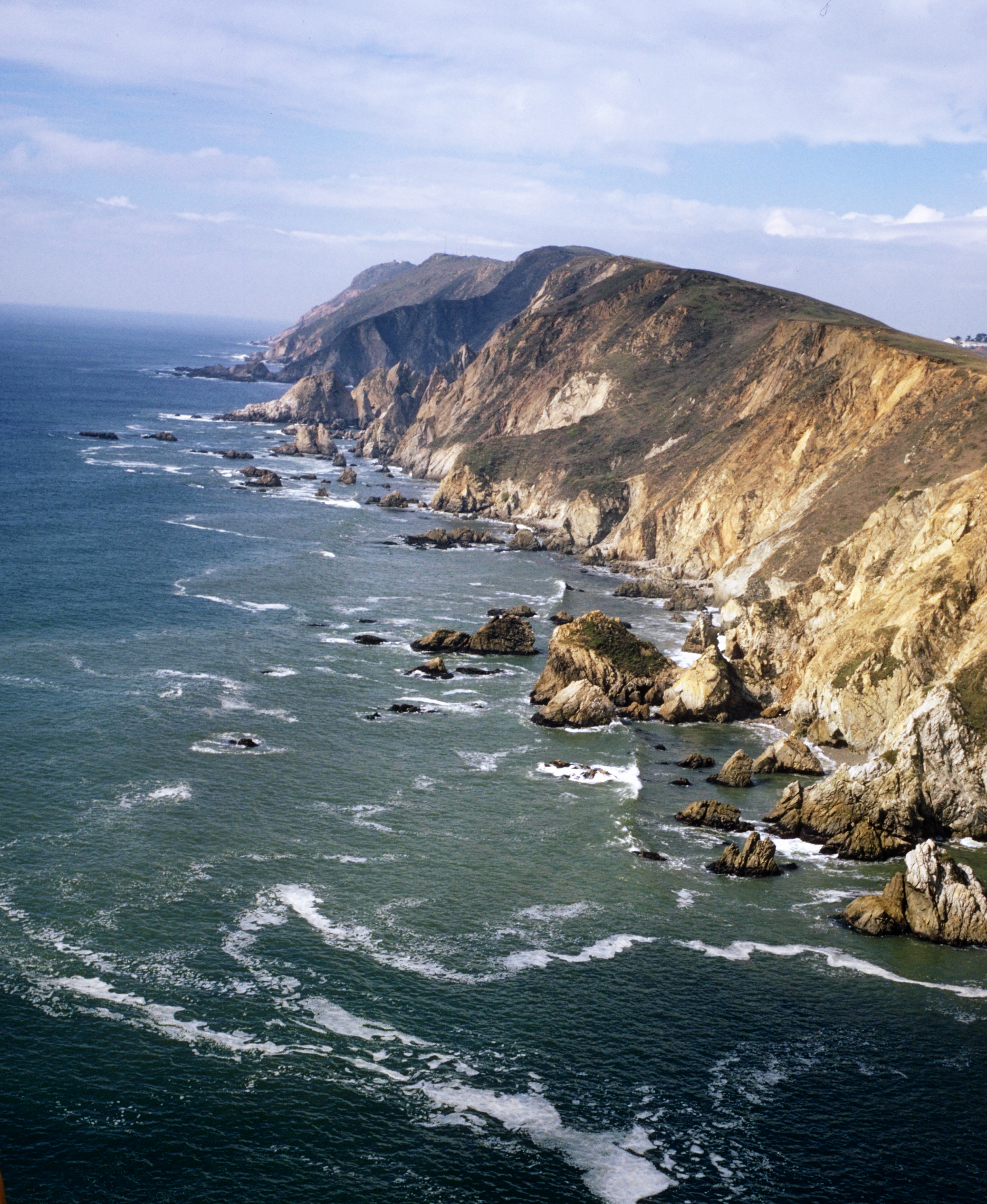
Point Reyes, California, USA

==== Canada ====
- Cape Chidley, Newfoundland and Labrador/Nunavut
- Cape Columbia, Nunavut, Canada's northernmost point
- Cape Freels, Newfoundland and Labrador
- Cape Norman, Newfoundland and Labrador
- Cape Spear, Newfoundland and Labrador, Canada's easternmost point
- Cape Tormentine, New Brunswick
- Fortune Head, Newfoundland and Labrador
- Leslie Street Spit, Toronto, Ontario - man made landform

==== Greenland ====
- Cape Farewell, Greenland's southernmost point
- Cape Morris Jesup, Greenland's northernmost point

==== Mexico ====
- Cabo San Lucas, Baja California Sur, Mexico

==== United States ====
- Cape Ann, Massachusetts
- Cape Canaveral, Florida
- Cape Charles, Virginia
- Cape Cod, Massachusetts
- Cape Disappointment, Washington
- Cape Fear, North Carolina
- Cape Flattery, Washington
- Cape Hatteras, North Carolina
- Cape Henlopen, Delaware
- Cape Henry, Virginia
- Cape May, New Jersey
- Cape Mendocino, California
- Cape Prince of Wales, Alaska
- Cascade Head, Oregon
- Heceta Head, Oregon
- Hilton Head, South Carolina
- Marin Headlands, California
- Mount Mitchill, New Jersey
- North Shore, Lake Superior, Minnesota
- Point Grenville, Washington
- Point Reyes, California
- West Quoddy Head, Maine

=== Oceania ===
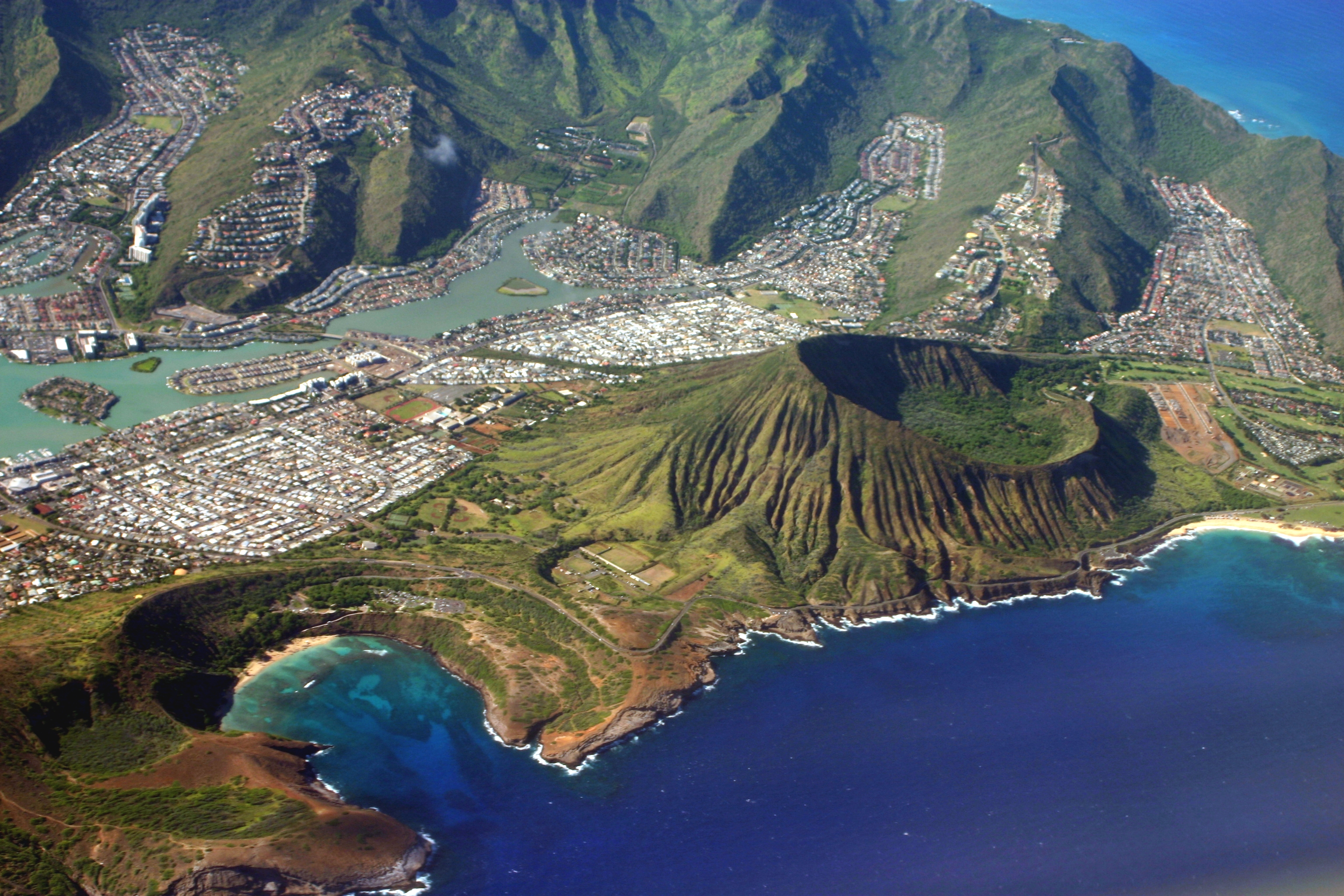
Hanauma Bay and Koko Crater at Koko Head, O'ahu Island, Hawai'i, USA

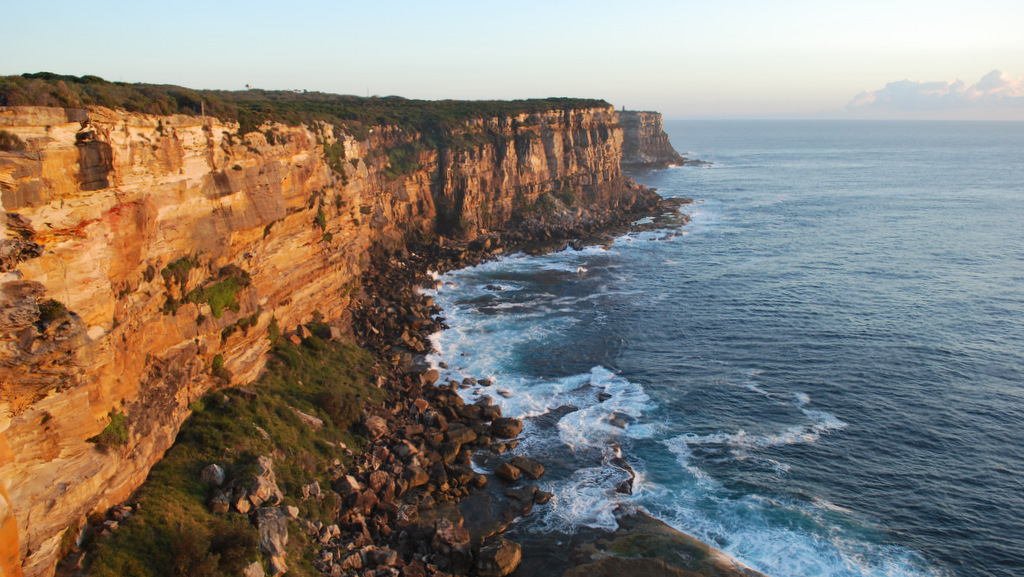
Sydney Heads, New South Wales, Australia

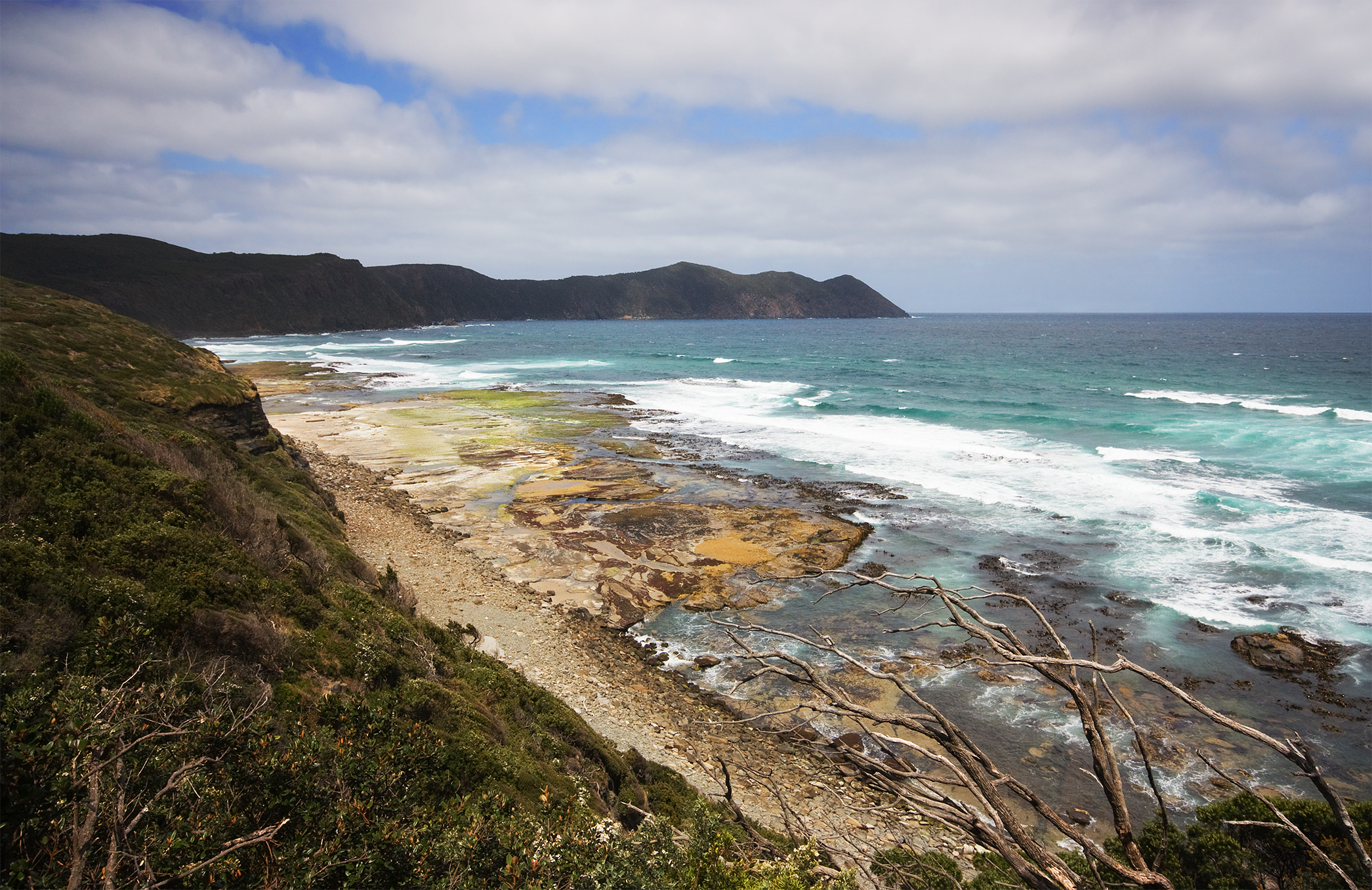
South West Cape, Tasmania

==== Australia ====
- Cape Byron, New South Wales
- Cape Leeuwin, Western Australia
- Cape York Peninsula, Queensland
- South East Cape, Tasmania
- South West Cape, Tasmania
- Steep Point, Western Australia
- Sydney Heads, New South Wales
- Barrenjoey, New South Wales

==== New Zealand ====
- Cape Egmont
- Cape Foulwind
- Cape Reinga
- East Cape
- North Cape
- Young Nick's Head

==== United States (Hawaii) ====
- Diamond Head, Hawaii
- Koko Head, Hawaii

=== South America ===
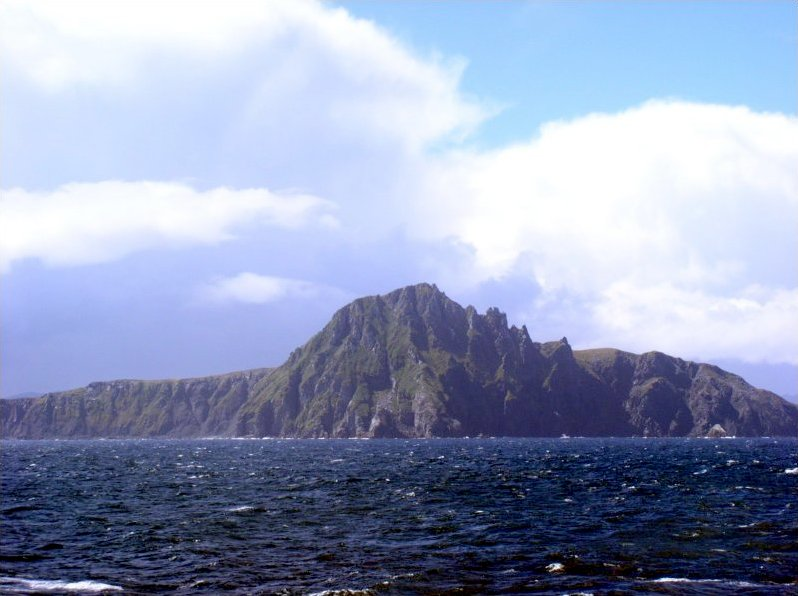
Cape Horn, Chile

- Cape Froward, Chile
- Cape Horn, Chile, South America's southernmost point
- Cape Virgenes, Argentina

== See also ==
- Cape (geography)
- Headland-bay beach
