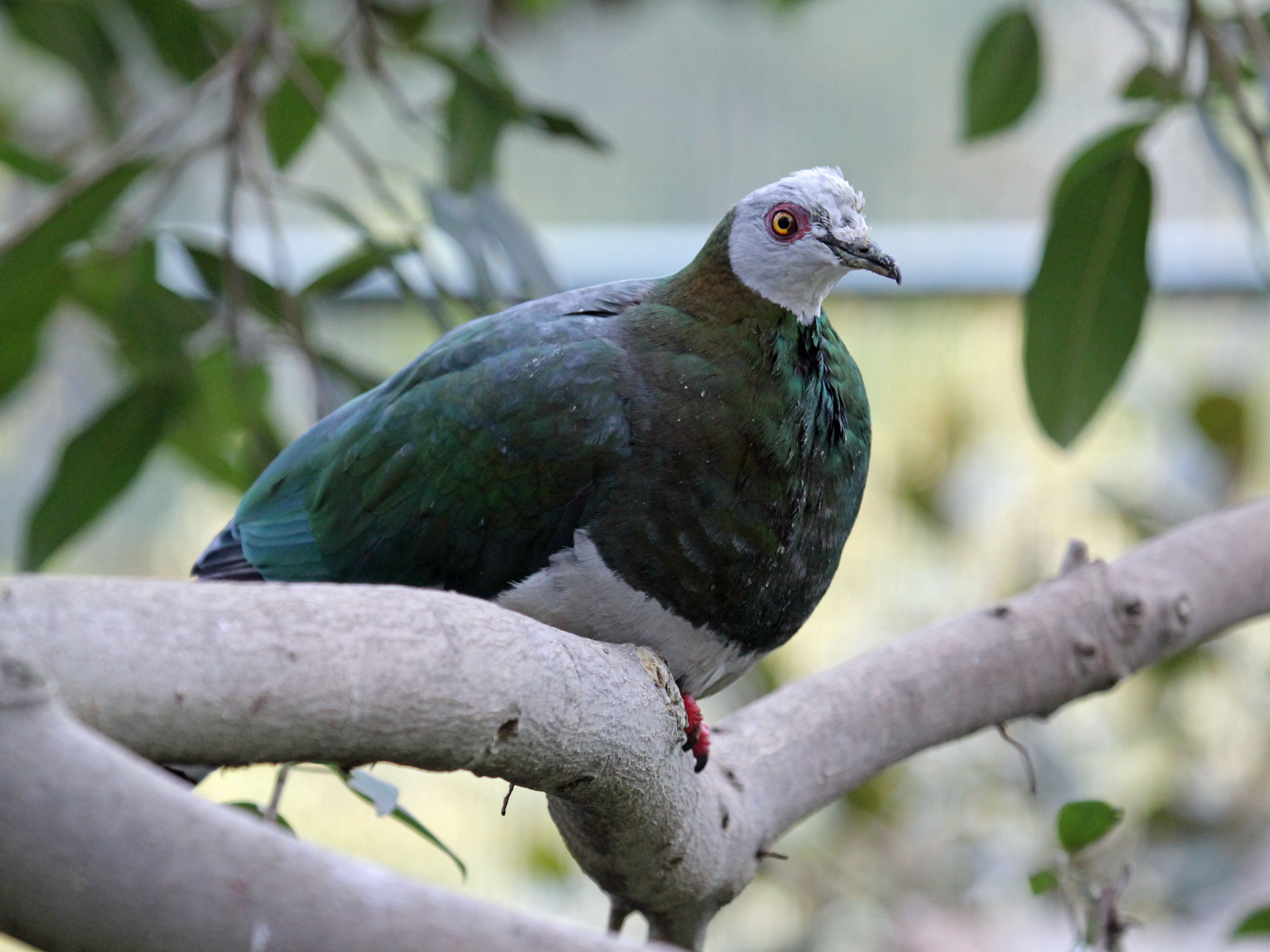
- At San Diego Zoo

Conservation status
- Least Concern (IUCN 3.1)

Scientific classification
- Kingdom: Animalia
- Phylum: Chordata
- Class: Aves
- Order: Columbiformes
- Family: Columbidae
- Genus: Ducula
- Species: D. forsteni

Binomial name
- Ducula forsteni (Bonaparte, 1854)

Synonyms
- Hemiphaga forsteni Bonaparte, 1854; Columba forstenii Prévost, 1826

= White-bellied imperial pigeon =

Species of bird from Indonesia

The white-bellied imperial pigeon (Ducula forsteni) is a species of bird in the pigeon family Columbidae. First described by the French ornithologist Charles Lucien Bonaparte in 1854, it is endemic to Indonesia, where it is found on Sulawesi, Buton, Taliabu, Togian, and Peleng. It inhabits primary forest, dense secondary forest, and isolated areas of hill forest. A large pigeon with a long tail, it measures 42.5–51.5 cm (16.7–20.3 in) long and weighs 510 g (18 oz) on average. Males are mainly green, with pale-grey heads and bellies, chestnut vents, and a pale grey tail band, along with a red orbital ring. Females are nearly identical, but have darker grey areas in their plumage.

The white-bellied imperial pigeon feeds on fruit. It is listed as being of least concern by the International Union for Conservation of Nature (IUCN) on the IUCN Red List due to its sufficiently large range and lack of significant population decline. However, its population is declining due to habitat destruction.

== Taxonomy and systematics ==
The first specimens of the white-bellied imperial pigeon were collected in May 1840 by the Dutch naturalist Eltio Alegondas Forsten from near Lake Tondano in northern Sulawesi. He recognised these specimens are representing a new species and called them Columba taeniura. Specimens of the white-bellied imperial pigeon sold to the taxidermist Benjamin Leadbeater were eventually bought by the Dutch zoologist Coenraad Temminck, who decided to formally describe the new species in the second volume of Les Pigeons by Florent Prévost and Pauline Knip. Instead of naming it Columba taeniura, Temminck decided to name it after Forsten. However, the name of the species' discoverer was erroneously altered while communicating this to Prévost and Knip, and they consequently named it Columba Forsterii, believing it to be named after a "Mr. Forster". The French ornithologist Charles Lucien Bonaparte recognised this error and published a corrected name in 1854, calling the species Hemiphaga forsteni.

Although the name Columba forsterii is an error, misspellings can only be corrected under the International Code of Zoological Nomenclature, which regulates the modification of scientific names, if the original spelling is a clear "slip of the pen" or if external evidence indicates that the author thought the published name was wrong. As both of these conditions were not met, Bonaparte's emendation of Prévost's name was unjustified and his name would normally be a junior synonym for forsterii. However, the French zoologist Anselme Gaëtan Desmarest had called the purple-capped fruit dove (now known as Ptilinopus porphyraceus) Columba forsteri in 1826, making the name Columba forsterii a junior homonym. As Prévost's name is thus invalid, Bonaparte's name, being the earliest valid published name referring to this species, is the correct one.

The white-bellied imperial pigeon was moved to the now-defunct genus Carpophaga in 1856 by the British zoologist George Robert Gray. Carpophaga was later lumped with Ducula. The generic name Ducula is from dukul, the Nepali name for imperial pigeons. The specific name forsteni is in honour of Eltio Forsten, a Dutch zoologist and collector who worked in the East Indies. White-bellied imperial pigeon is the official common name designated by the International Ornithologists' Union. Other common names for the species include Celebes imperial pigeon, emerald imperial pigeon, Forster's imperial pigeon, green-and-white zone-tailed pigeon, green-and-white imperial pigeon, white-bellied imperial pigeon, Celebes zone-tailed imperial pigeon, and Celebes large zone-tailed pigeon.

The white-bellied imperial pigeon is one of 41 species in the imperial pigeon genus Ducula, members of which are found from southern Asia to New Guinea, Australia, and the Pacific Islands. The species is closely related to the pink-bellied imperial pigeon, with which it is occasionally considered conspecific. These two species form a species group with the Mindoro and grey-headed imperial pigeons. All four of these species have sometimes been split into their own genus, Zonophaps. This group may also form a link between the imperial pigeons and the Ptilinopus fruit doves. It is currently monotypic, but the population on the Sula Islands may be a distinct subspecies.

== Description ==
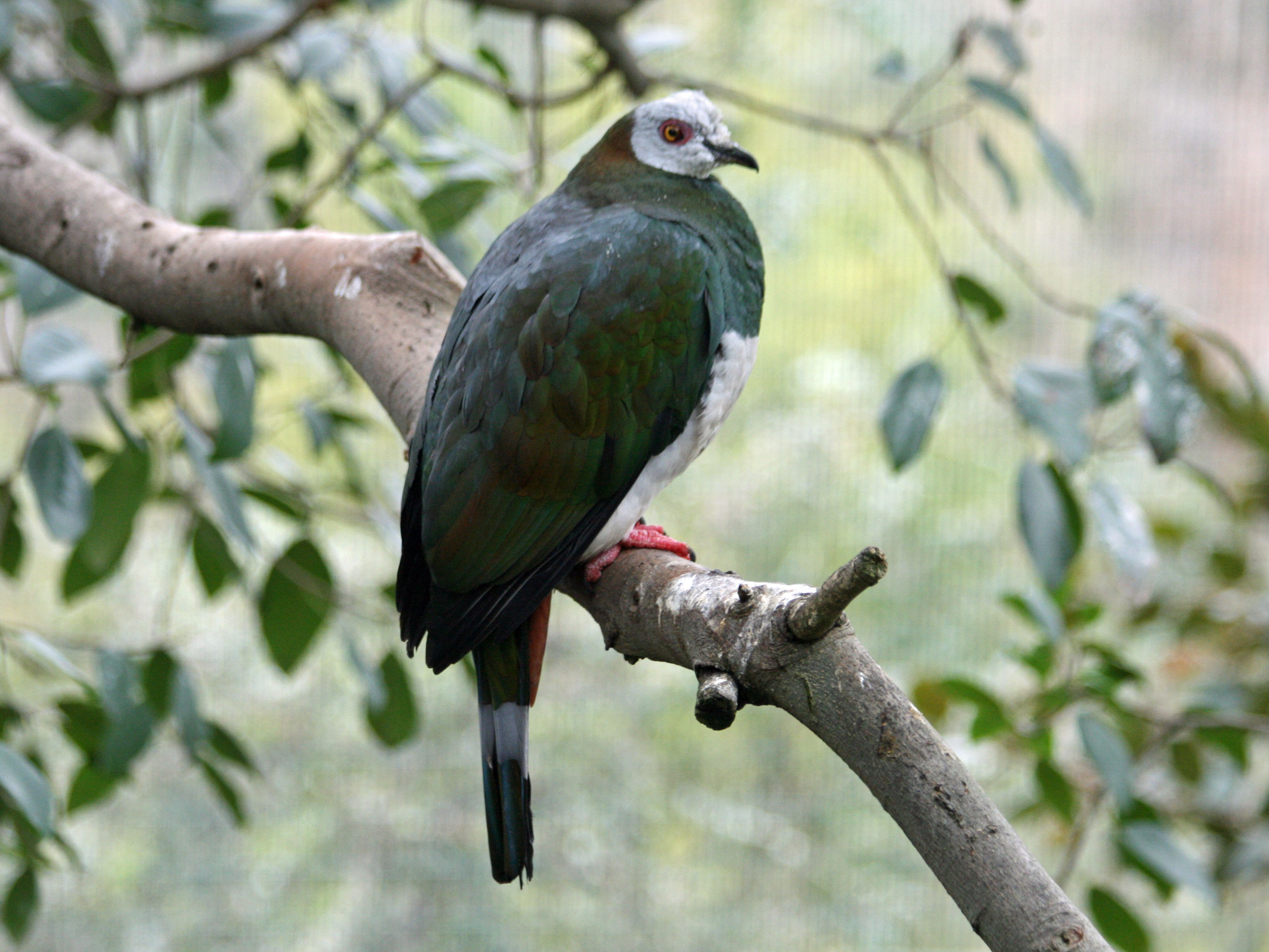
Showing tail band

The white-bellied imperial pigeon is a very large, boldly marked pigeon with a long tail, measuring 42.5–51.5 cm (16.7–20.3 in) long and weighing 510 g (18 oz) on average. Its upperparts and breast are mainly dark green, with bronze-red glossing, especially on the mantle. The head is pale grey, becoming white on the forehead and throat, while the breast and belly are white with a pink or cream tinge. The undertail coverts are dark chestnut, while the outside of the tail has a pale grey band across the centre. The iris is yellow or orange with a darker red or orange orbital ring. Its bill is black, with feathering on the top of the cere, and the feet are purplish. Females are nearly identical to males, but have darker grey in the plumage.

The white-bellied imperial pigeon may be confused with the grey-headed imperial pigeon, but the latter species is smaller, has a narrower and darker tail band, and more uniform grey upperparts and head. It also lacks green on the breast and white on the belly, along with having greenish instead of red orbital skin. The green imperial pigeon may also be confused with the white-bellied imperial pigeon, but has wine-grey head, neck, breast and abdomen, chestnut on the nape, and lacks a tail band.

=== Vocalisations ===
The white-bellied imperial pigeon's advertising call is a short, low-pitched whuu-whooo....whuu-whooo. Both notes are 0.2–0.3 seconds long, and the second is lower-pitched and more emphasized than the first. A three-note variation has also been recorded, in which the third note is the same as the second note. It mainly vocalises before dawn and after mid-day.

== Distribution and habitat ==
The white-bellied imperial pigeon is endemic to Indonesia, where it is found on Sulawasi, Buton, Taliabu, Togian, and Peleng. It inhabits primary forest and dense secondary forest in mountains or along the coast, along with isolated areas of hill forest. It is found at elevations of 150–2,200 m (490–7,220 ft), but is most common at elevations of 800–1,600 m (2,600–5,200 ft).

== Behaviour and ecology ==
The white-bellied imperial pigeon is mostly seen singly or in pairs, but also in small flocks near fruit trees. It is most easily seen while flying over the canopy, high in tall trees, or in smaller trees along forest edges. Its flight is heavy, with deep and slow wingbeats.

=== Diet ===
The white-bellied imperial pigeon feeds exclusively on fruit. Flocks of up to 30 birds can form at fruiting trees, especially figs.

== Status ==
The white-bellied imperial pigeon is listed as being of least concern by the International Union for Conservation of Nature (IUCN) on the IUCN Red List due to its sufficiently large range and lack of significant population decline. However, its population is thought to be declining due to habitat loss. It is moderately common overall on Sulawesi, being locally common in some areas, and uncommon on Taliabu.
