= Neptosternus arnecornelii =

Scientific classification
- Kingdom: Animalia
- Phylum: Arthropoda
- Class: Insecta
- Order: Coleoptera
- Suborder: Adephaga
- Family: Dytiscidae
- Subfamily: Laccophilinae
- Tribe: Laccophilini
- Genus: Neptosternus
- Species: N. arnecornelii

Binomial name
- Neptosternus arnecornelii Hendrich & Balke, 2003

Species of beetle

Neptosternus arnecornelii is a species of beetle, named after Arne Cornelius. Its holotype was found in West Kalimantan, Indonesia. The specimens were captured floating on tree roots in a rocky mountain stream near a forest. Neptosternus arnecornelii superficially resembles N. biltoni (Hendric & Balk, 1997) from the Togian Islands northeast of Sulawesi. It is a small, broadly ovate species; with its body strongly flattened laterally.

== Description ==
Its length is between 2.63 and 2.70 millimetres (0.104 and 0.106 in), while its maximum breadth is between 1.43 and 1.45 millimetres (0.056 and 0.057 in). Colour: upper side comparatively light; head ferrugineous; pronotum dark, ferrugineous medially; elytron black with two small and two bright yellow patches. Venter yellowish to brown, epipleuron ferrugineous and appendages yellowish to ferrugineous. Its head is covered with polygonal meshes. Its pronotum shows microreticulation of polygonal meshes along its anterior margin, while its elytron shows microreticulation consisting of slightly transversely oriented polygonal meshes. Some large punctures are visible discally near the suture and its discal row of serial punctures. This discal row of small punctures almost forms a shallow stria, while its 1st and 2nd lateral rows are less distinct.
