= Neptosternus sinharajaicus =

Scientific classification
- Domain: Eukaryota
- Kingdom: Animalia
- Phylum: Arthropoda
- Class: Insecta
- Order: Coleoptera
- Suborder: Adephaga
- Family: Dytiscidae
- Subfamily: Laccophilinae
- Tribe: Laccophilini
- Genus: Neptosternus
- Species: N. sinharajaicus

Binomial name
- Neptosternus sinharajaicus Holmen & Vazirani, 1990

Species of beetle

Neptosternus sinharajaicus is a species of beetle.
