= Neptosternus starmuehlneri =

Scientific classification
- Kingdom: Animalia
- Phylum: Arthropoda
- Class: Insecta
- Order: Coleoptera
- Suborder: Adephaga
- Family: Dytiscidae
- Subfamily: Laccophilinae
- Tribe: Laccophilini
- Genus: Neptosternus
- Species: N. starmuehlneri

Binomial name
- Neptosternus starmuehlneri Wewalka, 1973

Species of beetle

Neptosternus starmuehlneri, is a species of predaceous diving beetle found in Sri Lanka.

== Description ==
This species has a typical length of about 3.5 to 3.7 mm.
