= Japanolaccophilus =

Scientific classification
- Domain: Eukaryota
- Kingdom: Animalia
- Phylum: Arthropoda
- Class: Insecta
- Order: Coleoptera
- Suborder: Adephaga
- Family: Dytiscidae
- Subfamily: Laccophilinae
- Tribe: Laccophilini
- Genus: Japanolaccophilus; Satô, 1972

Genus of beetles

Japanolaccophilus is a genus of predaceous diving beetles in the family Dytiscidae. There are at least two described species in Japanolaccophilus, one alive today and the other extinct.

== Species ==
These two species belong to the genus Japanolaccophilus:

- Japanolaccophilus niponensis (Kamiya, 1939) (Japan and southern Asia)
- †Japanolaccophilus beatificus Balke & Hendrich, 2019 (found in Baltic amber)
