= Neptosternus ceylonicus =

Scientific classification
- Domain: Eukaryota
- Kingdom: Animalia
- Phylum: Arthropoda
- Class: Insecta
- Order: Coleoptera
- Suborder: Adephaga
- Family: Dytiscidae
- Subfamily: Laccophilinae
- Tribe: Laccophilini
- Genus: Neptosternus
- Species: N. ceylonicus

Binomial name
- Neptosternus ceylonicus Holmen & Vazirani, 1990

Species of beetle

Neptosternus ceylonicus is a species of beetle. Its holotype was found in Sri Lanka. The specimens were captured in running water or when flying towards light in the evening.

== Description ==
This species resembles other smaller or medium-sized species of Neptosternus. It may be recognized by the size, fairly widely oval shape of its body, the colour-patterns of pronotum and elytra, and the shape of the penis in the males. Its length is between 2.8 and 3.0 millimetres (0.11 and 0.12 in), while its breadth is between 1.5 and 1.6 millimetres (0.059 and 0.063 in). It shape is elongate and oval, moderately convex dorsally; and its upper surface shining. Its head and antennae are yellowish in colour, with fine and remote punctation on the head. It also has a reticulate surface. The pronotum is yellowish with a narrow transverse slightly darker band in the middle, and an anterior submarginal row of punctures that are irregular.
