= Togean Island =

Indonesian island in the Gulf of Tomini, part of Togean Archipelago

Togean

Geography
- Coordinates: 0°23′30″S 121°57′28″E
- Area: 237 km^{2} (92 sq mi) (Note: Area of Togean District plus Tanjung Pude Village (Una Una). Also includes smaller islets surrounding the island.)

Administration
- Indonesia
- Province: Central Sulawesi
- Regency: Tojo Una-Una

Demographics
- Population: 10,889 (2021)
- Pop. density: 43.3/km^{2} (112.1/sq mi)

Togean (sometimes spelled Togian) is an Indonesian island in the Gulf of Tomini, part of the Togean Archipelago. It is administratively part of the Tojo Una-Una Regency of Central Sulawesi, consisting largely of the Togean District with the Tanjung Pude village, part of the Una Una District, sitting on the western part of the island.

The island, having a population of just over ten thousand, is separated by a small channel with the slightly bigger Batudaka Island, making it the second largest island in the archipelago. It lies within the Togean Islands National Park, which holds the largest amount of preserved coral reefs by area in the country.

== Geography ==
The island has an area of about 237 square kilometers, making it the second-largest island in the archipelago.

Togean and the other islands in the archipelago were formed by volcanic activity. It is separated from the islands of Batudaka to its southwest and Talatako to its east by narrow channels, which are believed to have originated from ancient riverbeds scoured by recent currents.

Geology of the island varies, with reefal limestones in the extreme northwest, followed by sedimentary sandstones, extrusive volcaniclastic rocks and intrusive rocks further east.

== Economy ==
In order to accommodate tourists visiting the nautical national park, there are 8 hotels on the island. In addition to tourism, agriculture is present on the island with coconuts and cocoa, the two main crops, taking up approximately 1,500 and 1,000 hectares respectively. Neither PLN nor the local government's water authority is present on the island.
