= Una-Una =

Island in Central Sulawesi, Indonesia

Coordinates: 0.1700°S 121.6083°E

Una-Una (Indonesian: Pulau Una-Una) is an Indonesian island, part of the Togian Islands in the Gulf of Tomini.

Una-Una is a small volcanic island created by the Colo volcano. Its vegetation primarily consists of coconut trees. It forms the Una-Una District (kecamatan) within the Tojo Una-Una Regency in the Central Sulawesi Province of Indonesia. Most of the island was devastated by pyroclastic flows following an eruption of the volcano in 1983. It covers a land area of 146.16 km^{2} and had 8,395 inhabitants living in 11 villages (desa) in mid 2024.

Una-Una is surrounded by thriving reefs home to large schools of fish. It has been known as a location for scuba-diving since the 1990s.

== Gallery ==
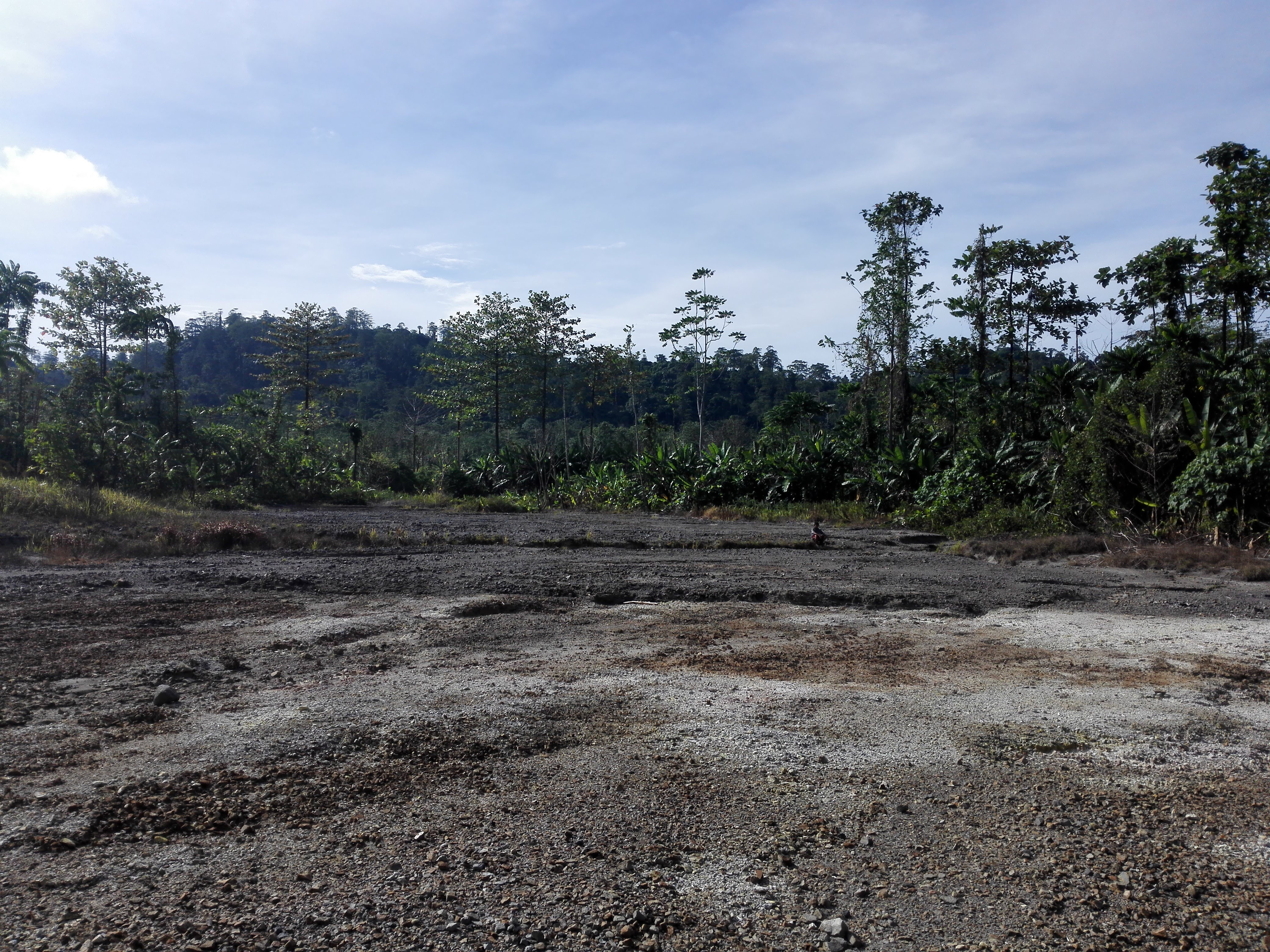
Mount Colo

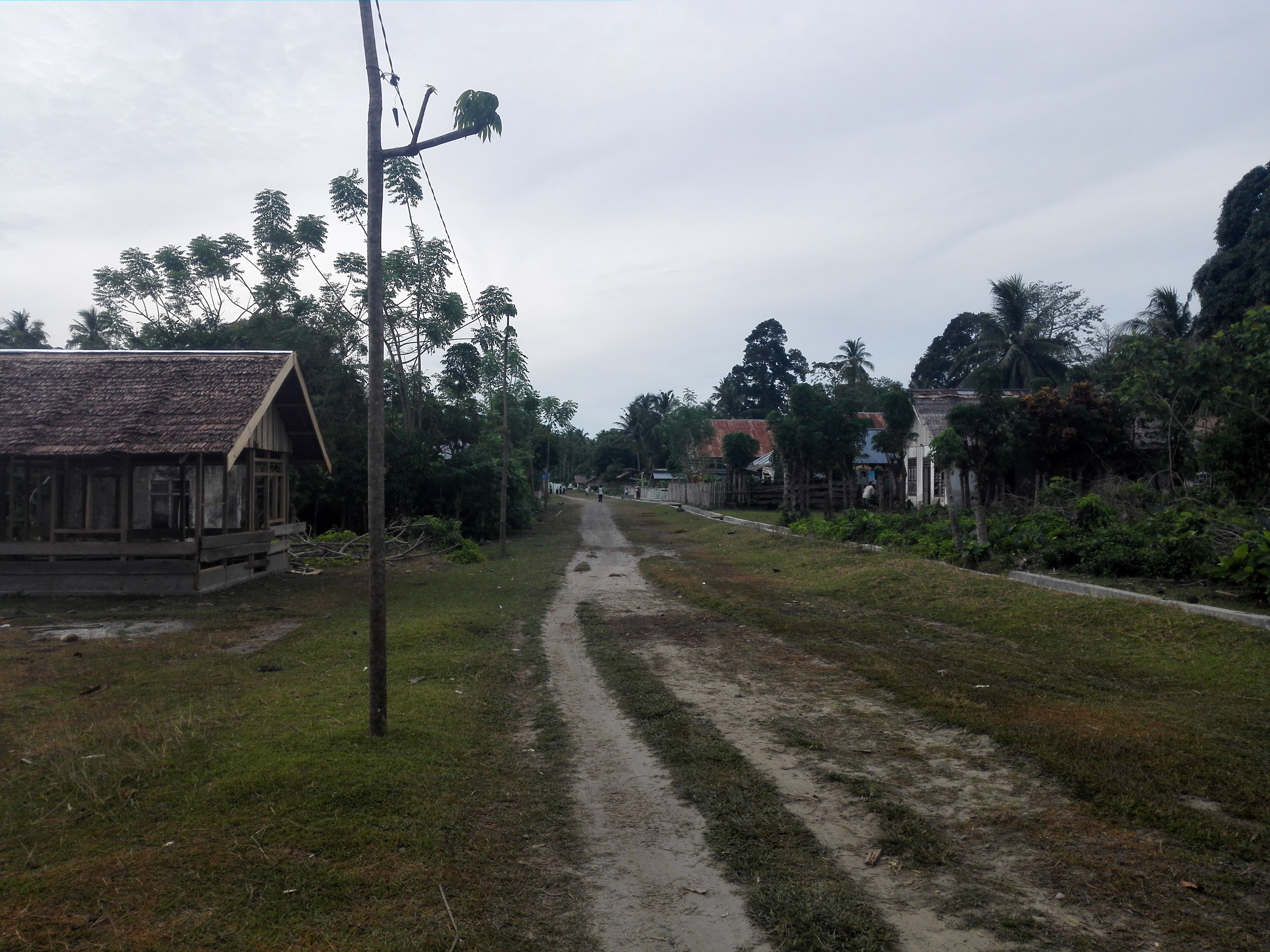
Road next to the school

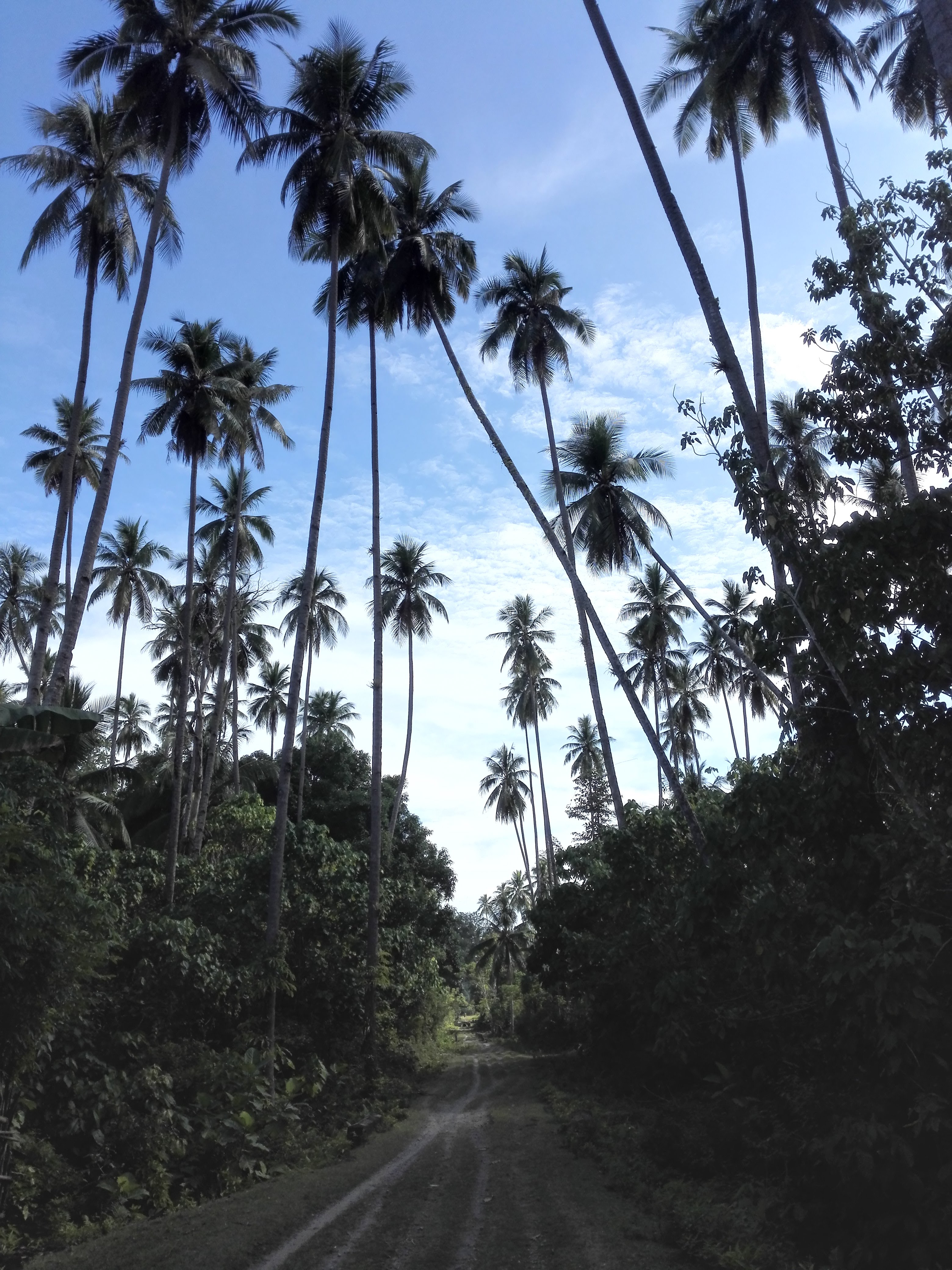
Path with surrounding coconut trees

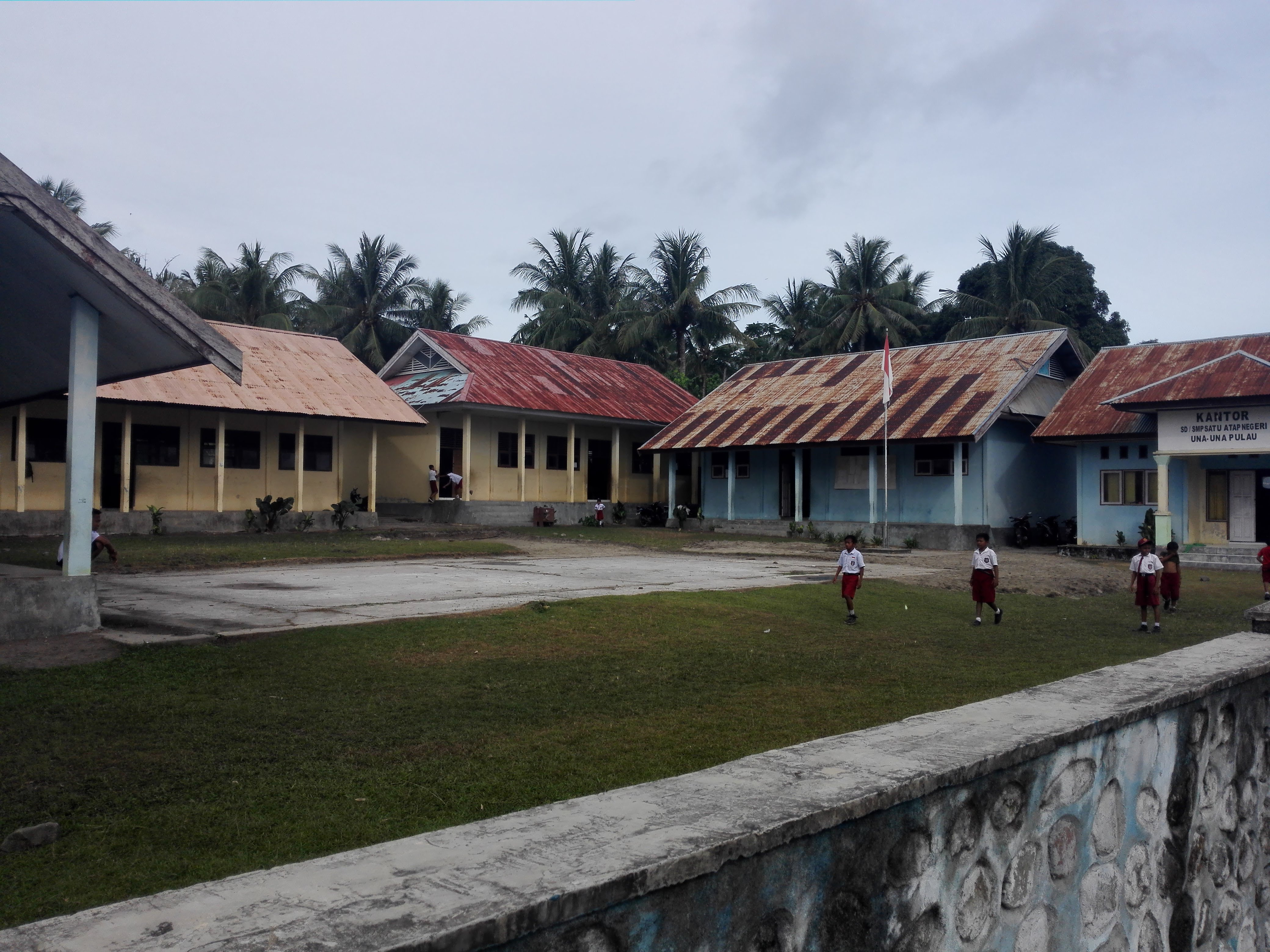
Elementary school

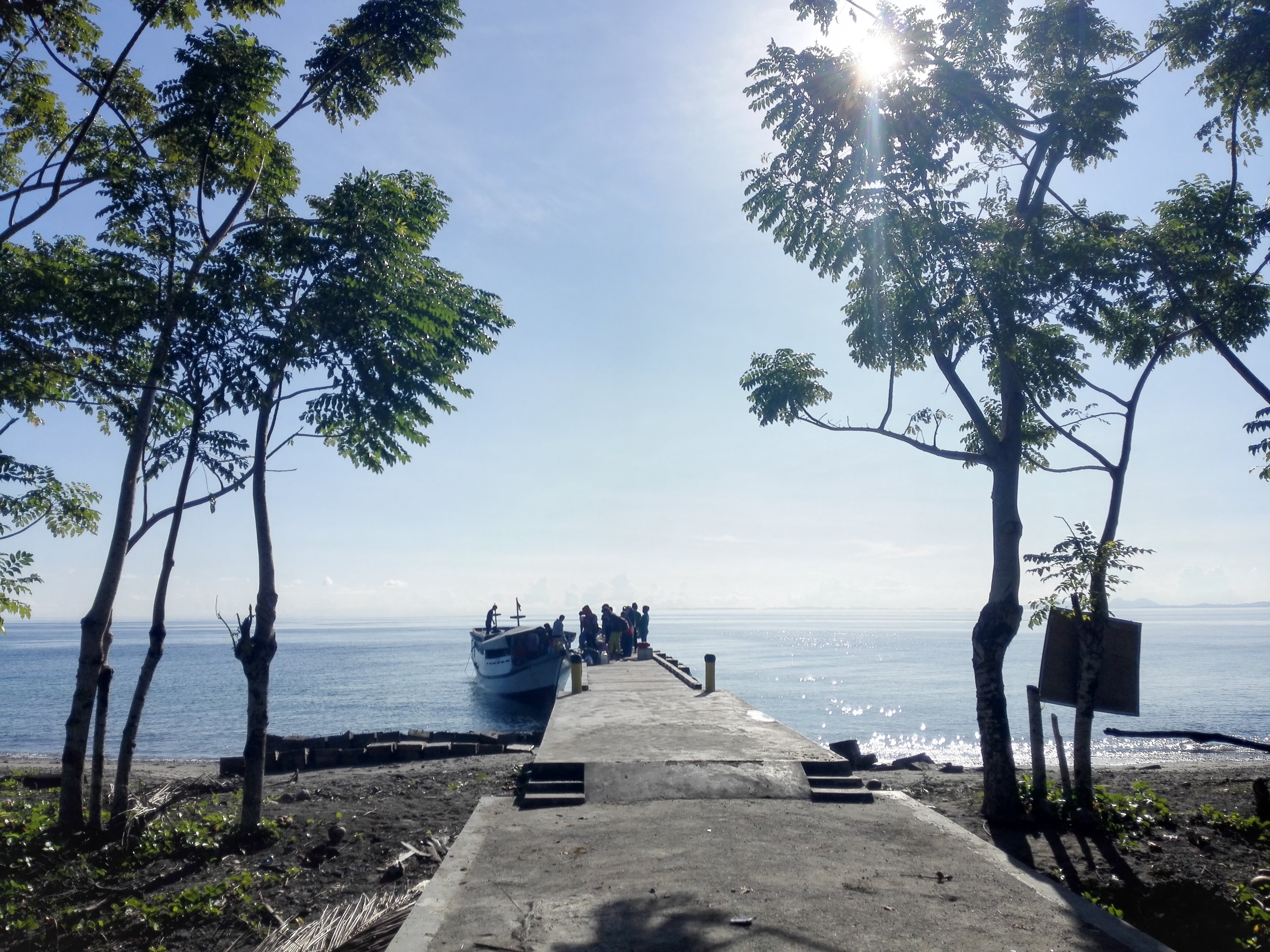
Port

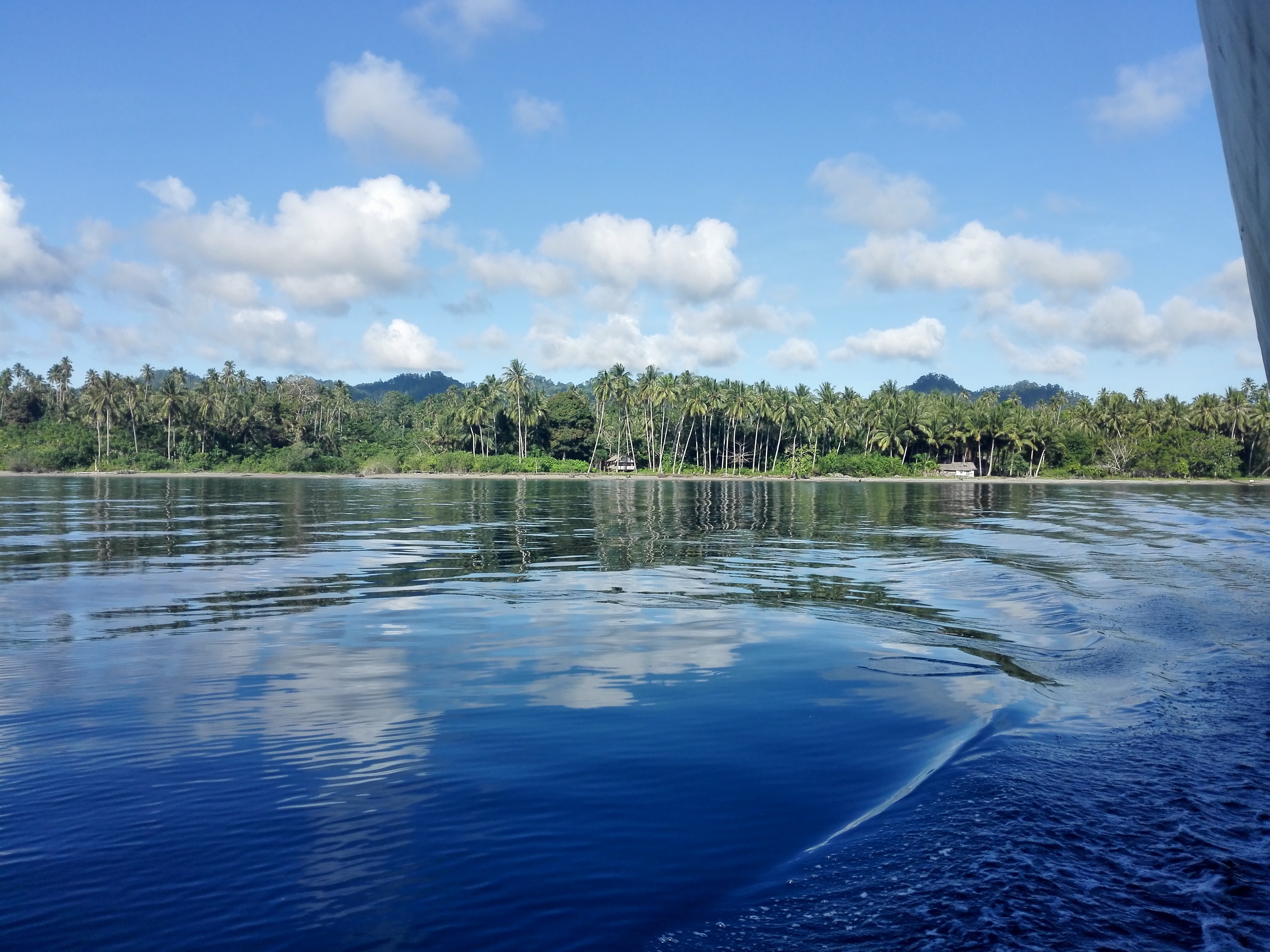
View from the boat
