= Neptosternus taprobanicus =

Scientific classification
- Kingdom: Animalia
- Phylum: Arthropoda
- Class: Insecta
- Order: Coleoptera
- Suborder: Adephaga
- Family: Dytiscidae
- Subfamily: Laccophilinae
- Tribe: Laccophilini
- Genus: Neptosternus
- Species: N. taprobanicus

Binomial name
- Neptosternus taprobanicus Sharp, 1890

Species of beetle

Neptosternus taprobanicus, is a species of predaceous diving beetle found in Sri Lanka.

== Description ==
This long oval beetle has a body size of about 3 mm.
