= Kepulauan Togean National Park =

National park in Indonesia

- IUCN category II (national park)
- Location within Sulawesi
- Location: Sulawesi, Indonesia
- Nearest city: Ampana
- Coordinates: 0°21′S 121°59′E
- Area: 3,626 km^{2} (1,400 sq mi)
- Established: 2004
- Governing body: Ministry of Forestry of Indonesia

Kepulauan Togean National Park is a largely marine national park, including the Togian Islands, near Sulawesi island of Indonesia.

The Kepulauan Togean Islands are an archipelago located in the transition zone of the Wallace and Weber lines and are a group of small islands that cross in the middle of the Gulf of Tomini.

KTNP area is located administratively in Tojo Una-Una regency, Central Sulawesi province, extending about 102.7 km from west to east line. It has become part of the Tojo Una-Una Togean Biosphere Reserve based on the 31st International Co-ordinating Council of the Man and Biosphere Program on 19 June 2019 in Paris, France.

UNESCO designated the Togean Tojo Una-Una Biosphere Reserve as the 15th Biosphere Reserve in Indonesia and is situated in the heart of the world’s coral reef triangle, which has the greatest diversity of coral species. The biosphere reserve is home to approximately 149,214 people, the vast majority of whom are locals (fisherman) in the transition area in the city of Ampana’s main settlements.

The flora in the core region of the Togean Tojo Una-Una Biosphere Reserve area is divided into two categories: terrestrial and aquatic floras. Lowland forest covers a portion of the Togean Islands’ terrestrial area. About 363 of flora species have been recorded in Togean Islands. Togean Island’s flora includes palapi (Heritiera javanica), ironwood (Intsia bijuga), siuri/ranggu (Koordersiodendron pinnatum), uru (Magnolia vrieseana), flakes (Elmerrillia sp.), and other Dipterocarpaceae species such as Shorea sp., Dipterocarpus sp., and Hopea sp. Also found in KTNP are soap tree (Alphitonia excelsa), Cananga tree (Cananga odorata), kadam (Anthocephalus chinensis), Jackapple (Alstonia spectabilis), Mallotus sp., Macaranga sp., Yellow cheesewood (Nauclea orientalis), and Crima/Bintuang (Octomeles sumatrana).

There are 33 species of aquatic flora in KTNP, including mangroves (Rhizophora spp.), api-api (Avicennia spp.), Ceriops spp and Exoecaria sp Asiatic mangrove (Rhizophora mucronata), perepat (Sonneratia alba), api-api hitam (Avicennia alba), Scyphiphora sp., Phempis sp., ketapang (Terminalia catappa), thatch screwpine (Pandanus tecrorius), and sea hibiscus (Hibiscus tiliaceus). Rhizopora mucronataspecies was the most dominant species found at various levels of vegetation. While other species of aquatic flora were found in 7 species of seagrass, including Turtle grass (Thallasia hemprichii) and Enhalus acoroides are the dominant, paddle weed (Halophila ovalis), Halodule uninervis, Cymodocea rortundata, Syringodium isotifolium and Caulerpa serrulata.
