= Mount Colo =

Stratovolcano in Indonesia

Colo
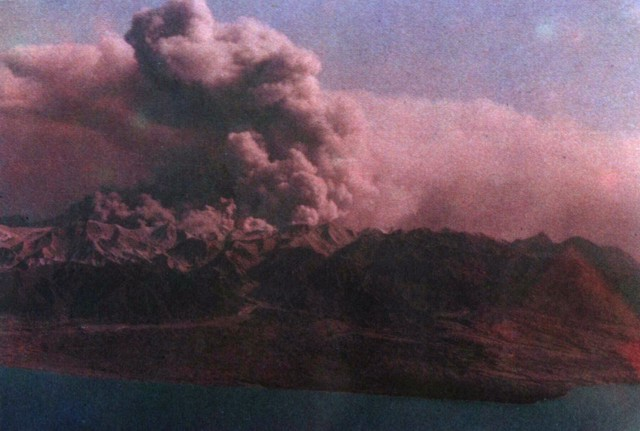
- A broad ash plume rises above Colo volcano during the 1983 eruption

Highest point
- Elevation: 507 m (1,663 ft)
- Coordinates: 0°10′12″S 121°36′29″E

Geography
- Location within Sulawesi
- Location: Sulawesi, Indonesia

Geology
- Mountain type: Stratovolcano with caldera
- Rock type(s): Trachyandesite, Basaltic Trachyandesite, Trachyte, Trachydacite
- Last eruption: July to December 1983

Colo is a stratovolcano in Indonesia. It forms the island of Una-Una at the middle of the Gulf of Tomini, the northern part of Sulawesi. The volcano is broad and has a low profile with only 507 metres (1,663 ft) above the sea level. It contains a 2 kilometres (1.2 mi) wide caldera with a small volcanic cone inside. Three eruptions have been recorded, with two of them causing damage.

== 1898 eruption ==
The eruption had a Volcanic Explosivity Index (VEI) of 3, qualifying as 'severe'. It involved a central vent eruption, and produced Lahars. The island was evacuated, and there was damage to property.

== 1983 eruption ==
This eruption was more violent and had a VEI of 4. It involved pyroclastic flows and phreatic explosions. The island was evacuated, and there was damage to property, but there were no deaths.

== See also ==
- List of volcanoes in Indonesia
