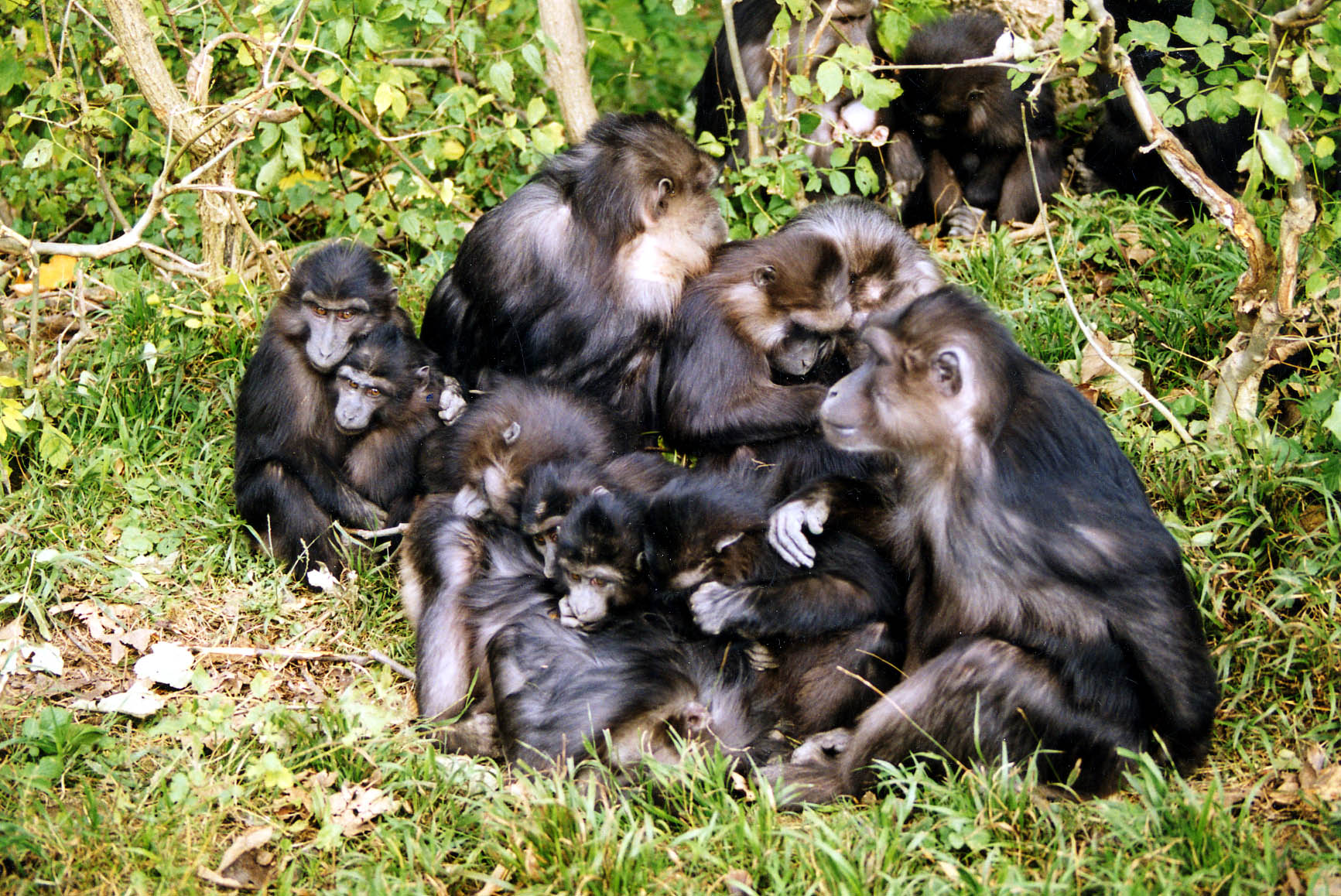

Conservation status
- Vulnerable (IUCN 3.1)

Scientific classification
- Kingdom: Animalia
- Phylum: Chordata
- Class: Mammalia
- Infraclass: Placentalia
- Order: Primates
- Family: Cercopithecidae
- Genus: Macaca
- Species: M. tonkeana

Binomial name
- Macaca tonkeana (Meyer, 1899)
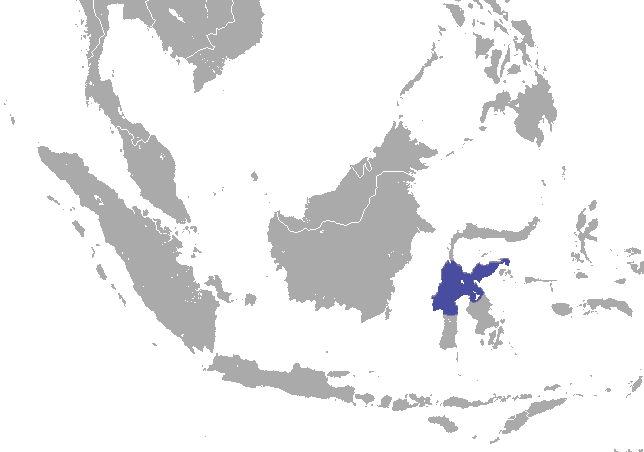
- Tonkean macaque range (also found on the nearby Togian Islands, not marked on this map)

= Tonkean macaque =

Tonkean black macaque

Species of Old World monkey

The Tonkean black macaque or Tonkean macaque (Macaca tonkeana) is a species of primate in the family Cercopithecidae. It is endemic to central Sulawesi and the nearby Togian Islands in Indonesia. It is threatened by habitat loss. Widespread mining in central Sulawesi is believed to exacerbating the problems of habitat loss.

Tonkean macaques have an ape-like appearance, with males being slightly larger than females. A handful of matriarchs enforce a relatively lenient, though stable, pecking order. These macaques take significant effort in maintaining harmony within the group and practice conflict resolution to a great degree. However, this peacefulness does not extend to outside troops. If two tonkean macaque troops cross paths, intense conflicts can arise.

== Behavior ==
=== Communication ===
Studies show that male macaques often interacted with each other through facial displays and physical contact. High ranking males typically started these interactions. These macaques usually interacted with those that were physically close to them most often. They use contact calls to communicate with each other able social events, and loudness depends on context and distance of the individual. Loud calls are used amongst members of the same social groups to inform other members of position and activity. Most calls are from males to other males in the same group. There may be differences among groups caused by certain conditions such as size, ecology, and sex.

=== Social systems ===
As like other macaque species, the Tonkean macaque group structure is matrilineal. They live is multimale-multifemale groups. The size of their groups are generally around 10-30 individuals.

Tonkean macaques have been known to subgroup, which is when individuals of the group split up to do certain activities such as forage and feed. Their social system has been shown to be relatively relaxed since in these groups there is no interdiction of members interacting with others such as higher-ranking members. The dominance hierarchy remains relatively stable over the years.

In aggressive contexts, the individual that flees is considered the loser of the fight, and about 50% of the time, the one that flees is the one that was originally threatened. Females have been seen retaliating against the highest-ranking male by chasing the individual up a tree.

As for non-aggressive behaviors, the use of the silent bared-teeth display is to show that the individual aims to be peaceful. As well, towards high-ranking macaques, individuals will use the lipsmack to communicate with them. Amongst individuals, frequent behaviors consist of clasps, grunts, and lipsmacks. In contexts where an individual intervenes peacefully, males were more likely to do this than females. Generally, this intervention is by done by individuals who were related to one of the individuals involved in the conflict. One study found that using peaceful interventions was twice as effective to stop a conflict than by using aggression. Affinitive behaviors such as grooming were a common occurrence after a peaceful intervention took place.

There are contexts where mothers will use affectionate-looking behavior such as hugging and nibbling to attempt to stop an aggressive conflict caused by her child, although it is not possible to know if this behavior is aggressive. In order to stop a conflict, individuals uninvolved in the conflict have been seen to use the lipsmack to intervene. These peaceful conciliations have been shown to be more effective than using aggression.

=== Diet ===
The Tonkean macaque's diet is composed of mostly fruit, making it frugivorous. Their diet particularly consists of ripe fruit from the Moraceae family.

=== Reproduction ===
On average, females started their menstrual cycle around the ages of 4-5 and the length of their menstrual cycle averaged 37–41 days. As well, their gestation length was approximately 173 days. During ovulation, females present genital swelling.

In one study, dominant males were shown to desire females that were mothers and were fertile and they blocked other potential mates by what is called mate guarding. This male stays by the female for days. Females with no children were then left for the lower-rank males. The male Tonkean macaques that mate guarded were mildly aggressive to the females. This was to stop the females from being able to choose the partner they wanted.

Mature females attracted more males than young females, likely because mature females are more fertile.

=== Parenting ===
In this social system, females have been shown to be allowed by mothers to alloparent their young. As well, mothers have been shown to not restrict their young to connect with others in the group.
