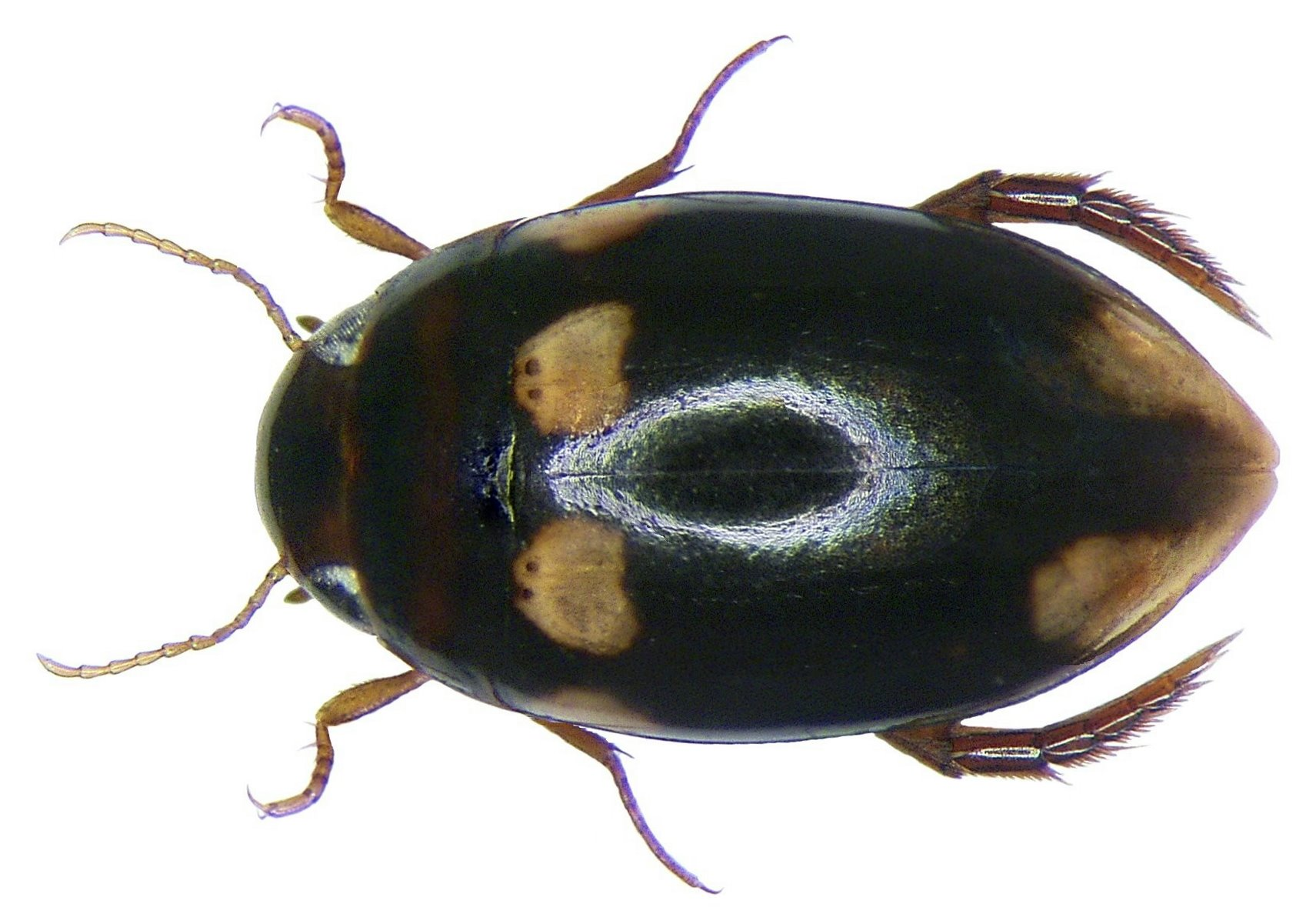
- Neptosternus schoedli

Scientific classification
- Kingdom: Animalia
- Phylum: Arthropoda
- Class: Insecta
- Order: Coleoptera
- Suborder: Adephaga
- Family: Dytiscidae
- Subfamily: Laccophilinae
- Tribe: Laccophilini
- Genus: Neptosternus; Sharp, 1882

= Neptosternus =

Genus of beetles

Neptosternus is a genus of diving beetles in the family Dytiscidae. There are more than 90 described species in Neptosternus, found mainly in Africa and Southern Asia.

== Species ==
These 98 species belong to the genus Neptosternus:

- Neptosternus africanus Peschet, 1917 (Africa)
- Neptosternus alluaudi Régimbart, 1903 (Africa)
- Neptosternus annettae Hendrich & Balke, 2000 (Southern Asia)
- Neptosternus arnecornelii Hendrich & Balke, 2003 (Southern Asia)
- Neptosternus aterrimus Hendrich & Balke, 1997 (Southern Asia)
- Neptosternus babetteae Hendrich & Balke, 1997 (Southern Asia)
- Neptosternus bartolozzii Bilardo & Rocchi, 2012 (Africa)
- Neptosternus batekensis Bilardo & Rocchi, 2010 (Africa)
- Neptosternus bellus Hendrich & Balke, 1997 (Southern Asia)
- Neptosternus biharensis Vazirani, 1963 (Southern Asia)
- Neptosternus biltoni Hendrich & Balke, 1997 (Southern Asia)
- Neptosternus bimaculatus Hendrich & Balke, 1997 (Southern Asia)
- Neptosternus borneensis Hendrich & Balke, 1997 (Southern Asia)
- Neptosternus boukali Hendrich & Balke, 1999 (Southern Asia)
- Neptosternus brevior Régimbart, 1899 (Southern Asia)
- Neptosternus cebuensis Hendrich & Balke, 2000 (Southern Asia)
- Neptosternus ceylonicus Holmen & Vazirani, 1990 (Southern Asia)
- Neptosternus chumphon Balke & Hendrich, 1998 (Southern Asia)
- Neptosternus circumductus Régimbart, 1899 (Southern Asia)
- Neptosternus compsus Guignot, 1953 (Africa)
- Neptosternus coomani Peschet, 1923 (Southern Asia)
- Neptosternus corporaali Zimmermann, 1924 (Southern Asia)
- Neptosternus distinctus Omer-Cooper, 1970 (Africa)
- Neptosternus fasciatus Omer-Cooper, 1970 (Africa)
- Neptosternus feryi Balke, Hendrich & C. M. Yang, 1997 (Southern Asia)
- Neptosternus hafti Hendrich & Balke, 1997 (Southern Asia)
- Neptosternus haibini Peng, Ji, Bian & Hájek, 2018 (Southern Asia)
- Neptosternus hedychrous Guignot, 1955 (Africa)
- Neptosternus horai Vazirani, 1953 (Southern Asia)
- Neptosternus hydaticoides (Régimbart, 1877) (Southern Asia)
- Neptosternus jacobsoni Zimmermann, 1927 (Southern Asia)
- Neptosternus jaechi Hendrich & Balke, 1997 (Southern Asia)
- Neptosternus jani Hendrich & Balke, 1997 (Southern Asia)
- Neptosternus kalimantanensis Hendrich & Balke, 1997 (Southern Asia)
- Neptosternus kaszabi Satô, 1972 (Southern Asia)
- Neptosternus kerala Hendrich & Balke, 1999 (Southern Asia)
- Neptosternus kodadai Hendrich & Balke, 1997 (Southern Asia)
- Neptosternus kolakaensis Balke & Hendrich, 1998 (Southern Asia)
- Neptosternus komareki Bilardo & Rocchi, 2012 (Africa)
- Neptosternus krikkeni Hendrich & Balke, 1997 (Southern Asia)
- Neptosternus langoensis Bilardo & Rocchi, 2010 (Africa)
- Neptosternus latissimus Balke, Hendrich & C. M. Yang, 1997 (Southern Asia)
- Neptosternus leyi Hendrich & Balke, 2000 (Southern Asia)
- Neptosternus longitarsis Bilardo & Rocchi, 2012 (Africa)
- Neptosternus maculatus Hendrich & Balke, 1997 (Southern Asia)
- Neptosternus magnus Hendrich & Balke, 1997 (Southern Asia)
- Neptosternus malayanus Hendrich & Balke, 1997 (Southern Asia)
- Neptosternus maliensis Bilardo & Rocchi, 2012 (Africa)
- Neptosternus manfredi Hendrich & Balke, 1997 (Southern Asia)
- Neptosternus martinae Hendrich & Balke, 2001 (Southern Asia)
- Neptosternus mazzoldii Hendrich & Balke, 1997 (Southern Asia)
- Neptosternus minimus Hendrich & Balke, 1997 (Southern Asia)
- Neptosternus moelleri Hendrich & Balke, 1997 (Southern Asia)
- Neptosternus montalbanensis Hendrich & Balke, 2000 (Southern Asia)
- Neptosternus muluensis Hendrich & Balke, 1997 (Southern Asia)
- Neptosternus namcattienensis Hendrich & Balke, 1997 (Southern Asia)
- Neptosternus neisiorum Hendrich & Balke, 1997 (Southern Asia)
- Neptosternus nigritus Hendrich & Balke, 1997 (Southern Asia)
- Neptosternus noteroides Hendrich & Balke, 1997 (Southern Asia)
- Neptosternus nuperus Guignot, 1954 (Africa)
- Neptosternus oberthueri Régimbart, 1903 (Africa)
- Neptosternus oblongus Régimbart, 1895 (Africa)
- Neptosternus ornatus Sharp, 1882 (Africa)
- Neptosternus pederzanii Bilardo & Rocchi, 2010 (Africa)
- Neptosternus pocsi Satô, 1972 (Southern Asia)
- Neptosternus pseudocorporaali Hendrich & Balke, 1997 (Southern Asia)
- Neptosternus pseudohydaticoides Hendrich & Balke, 1997 (Southern Asia)
- Neptosternus pumicatus Guignot, 1949 (Africa)
- Neptosternus punctatus Zhao, Hájek, Jia & Pang, 2012 (Southern Asia)
- Neptosternus pusillus Bilardo & Rocchi, 2016 (Africa)
- Neptosternus quadrimaculatus Hendrich & Balke, 1997 (Southern Asia)
- Neptosternus rajasthanicus Vazirani, 1975 (Southern Asia)
- Neptosternus regimbarti Peschet, 1917 (Southern Asia)
- Neptosternus resartus Guignot, 1954 (Africa)
- Neptosternus riedeli Hendrich & Balke, 1997 (Southern Asia)
- Neptosternus sabahensis Hendrich & Balke, 1997 (Southern Asia)
- Neptosternus sarawakensis Hendrich & Balke, 1997 (Southern Asia)
- Neptosternus schoedli Hendrich & Balke, 1997 (Southern Asia)
- Neptosternus siamensis Hendrich & Balke, 1997 (Southern Asia)
- Neptosternus simulator Omer-Cooper, 1970 (Africa)
- Neptosternus sinharajaicus Holmen & Vazirani, 1990 (Southern Asia)
- Neptosternus sombuicus Guignot, 1954 (Africa)
- Neptosternus starmuehlneri Wewalka, 1973 (Southern Asia)
- Neptosternus strnadi Hendrich & Balke, 1997 (Southern Asia)
- Neptosternus subopacus Guignot, 1956 (Africa)
- Neptosternus sumatrensis Régimbart, 1895 (Southern Asia)
- Neptosternus susinii Bilardo & Rocchi, 2010 (Africa)
- Neptosternus taiwanensis Hendrich & Balke, 1997 (Southern Asia)
- Neptosternus taprobanicus Sharp, 1890 (Southern Asia)
- Neptosternus thailandicus Hendrich & Balke, 1997 (Southern Asia)
- Neptosternus thiambooni Balke, Hendrich & C. M. Yang, 1997 (Southern Asia)
- Neptosternus togianensis Hendrich & Balke, 1997 (Southern Asia)
- Neptosternus tricuspis Guignot, 1954 (Africa)
- Neptosternus verenae Hendrich & Balke, 1997 (Southern Asia)
- Neptosternus vietnamensis Hendrich & Balke, 1997 (Southern Asia)
- Neptosternus viktordulgeri Balke & Hendrich, 2001 (Southern Asia)
- Neptosternus wewalkai Balke, Hendrich & C. M. Yang, 1997 (Southern Asia)
- Neptosternus winkelmanni Hendrich & Balke, 1997 (Southern Asia)
