= Togian Islands =

Island group in Indonesia

Native name: Kepulauan Togean

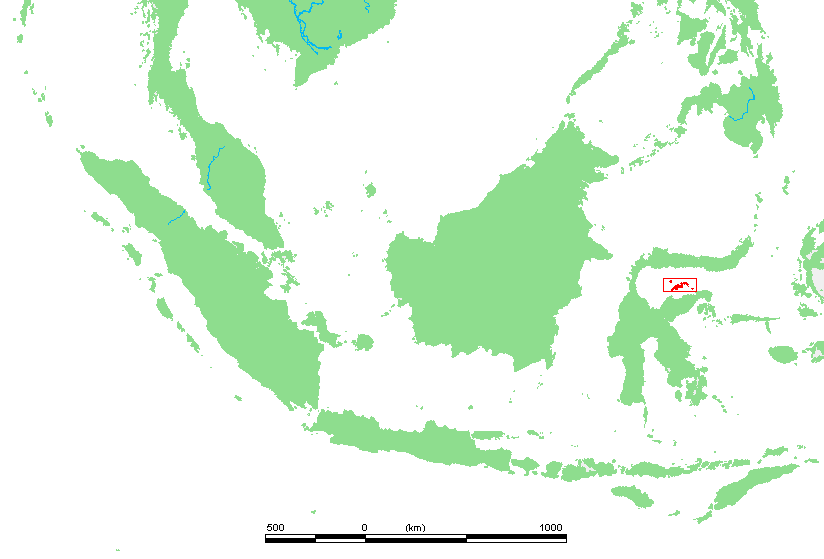
- Map showing the Togian Islands highlighted in red.

Geography
- Location: South-east Asia
- Coordinates: 0°23′30″S 121°57′28″E
- Total islands: 56
- Major islands: Batudaka, Talatako, Togian

Administration
- Indonesia
- Province: Central Sulawesi

Demographics
- Ethnic groups: Bajau

Additional information
- Time zone: ICST (UTC+08:00)

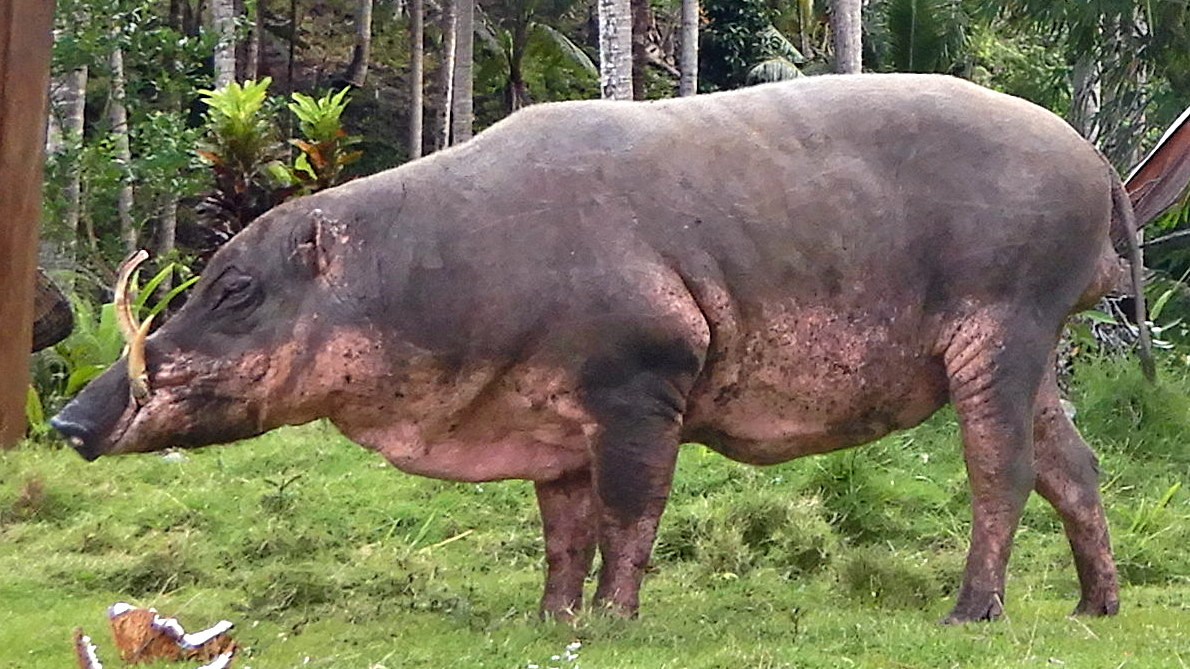
Togian babirusa

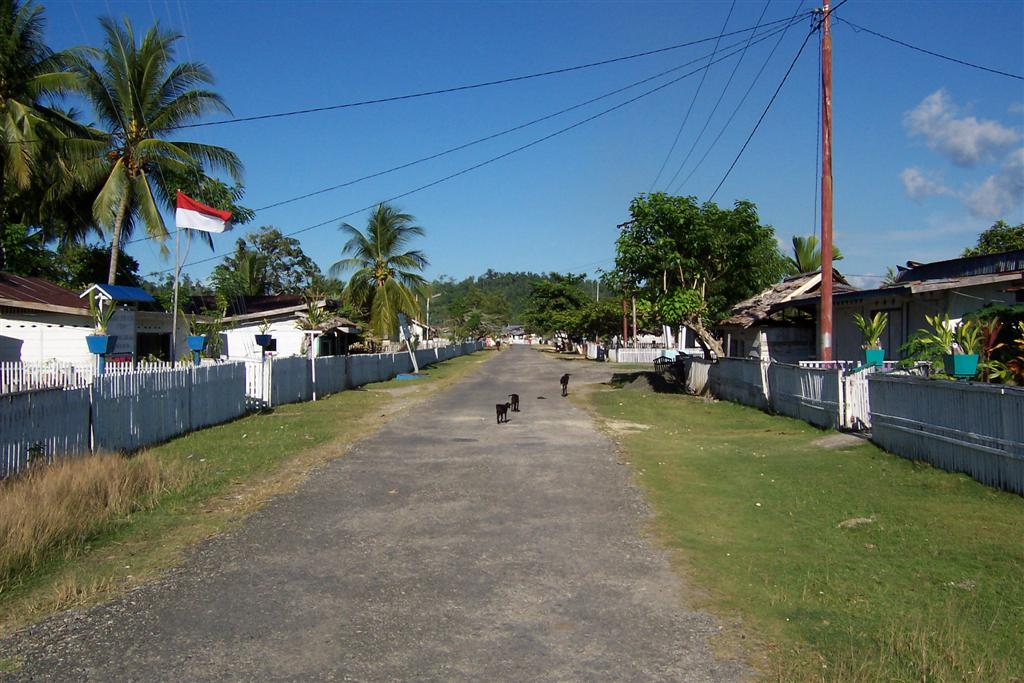
Togian Village

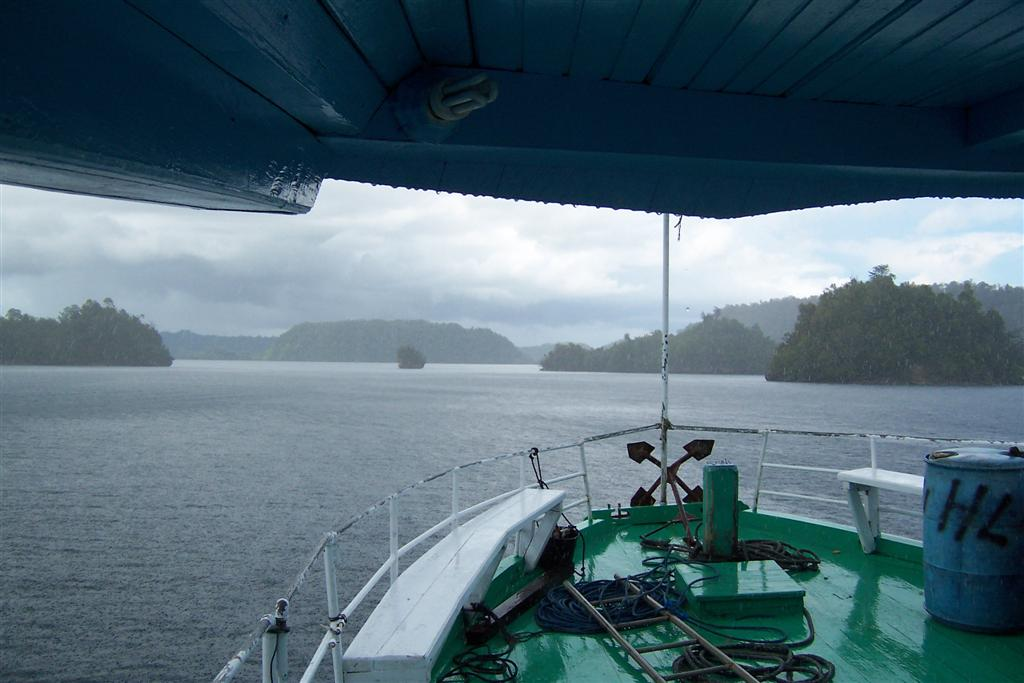
Togian Ferry

The Togian (or Togean) Islands are an archipelago of 56 islands and many offshore islets, situated in the Gulf of Tomini, off the coast of Central Sulawesi, in Indonesia. The largest islands are Batudaka, Togean, Talatako, Una-Una, Walea Bahi, Walea Kodi and Malenge. The islands cover a land area of 763.33 km^{2}, and had 42,530 inhabitants as at mid 2025. There are 59 villages on the islands, with one settled by the Bajau people, more commonly known as the sea gypsies.

== Administration ==
The islands are a part of the Tojo Una-Una Regency within Central Sulawesi Province. At the time of the 2010 Census, the Archipelago was divided into four districts (kecamatan). Subsequent to 2010, two additional districts have been created — Batudaka and Talatako — each comprising an island of the same name (together with small offshore islands). Batudaka Island is to the west of Togian Island (which contains the group's main settlelent of Benteng) and Talatako Island lies to the east of Togian Island; each is separated from Togian Island by a narrow channel. These six districts are tabulated below with their areas and their populations at the 2010 and 2020 Censuses, together with the official estimates as at mid 2025. The table also includes the locations of the district administrative centres, the number of villages (all classed as rural desa) in each district, and their post codes.

| Kode Wilayah | Name of District (kecamatan) | Area in km^{2} | Pop'n Census 2010 | Pop'n Census 2020 | Pop'n Estimate mid 2025 | Admin centre | No. of villages | Post code |
|---|---|---|---|---|---|---|---|---|
| 72.09.01 | Una-Una ^{(a)} | 146.16 | 12,437 | 8,236 | 8,565 | Wakai | 11 | 94690 |
| 72.09.11 | Batudaka | 151.91 | ^{(b)} | 5,796 | 6,036 | Molowagu | 9 | 94690 & 94691 |
| 72.09.02 | Togean ^{(c)} | 229.51 | 9,099 | 10,734 | 11,026 | Lebitii | 16 | 94686 |
| 72.09.03 | Walea Kepulauan (Walea Islands) ^{(d)} | 67.60 | 10,293 | 5,568 | 5,668 | Popoliii | 9 | 94694 |
| 72.09.09 | Walea Besar (Great Walea) ^{(e)} | 84.51 | 3,847 | 4,629 | 4,580 | Pasokani | 8 | 94693 |
| 72.09.12 | Talatako | 83.64 | ^{(f)} | 6,471 | 6,655 | Kaliai | 6 | 94692 |
| Total of | Togean Islands | 763.33 | 35,676 | 41,434 | 42,530 | | 59 | |

Notes: (a) Includes 225 smaller offshore islands and islets. (b) The 2010 Census population of Batudaka District is included in the figure for Una-Una District, from which it was cut out.
(c) Includes 66 smaller offshore islands and islets. (d) The main islands are Walea Kodi and Malenge, but there are 112 smaller offshore islands and islets.
(e) Includes 12 smaller offshore islands and islets. (f) The 2010 Census population of Talatako District is included in the figure for Walea Kepulauan District, from which it was cut out.

== Geology and ecology ==
Formed by volcanic activity, the islands are covered by rainforest and surrounded by coral reef formations, which provide habitat and breeding areas for hawksbill turtle, green turtle and the dugong. The Tonkean macaque is found in the islands' forests. The animals endemic to the islands include the Togian babirusa and the Togian hawk-owl, which was discovered in 1999. The Togian white-eye, another endemic bird species, was described in 2008. Non-venomous jellyfish are also found in Togian Islands, the unique one is jellyfish with little red spots.

== National Park ==
On 2004, the government established a part of Togean Islands as a National Park consists of 292,000 hectares of sea water (includes 132,000 hectares of coral reef which is the largest in Indonesia), 70,000 hectares of land and 10,659 hectares reservation of forests and mangroves.

== Access ==
Access to the Togean Islands is primarily facilitated through air and sea transportation. Travelers can fly to nearby airports such as Palu (PLW), Gorontalo (GTO), or Luwuk (LUW), before continuing their journey by land to the coastal towns of Ampana or Gorontalo. From these towns, visitors can take public ferries, speedboats, or chartered boats to the islands.

Ferry services from Ampana and Gorontalo to Wakai operate twice a week, while speedboats and chartered boats from Ampana offer more flexible schedules. Travel times vary based on the specific island destination and mode of transport, with speedboats providing the fastest option. It is advisable to consult with local resorts and tourism operators for the most up-to-date information on schedules and transportation options when planning a trip to the Togean Islands.

== Tourism ==
The Togian Islands are mostly known by travelers for their incredible diving spots, usually reached from the different resorts located on the islands. As of early 2023, there were about 20 resorts available in the Togean Islands, which could be accessed either from Ampana or from Gorontalo, by public or private boat.

The most visited resorts as per 2023 are as follows:

- Reconnect - Private Island Resort, located on Buka Buka Island
- Fadhila Cottages, located on Katupat Island
- Kadidiri Paradise, located on Kadidiri Island
- Bahia Tomini, located on Malenge Island
- Sanctum Dive Resort, located on Una-Una Island

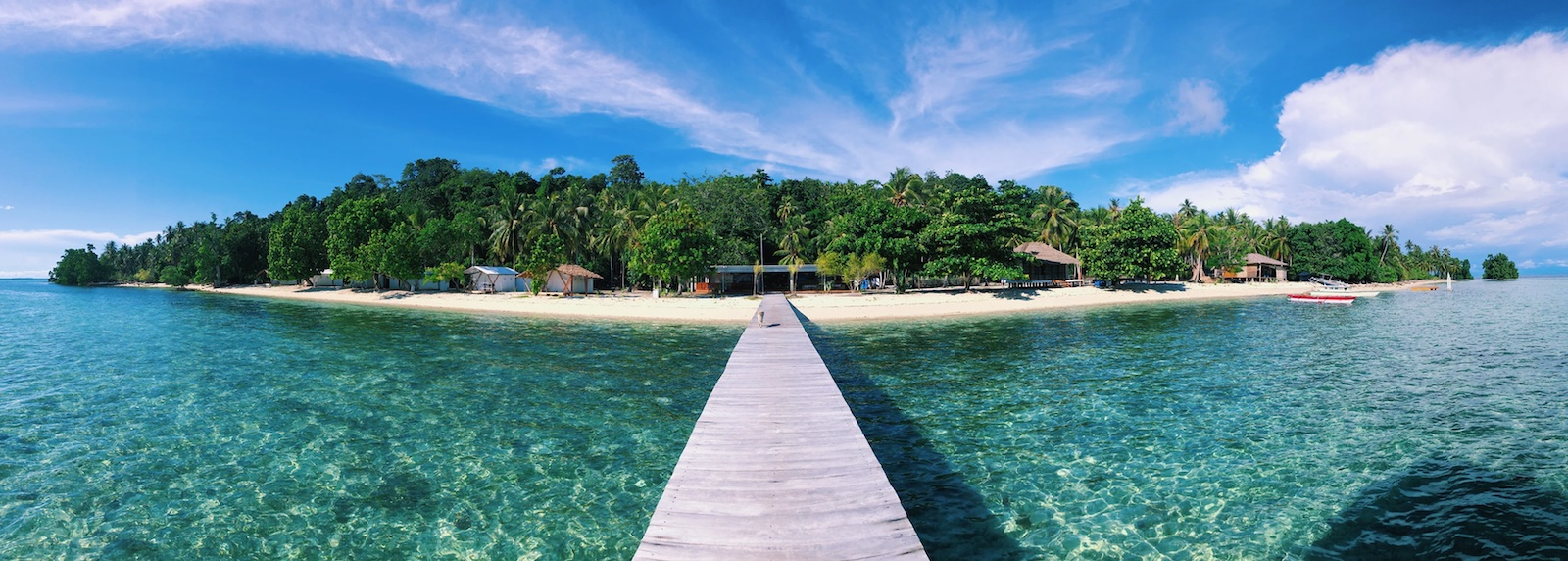
Buka Buka Island, at the door of the Togean Islands

Although the tourism sector was badly impacted during the Covid-19 pandemic, started to pick up again by 2023, and around 12,000 tourists were projected to travel there in 2023.

== See also ==
- Kepulauan Togean National Park
- Buka Buka Island
- Una-Una Island
- Togean Island
