= Tanjung Api =

Cape of Fire in Indonesia

Coordinates: 0.8129°S 121.6222°E

Tanjung Api or Cape of Fire is a cape where there are unique natural phenomenon located in Tomini Ampana Bay, Tojo Una-Una Regency, Central Sulawesi Province, Indonesia.

The name "Tanjung Api" translates to "Cape of Fire," which refers to the natural gas that seeps from the ground and can spontaneously ignite when exposed to air. This rare and fascinating natural occurrence makes Tanjung Api a notable destination for both tourists and researchers alike.
