= Tojo Una-Una Regency =

Regency in Central Sulawesi, Indonesia

Tojo Una-Una Regency Kabupaten Tojo Una-Una
- Regency
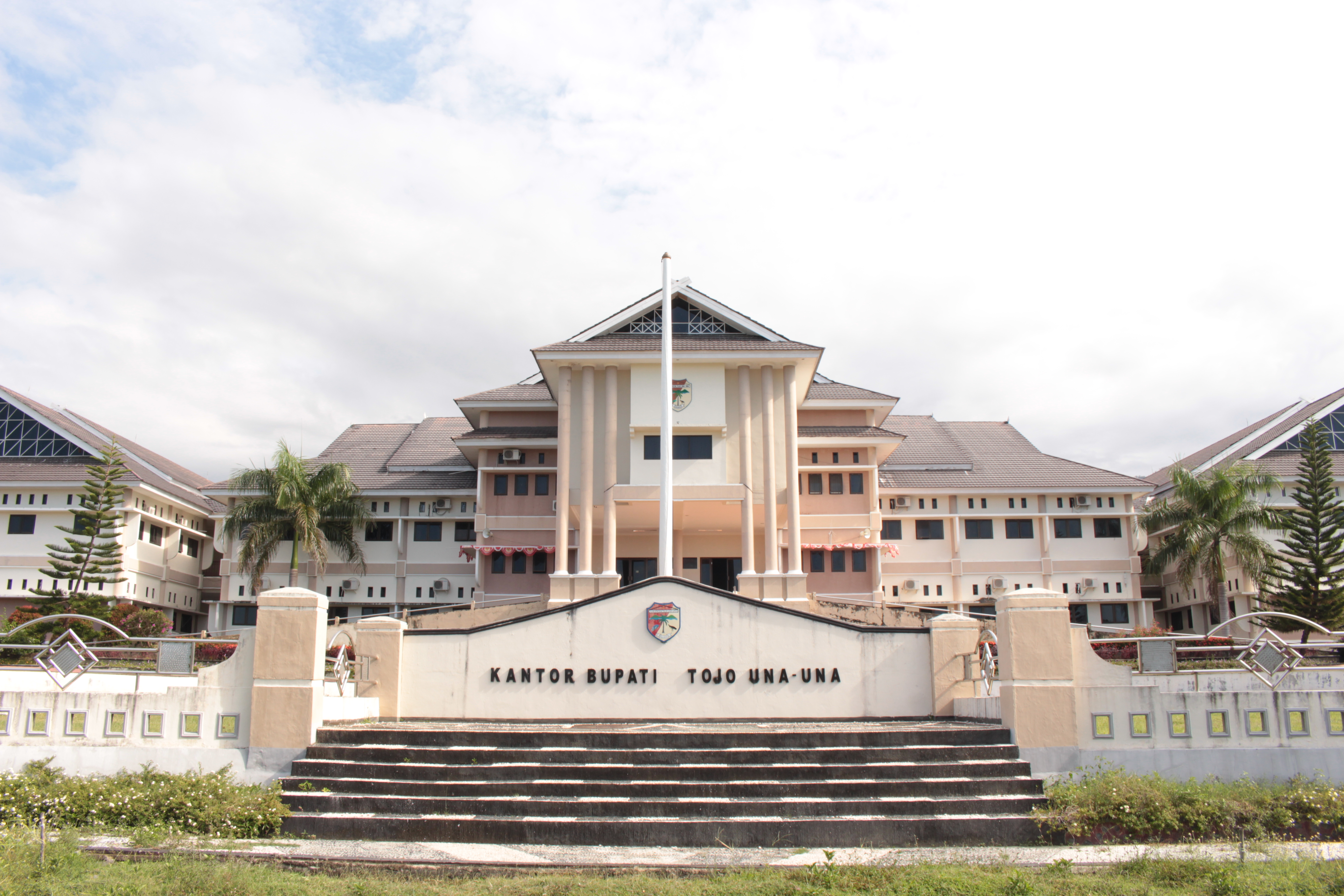
- Regent office of Tojo Una-Una in Ampana

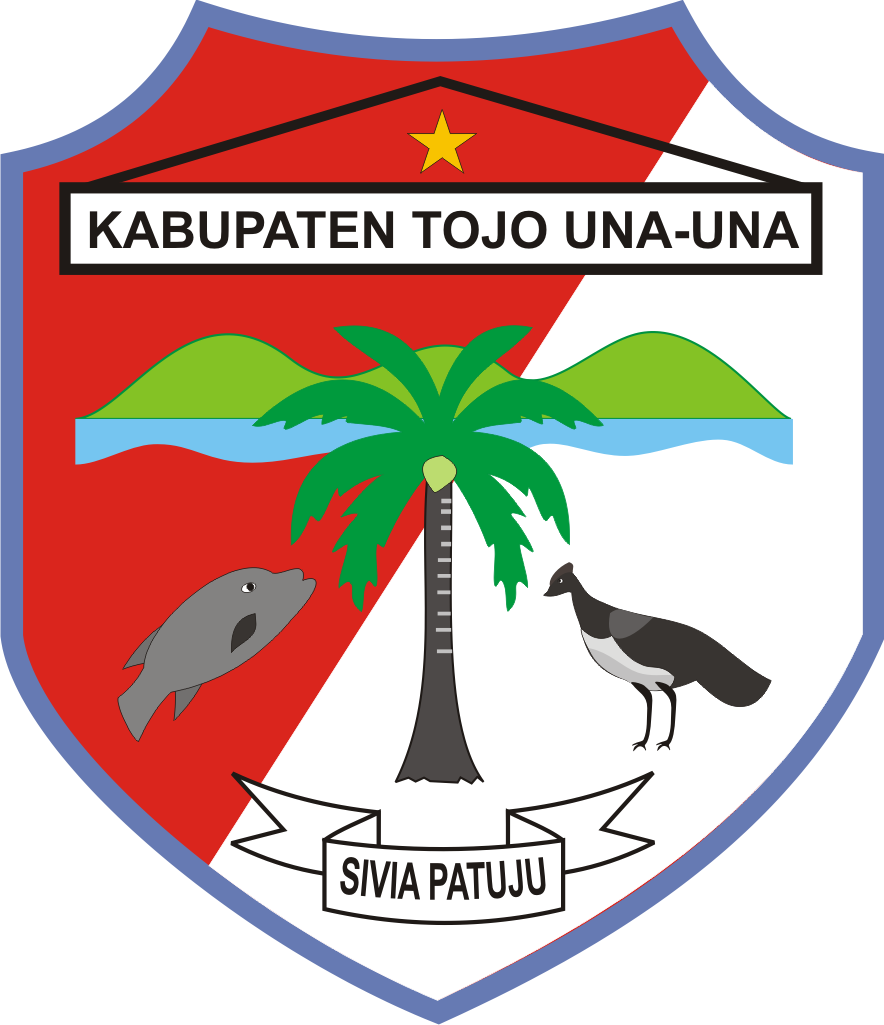
- Coat of arms
- Motto: Sivia Patuju (One Purpose)
- Location within Central Sulawesi

- Location in Sulawesi and Indonesia Tojo Una-Una Regency (Indonesia)
- Coordinates: 0°52′32″S 121°37′47″E
- Country: Indonesia
- Province: Central Sulawesi
- Capital: Ampana

Government
  - Regent: Ilham S. Lawidu
  - Vice Regent: Surya

Area
  - Total: 5,721.51 km^{2} (2,209.09 sq mi)

Population (mid 2025 estimate)
  - Total: 175,505
  - Density: 30.6746/km^{2} (79.4468/sq mi)
- Time zone: UTC+8 (ICST)
- Area code: (+62) 464
- Website: tojounaunakab.go.id

Tojo Una-Una Regency is a regency of Central Sulawesi, Indonesia. The administrative centre is at Ampana town, on the Sulawesi 'mainland'. While the Regency includes a considerable area on the eastern peninsula of Sulawesi, it also includes the Togian Islands in the Gulf of Tomini. The total area covers 5,721.51 km^{2} and the population was 137,810 at the 2010 Census and 163,829 at the 2020 Census; the official estimate as at mid 2025 was 175,505 (comprising 90,117 males and 85,388 females).

== History ==
On 18 December 2003, Tojo Una-Una Regency was created out of the former north-eastern districts of Poso Regency.

== Administration ==
At the time of the 2010 Census, the Tojo Una-Una Regency was divided into nine districts (kecamatan). Subsequent to 2010, three additional districts have been created - Batudaka and Talatako in the Togian Islands, and Ratolindo on the Sulawesi mainland. These 12 districts (6 on the 'mainland' of Sulawesi and 6 forming the archipelago of the Togian Islands) are tabulated below with their areas and their populations at the 2010 and 2020 Censuses, together with the official estimates as at mid 2025. The table also includes the locations of the district administrative centres, the number of villages in each district (totaling 134 rural desa and 12 urban kelurahan - the latter all on the Sulawesi mainland), and their post codes.

Kode Wilayah	Name of District (kecamatan)	Area in km^{2}	Pop'n Census 2010	Pop'n Census 2020	Pop'n Estimate mid 2025	Admin centre	No. of villages	Post code
72.09.07	Tojo Barat (West Tojo)	1,092.27	11,354	12,992	13,292	Tombiano	13	94680
72.09.08	Tojo	1,065.48	12,460	13,928	15,248	Uekuli	16	94681
72.09.06	Ulubongka	1,767.11	15,654	18,272	20,278	Marowo	18	94682
72.09.04	Ampana Tete	796.02	22,367	27,614	30,016	Tete A	20	94684
72.09.05	Ampana Kota (Ampana Town)	175.42	40,299	20,854	23,025	Ampana	10 ^{(a)}	94683
72.09.10	Ratolindo	61.88	^{(b)}	28,735	31,116	Sumoli	10 ^{(c)}	94683: 94695
Total of	Sulawesi mainland	4,958.18	102.134	122,395	132,975		87	
72.09.01	Una-Una	146.16	12,437	8,236	8,565	Wakai	11	94690
72.09.11	Batudaka	151.91	^{(d)}	5,796	6,036	Molowagu	9	94690 & 94691
72.09.02	Togean	229.51	9,099	10,734	11,026	Lebitii	16	94686
72.09.03	Walea Kepulauan (Walea Islands)	67.60	10,293	5,568	5,668	Popoliii	9	94694
72.09.09	Walea Besar (Great Walea)	84.51	3,847	4,629	4,580	Pasokani	8	94693
72.09.12	Talatako	83.64	^{(e)}	6,471	6,655	Kaliai	6	94692
Total of	Togean Islands	763.33	35,676	41,434	42,530		59	

Notes: (a) Ampana Town District comprises 6 kelurahan (Ampana, Bailo, Bailo Baru, Bonerato, Labiabae and Saluaba) and 4 desa.
(b) The 2010 Census population of Ratolindo District is included in the figure for Ampana Kota District, from which it was cut out.
(c) Ratolindo District comprises 6 kelurahan (Dondo, Dondo Barat, Muara Toba, Uemalingku, Uentanaga Atas and Uentanaga Bawah) and 4 desa.
(d) The 2010 Census population of Batudaka District is included in the figure for Una-Una District, from which it was cut out.
(e) The 2010 Census population of Talatako District is included in the figure for Walea Kepulauan District, from which it was cut out.

== Dive sites ==
The best place to do diving is Una-Una volcanic island.

Based on Badan Koordinasi Survei dan Pemetaan Nasional (Bakosurtanal) or Coordinating Agency for Surveys and Mapping, there are 33 dive sites disperses from north to south beaches of the Togian Islands with fringing reefs, barrier reefs, patch reefs and atolls. The area has the third most biodiversity in the world and is a series of Bunaken National Marine Park and Raja Ampat Islands.
