= Economy of the Democratic Republic of the Congo =

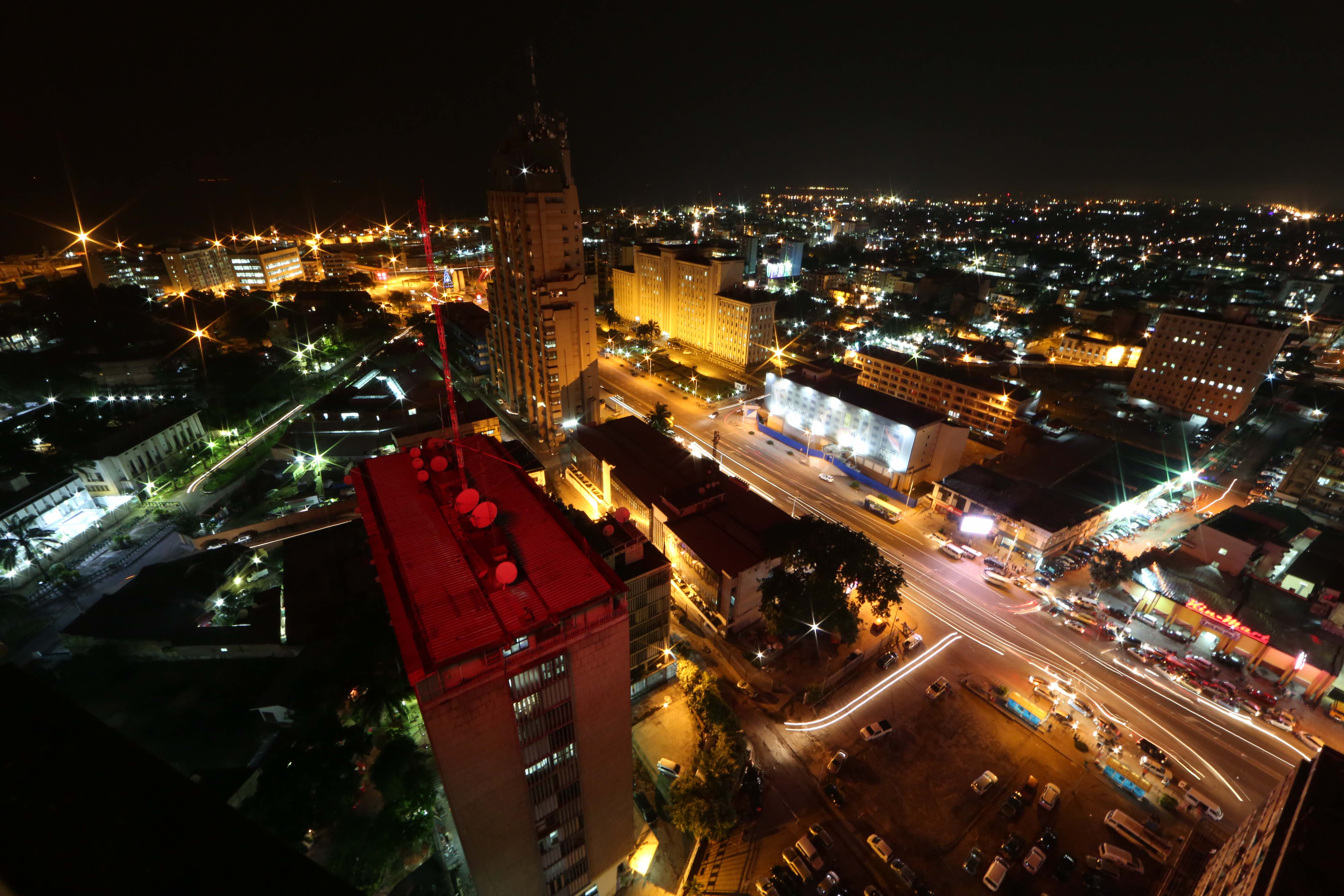
- Kinshasa, capital and economic center of the Democratic Republic of the Congo
- Currency: Congolese Franc (CDF)
- Fiscal year: Calendar year
- Trade organisations: AU, AfCFTA (signed), AfDB, SADC, COMESA, ECCAS, SADC, WTO, Group of 77
- Country group: Least developed; Low-income economy

Statistics
- Population: ▲95,894,118 (2021)
- GDP: ▲$79.12 billion (nominal; 2025); ▲$200.76 billion (PPP; 2025)
- GDP rank: 83rd (nominal; 2025); 79th (PPP; 2025)
- GDP growth: 4.7% (2025)
- GDP per capita: ▲$742 (nominal; 2025); ▲$1,880 (PPP; 2025)
- GDP per capita rank: 179th (nominal; 2025); 180th (PPP; 2025)
- GDP per capita growth: 2.4% (2025)
- GDP by sector: primary sector: 44.2%; industry: 22.6%; services: 33.1%; (2012 est.)
- Inflation (CPI): 5.0% (2020 est.)
- Population below national poverty line: 63.9% (2012); 76.6% on less than $1.90/day (2012)
- Gini coefficient: 42.1 medium (2012)
- Human Development Index: ▲0.479 low (2021) (179th); 0.341 IHDI (2021)
- Corruption Perceptions Index: 20 out of 100 points (2023, 162nd rank)
- Labour force: ▲29,699,289 (2019); 63.1% employment rate (2012)
- Labour force by occupation: N/A
- Unemployment: 4.5% (2022)
- Informal employment: 96.3% (2020)
- Main industries: mining (copper, cobalt, gold, diamonds, coltan, zinc, tin, tungsten), mineral processing, consumer products (including textiles, plastics, footwear, cigarettes, processed foods, beverages), metal products, lumber, cement, commercial ship repair

External
- Exports: ▲$8.872 billion (2012 est.)
- Export goods: gold, diamonds, copper, cobalt, coltan, zinc, tin, tungsten, crude oil, wood products, coffee
- Main export partners: China 68.9%; United Arab Emirates 7.02% (2023)
- Imports: ▲$8.187 billion (2012 est.)
- Import goods: machinery, transportation equipment, fuel, food
- Main import partners: China 34.9%; Zambia 12.5%; South Africa 12.1% (2023)
- Gross external debt: ▲$6.089 billion (31 December 2012 est.)

Public finance
- Foreign reserves: ▲$1.633 billion (31 December 2012 est.)
- Revenue: $4.943 billion (2018 est.)
- Spending: $5.198 billion (2018 est.)
- All values, unless otherwise stated, are in US dollars.

The Democratic Republic of the Congo has a developing transition economy. Its has declined drastically in the years leading up to and during the First and Second Congo Wars, despite being home to vast potential in natural resources and mineral wealth; its gross domestic product is $79.12 billion as of 2025. During the last five reported years, the exports of the DRC has changed by $15.2 billion from $13.3 billion in 2017 to $28.5B in 2022. Since 2003, the DRC's economy has gradually grown, but it remains one of the poorest countries in the world.

At the time of its independence in 1960, the Democratic Republic of the Congo was the second most industrialized country in Africa after South Africa. It had a thriving mining sector, and its agriculture sector was relatively productive. Since then, decades of corruption, war, and political instability have been a severe detriment to further growth, today leaving DRC with a GDP per capita and a HDI rating that rank among the world's lowest and make the DRC one of the most fragile and, according to the United Nations, least developed countries in the world.

Despite this, the DRC is quickly modernizing; it tied with Malaysia for the largest positive change in HDI development in 2016. Government projects include strengthening the health system for maternal and child health, expansion of electricity access, water supply reconstructions, and urban and social rehabilitation programs.

== Economic implications of conflicts ==
The two recent conflicts (the First and Second Congo Wars), which began in 1996, have dramatically reduced national output and government revenue, have increased external debt, and have resulted in the deaths of more than five million people from war and associated famine and disease. Malnutrition affects approximately two-thirds of the country's population.

Agriculture is the mainstay of the economy, accounting for 57.9% of GDP in 1997. In 1996, agriculture employed 66% of the workforce.

Rich in minerals, the Democratic Republic of the Congo has a difficult history of predatory mineral extraction, which has been at the heart of many struggles within the country for many decades, but particularly in the 1990s. The economy of the second largest country in Africa relies heavily on mining. However, much economic activity occurs in the informal sector and is not reflected in GDP data.

In 2006, Transparency International ranked the Democratic Republic of the Congo 156 out of 163 countries in the Corruption Perception Index, tying Bangladesh, Chad, and Sudan with a 2.0 rating. President Joseph Kabila established the Commission of Repression of Economic Crimes upon his ascension to power in 2001.

The conflicts in the Democratic Republic of the Congo were over water, minerals, and other resources. A large proportion of fatalities in the country are attributed to a lack of basic services, recognized as "communicable, maternal, perinatal, and nutritional conditions," which account for 56% of deaths by broad cause as of 2021. The influx of refugees since the war in 1998 only serves to worsen the issue of poverty. Money of the taxpayers in the DRC is often misappropriated, while the elites are given various forms of exemption. The DRC is consistently ranked among the lowest countries on the UN Human Development Index.

== Economic history ==
Per capita GDP in the DRC, 1950–2018. Figures are inflation-adjusted to 2011 International dollars.

The DRC's GDP, 2000 to 2008

=== After Leopold ===
Forced labor (slavery) was important for the rural sector. The corporations that dominated the economy were mostly owned by Belgium, but British capital also played an important role. The 1950s were a period of rising income and expectations. Congo was said to have the best public health system in Africa, but there was also a huge wealth disparity. Belgian companies favored workers in certain areas more and exported them to work in different areas, restricting opportunities for others. Favored groups also received better education and were able to secure jobs for people in the same ethnic group, which increased tensions. In 1960 there were only 16 university graduates out of a population of 20 million. Belgium still had economic power, and independence gave little opportunity for improvement. Common refrains included "no elite, no trouble" and "before independence = after independence." When the Belgians left, most of the government officials and educated residents left with them. Before independence, there were just 3 out of 5000 government jobs held by Congolese people. The resulting loss of institutional knowledge and human capital crippled the government.

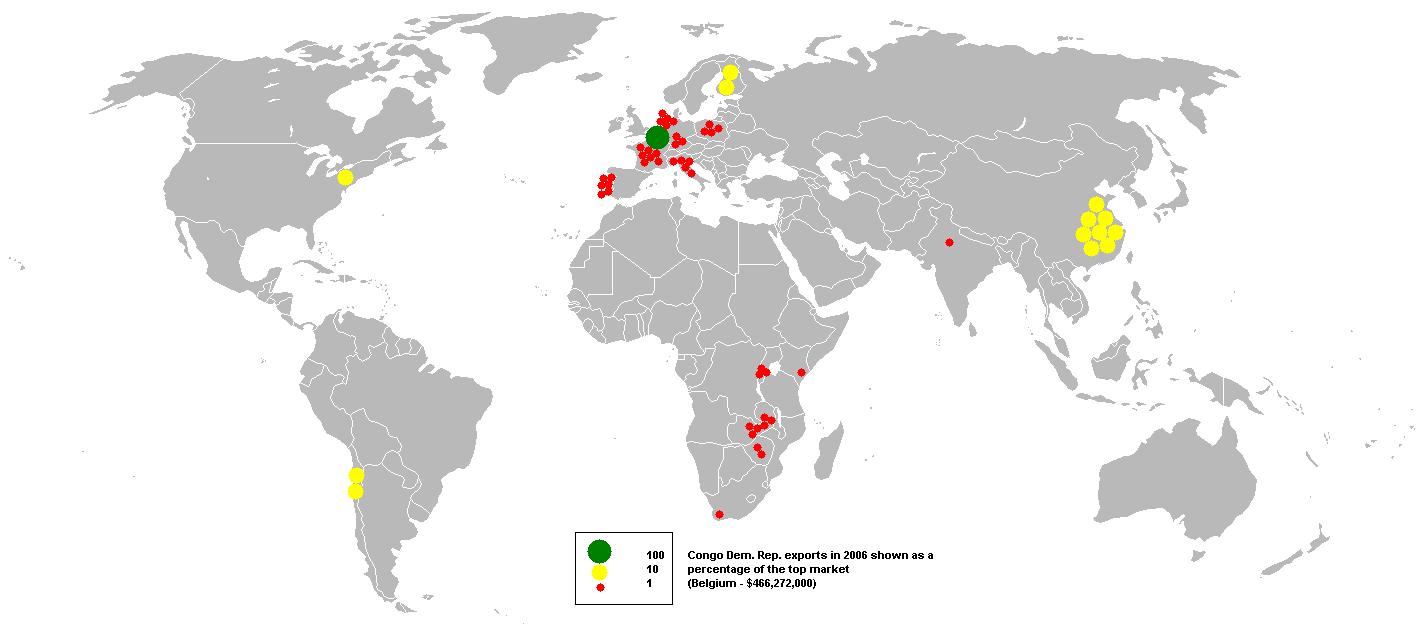
Congolese exports in 2006.

=== Zaire ===
After the Congo Crisis, Mobutu arose as the country's sole ruler and stabilized the country politically. Economically, however, the situation continued to decline, and by 1979, the purchasing power was only 4% of that from 1960. Starting in 1976, the IMF provided stabilizing loans to the dictatorship. Much of the money was embezzled by Mobutu and his circle.

This was not a secret, as the 1982 report by IMF's envoy, Erwin Blumenthal, documented. He stated, "It is alarmingly clear that the corruptive system in Zaire, with all its wicked and ugly manifestations, its mismanagement and fraud, will destroy all endeavors of international institutions, of friendly governments, and of the commercial banks towards recovery and rehabilitation of Zaire’s economy".

Blumenthal indicated that there was "no chance" that creditors would ever recover their loans. Yet the IMF and the World Bank continued to lend money that was either embezzled, stolen, or "wasted on white elephant projects". "Structural adjustment programmes" implemented as a condition of IMF loans cut support for health care, education, and infrastructure.

=== 1990s ===
Poor infrastructure, an uncertain legal framework, corruption, and lack of openness in government economic policy and financial operations remain a brake on investment and growth. In the early 1990s, a number of International Monetary Fund (IMF) and World Bank missions met with the government to help it develop a coherent economic plan, but without reform being implemented.

Faced with continued currency depreciation, the government resorted to more drastic measures and in January 1999 banned the widespread use of American dollars for all domestic commercial transactions, a position it later adjusted. The government has been unable to provide foreign exchange for economic transactions, while it has resorted to printing money to finance its expenditure. Growth was negative in 2000 because of the difficulty of meeting the conditions of international donors, continued low prices of key exports, and post-coup instability.

=== 2000s ===
DRC's economic growth decelerated from its pre-COVID level of 4.4% in 2019 to an estimated 0.8% in 2020. Growth was driven by the extractives sector which, helped by robust demand from China, expanded by 6.9% in 2020 (compared to 1% in 2019). Meanwhile, non-mining sectors contracted by 1.6% (vs. growth of 5.7% in 2019) due to pandemic-related mobility restrictions, weaker trading activities and constrained government spending. Private consumption and government investment fell in 2020 by an estimated 1.0% and 10.2%, respectively.

==== Special economic zones ====
The DRC planned to establish special economic zones (SEZ) to encourage the revival of its industry. The first SEZ was planned to come into being in 2012 in N'Sele, a commune of Kinshasa, and will focus on agro-industries. The Congolese authorities also planned to open another zone dedicated to mining (Katanga) and a third dedicated to cement (in the Kongo Central). There are three phases to the program that each have their own objectives. Phase I was the precursor to the actual investment in the Special Economic Zone, where policymakers agreed to the framework, the framework was studied for its establishment, and to predict the potential market demand for the land. Stage one of Phase II involved submitting laws for the Special Economic Zone, finding good sites for businesses, and currently there is an effort to help the government attract foreign investment. Stage two of Phase II hasn't been started yet, and it involves assisting the government in creating a framework for the country, creating an overall plan for the site, figuring out what the environmental impact of the project will be, and guessing how much it will cost and what the return can be made on the investment. Phase III involves the World Bank creating a transaction phase that will keep everything competitive. The program is looking for options to hand over the program to the World Bank, which could be very beneficial for the western part of the country.

== Gross Domestic Product (GDP) ==
=== GDP (Nominal) ===
The size of the Democratic Republic of the Congo's economy, 1980-2030 (In millions of nominal US$ dollars)

Source: International Monetary Fund (IMF)

=== GDP per capita (nominal) ===
GDP per capita (Nominal) of the Democratic Republic of the Congo, 1980-2030 (In nominal US$ dollars)

Source: International Monetary Fund (IMF)

== Economic implications of instability ==
Ongoing conflicts dramatically reduced government revenue and increased external debt. As Reyntjens wrote, "Entrepreneurs of insecurity are engaged in extractive activities that would be impossible in a stable state environment. The criminalization context in which these activities occur offers avenues for considerable factional and personal enrichment through the trafficking of arms, illegal drugs, toxic products, mineral resources and dirty money." Ethnic rivalries were made worse because of economic interests and looting and coltan smuggling took place. Illegal monopolies formed in the country where they used forced labor for children to mine or work as soldiers. National parks were overrun with people looking to exploit minerals and resources. Increased poverty and hunger from the war increased the hunting of rare wildlife. Education was denied when the country was under foreign control, and very few people made money off the minerals in the country. The national resources are not the root cause of the continued fighting in the region; however, the competition has become an incentive to keep fighting.[1] The DRC's level of economic freedom is one of the lowest in the world, putting it in the repressed category. The armed militias fight with the government in the eastern section of the country over the mining sector or the corruption of the government, and weak policies lead to the instability of the economy. Human rights abuses also ruin economic activity; the DRC has a 7% unemployment rate but still has one of the lowest GDPs per capita in the world. A major problem for people trying to start their own companies is that the minimum amount of capital needed to launch the company is five times the average annual income, and prices are regulated by the government, which almost forces people to have to work for the larger, more corrupt businesses; otherwise, they won't have work. It is hard for the DRC to encourage foreign trade because of the regulatory barriers.

== International relations ==
Exports of the Democratic Republic of the Congo by product category (2019) Chemical products Transportation Machines Mineral products Plastics and rubbers Metals Foodstuffs Precious metals Textiles Instruments Animal products Vegetable products Paper goods Footwear and headwear Miscellaneous Stone and glass Wood products Animal and vegetable bi-products Animal hides Arts and antiques Weapons

Poor infrastructure, an uncertain legal framework, corruption, and lack of openness in government economic policy and financial operations remain a brake on investment and growth. A number of International Monetary Fund (IMF) and World Bank missions have met with the new government to help it develop a coherent economic plan, but associated reforms are on hold.

Faced with continued currency depreciation, the government resorted to more drastic measures and in January 1999 banned the widespread use of U.S. dollars for all domestic commercial transactions, a position it later adjusted. The government has been unable to provide foreign exchange for economic transactions, while it has resorted to printing money to finance its expenditure. Growth was negative in 2000 because of the difficulty of meeting the conditions of international donors, continued low prices of key exports, and post-coup instability. 125 companies in 2003 contributed to the conflict in DRC, showing the corruption.

=== Foreign trade statistics ===
Year	Goods Export (billion US$)	Goods Imports (in billion US$)	Net trade (in billion US$)
2023	▲$29.6	▲$28.0	▲$1.6
2022	▲$28.7	▲$26.7	▲$2.0
2021	▲$22.2	▲$18.3	▲$3.9
2020	▲$13.8	▲$11.9	▲$1.9
2015	▲$10.3	▲$10.6	▼$-0.3
2010	▲$8.5	▲$8.0	▲$0.4
2005	$2.4	$2.7	▼$-0.3

=== World Bank ===
With the help of the International Development Association the DRC has worked toward the reestablishment of social services. This is done by giving 15 million people access to basic health services and giving bed nets to prevent malaria from spreading to people. With the Emergency Demobilization and Reintegration Program, more than 107,000 adults and 34,000 child soldiers stood down their militarized posture. The travel time from Lubumbashi to Kasomeno in Katanga went down from seven days to two hours because of the improved roads, which led to the decrease of prices of main goods by 60%. With the help of the IFC, KfW, and the EU, the DRC improved its businesses by reducing the time it took to create a business by 51%, reducing the time it took to get construction permits by 54%, and reducing the number of taxes from 118 to 30. Improvements in health have been noticeable, specifically that deliveries attended by trained staff jumped from 47 to 80%. In education, 14 million textbooks were provided to children, completion rates of school have increased, and higher education was made available to students that chose to pursue it.

=== International Monetary Fund ===
In 2015, the IMF planned on giving the DRC a $1 billion loan after its two-year suspension following its failure to provide details about a mining deal from one of its state-owned mines and an Israeli billionaire, Dan Gertler. The loan was considered necessary for the country because elections were scheduled for December 2016 for the next president, and the cost of funding this was expected to range around $1.1 billion. The biggest problem with the vote was getting a country of 68 million people the size of Western Europe to polling stations with less than 1,860 miles of paved roads.

Import and export declarations are filed through the Guichet Unique Intégral du Commerce Extérieur (GUICE), an electronic single-window platform. Shipments valued at $2,500 or more undergo pre-shipment inspection by BIVAC; imports also carry a quality-control charge of 2 per cent of FOB value payable to the Office Congolais de Contrôle and a BIVAC fee of 0.75 per cent.

== Sectors ==
=== Agriculture ===
Agriculture is the mainstay of the economy, accounting for 57.9% of the GDP in 1997. Main cash crops include coffee, palm oil, rubber, cotton, sugar, tea, and cocoa. Food crops include cassava, plantains, maize, groundnuts, and rice. In 1996, agriculture employed 66% of the work force.

In 2018, the Democratic Republic of the Congo produced:

- 29.9 million tons of cassava (3rd largest producer in the world, second only to Nigeria and Thailand);
- 4.7 million tons of plantain (largest producer in the world);
- 2 million tons of maize;
- 1.1 million tons of palm oil;
- 990 thousand tons of rice;
- 384 thousand tons of sweet potato;
- 309 thousand tons of banana;
- 307 thousand tons of peanut;
- 213 thousand tons of mango (including mangosteen and guava);
- 213 thousand tons of papaya;
- 205 thousand tons of beans;
- 186 thousand tons of pineapple;
- 168 thousand tons of orange;
- 101 thousand tons of potato;

In addition to smaller productions of other agricultural products, such as coffee (29 thousand tons), cocoa (3.6 thousand tons), natural rubber (14 thousand tons) and tea (3.6 thousand tons).

=== Fishing ===
The Democratic Republic of the Congo also possesses 50 percent of Africa's forests and a river system that could provide hydro-electric power to the entire continent, according to a United Nations report on the country's strategic significance and its potential role as an economic power in central Africa. Fish are the single most important source of animal protein in the DRC. Total production of marine, river, and lake fisheries in 2003 was estimated at 222,965 tons, all but 5,000 tons from inland waters. PEMARZA, a state agency, carries on marine fishing.

=== Forestry ===
Forests cover 60 percent of the total land area. There are vast timber resources, and commercial development of the country's 61 million hectares (150 million acres) of exploitable wooded area is only beginning. The Mayumbe area of Kongo Central was once the major center of timber exploitation, but forests in this area were nearly depleted. The more extensive forest regions of the central cuvette and of the Ubangi River valley have increasingly been tapped.

Roundwood removals were estimated at 72,170,000 m^{2} in 2003, about 95 percent for fuel. Some 14 species are presently being harvested. Exports of forest products in 2003 totaled $25.7 million. Foreign capital is necessary in order for forestry to expand, and the government recognizes that changes in tax structure and export procedures will be needed to facilitate economic growth.

=== Mining ===
Rich in minerals, the DRC has a difficult history of predatory mineral extraction, which has been at the heart of many struggles within the country for many decades, but particularly in the 1990s. Although the economy of the Democratic Republic of the Congo, the second largest country in Africa who has historically relied heavily on mining, is no longer reflected in the GDP data as the mining industry has suffered from a long-term "uncertain legal framework, corruption, and a lack of transparency in government policy." The informal sector.

In her book entitled The Real Economy of Zaire, MacGaffey described a second, often illegal economy, "system D," which is outside the official economy (MacGaffey 1991:27). and therefore is not reflected in the GDP.

== Exploitation of mineral substances by companies ==
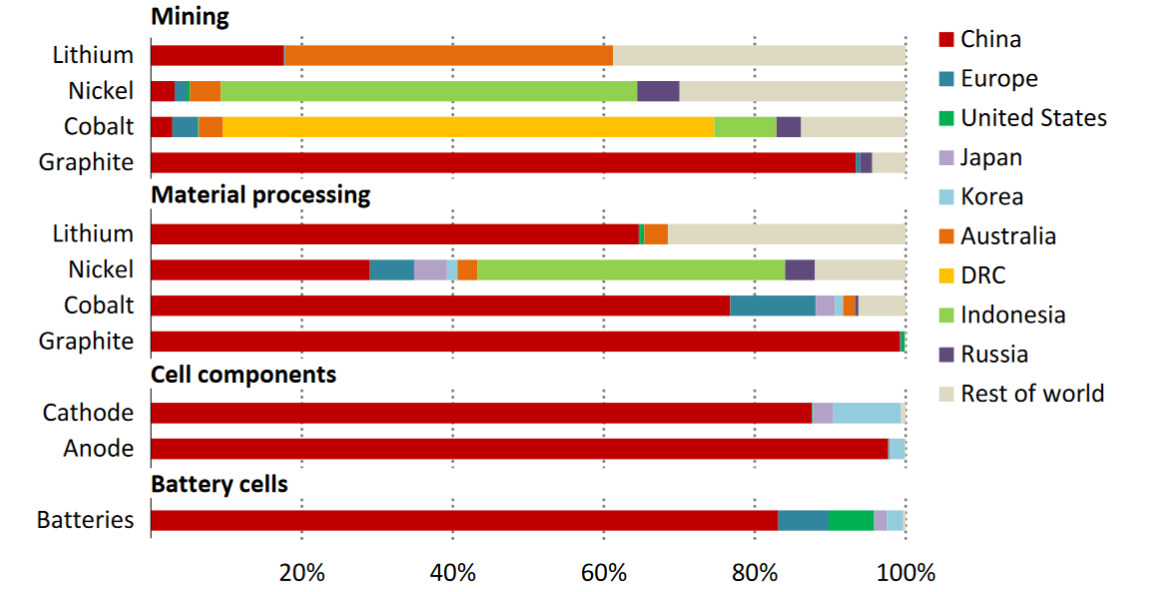
Geographical distribution of the global battery supply chain in 2024.

The economy of the second largest country in Africa relies heavily on mining. The Congo is the world's largest producer of cobalt ore, and a major producer of copper and industrial diamonds. The Congo has more than 30% of the world's diamond reserves., mostly in the form of small, industrial diamonds. The coltan is a major source of tantalum, which is used in the fabrication of electronic components in computers and mobile phones. In 2002, tin was discovered in the east of the country, but, to date, mining has been done on a small scale. Manono in Central DRC has a significant deposit of lithium and tin with tantalum and niobium and is being developed by an Australian company. Production is expected in 2023. According to a 2011 report, the total value of the major mineral reserves in the DRC amounted to a total of over 300 billion US dollars at the time.

Smuggling of the conflict minerals, coltan and cassiterite (ores of tantalum and tin, respectively), has helped fuel the war in the Eastern Congo.

Today's larger mining companies are making changes and adhering to global demand for ESG (Environmental, Social and Governance) and IRMA (Initiative for Responsible Mining Assurance). One such globally recognised certification is the 3T iTSCi, the only widely implemented and accepted mineral traceability and due diligence system in the region for the 3T minerals—tin, tantalum and tungsten—an internationally recognised certification for responsible mining and traceability under the 2010 Dodd-Frank Act. Today, four central African countries, including the DRC, provides legitimate and ethical 3T minerals. ITSCI is the only industry initiative with standards 100% aligned with the OECD Guidance. Much has been done in the last 15 years, providing artisanal and small-scale miners a support network through iTSCi to build the foundations and regulate the industry. At the end of 2019 ITSCI has seen to 2000 mines, employment of around 80,000 miners, and the supply of over 2000 tonnes of tin, tantalum and tungsten minerals per month; the initiative has come a long way in the last decade. A report had been done by Pact in 2015, detailing iTSCi's progress over the previous five years; it discusses the successes, the challenges ahead and the work yet to be done. Entitled Unconflicted: Making Conflict-Free Mining a Reality in the DRC, Rwanda and Burundi.

=== Copper and cobalt ===
Katanga Mining Limited, a London-based company, owns the Luilu Metallurgical Plant, which has a capacity of 175,000 tonnes of copper and 8,000 tonnes of cobalt per year, making it the largest cobalt refinery in the world. After a major rehabilitation program, the company restarted copper production in December 2007 and cobalt production in May 2008.

=== Informal sector ===
Much economic activity occurs in the informal sector and is not reflected in GDP data.

== Infrastructure ==
=== Energy ===
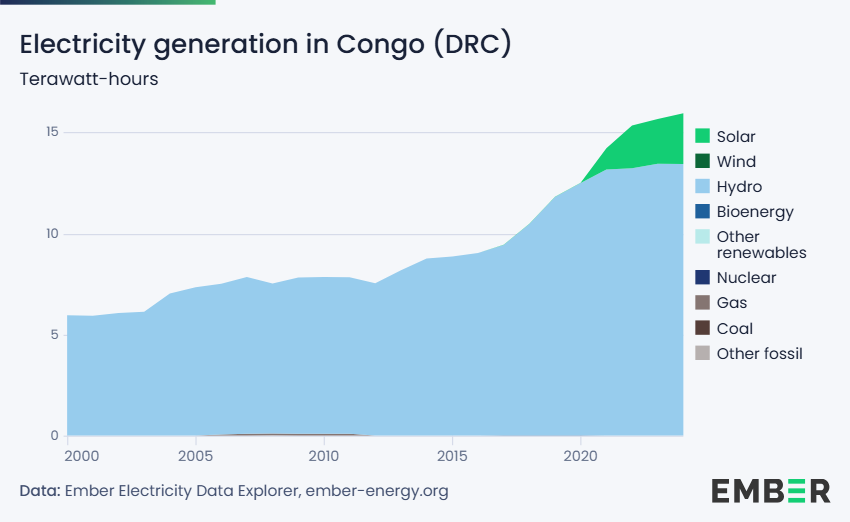
Electricity generation in Congo (DRC) in terawatt-hours

Through its expansive river system, 86% of the electricity in the country is hydroelectric. Electricity is almost only available urban areas. Even there, less than half of the population is able to use it. In 2022, 45% of the urban population, and 21.5% of the total population had access to electricity. In 2025, over 70% of households nationally used charcoal as their primary cooking fuel. Charcoal is used almost exclusively in Kinshasa. Wood and other biomass are used by around 20% of households.

=== Transport ===
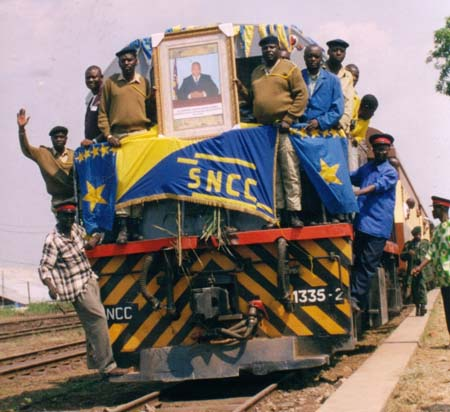
A train from Lubumbashi arriving in Kindu on a newly refurbished line.

Ground transport in the Democratic Republic of the Congo has always been difficult. The terrain and climate of the Congo Basin present serious barriers to road and rail construction, and the distances are enormous across this vast country. Chronic economic mismanagement and internal conflict have led to serious under-investment over many years.

On the other hand, the Democratic Republic of the Congo has thousands of kilometres of navigable waterways, and traditionally, water transport has been the dominant means of moving around approximately two-thirds of the country.

== Data ==
The following table shows the main economic indicators from 1980–2023. Inflation below 5% is in green.

Year	GDP (in billion US$ PPP)	GDP per capita (in US$ PPP)	GDP (in billion US$ nominal)	GDP growth (real)	Inflation (in Percent)	Government debt (in % of GDP)
1980	19.2	766	68.6	▲2.4%	▲40.0%	...
1985	▲26.6	▲902	▼31.9	▲0.5%	▲23.5%	...
1990	▲31.0	▼892	▼41.4	▼−6.6%	▲81.3%	...
1995	▼23.9	▼602	▼25.0	▲2.8%	▲541.8%	...
2000	▼20.0	▼415	▼19.1	▼−8.1%	▲550.0%	135%
2005	▲28.4	▲507	▼12.7	▲9.8%	▲21.5%	▼101%
2006	▲30.8	▲532	▲15.4	▲5.1%	▲12.8%	▲104%
2007	▲34.3	▲574	▲18.6	▲8.5%	▲16.7%	▼87%
2008	▲37.6	▲608	▲22.7	▲7.4%	▲18.0%	▼74%
2009	▲38.1	▲596	▼18.6	▲0.6%	▲46.1%	▲85%
2010	▲41.5	▲630	▲22.3	▲7.8%	▲23.5%	▼31%
2011	▲45.6	▲670	▲26.4	▲7.6%	▲15.0%	▼25%
2012	▲47.4	▲674	▲30.1	▲8.7%	▲0.9%	▼23%
2013	▲57.4	▲791	▲34.9	▲9.6%	▲0.9%	▼20%
2014	▲67.0	▲894	▲38.4	▲7.3%	▲1.2%	▼18%
2015	▲73.1	▲946	▲40.2	▲6.4%	▲1.0%	▼16%
2016	▲78.9	▲989	▼38.1	▲0.4%	▲3.2%	▲19%
2017	▲89.6	▲1,087	▲39.5	▲3.7%	▲35.7%	▼18%
2018	▲96.2	▲1,130	▲48.0	▲4.8%	▲29.3%	▼15%
2019	▲102.3	▼1,164	▲50.9	▲4.5%	▲4.7%	15%
2020	▲105.4	▲1,161	▼48.7	▲1.7%	▲11.4%	▲17%
2021	▲117.0	▲1,248	▲57.3	▲6.2%	▲9.0%	▼16%
2022	▲136.3	▲1,409	▲65.8	▲8.9%	▲9.3%	▼15%
2023	▲150.9	▲1,510	▲67.5	▲6.7%	▲19.1%	▼13%

== See also ==
- Democratic Republic of the Congo
- List of companies based in the Democratic Republic of the Congo
- Mining industry of the Democratic Republic of the Congo
- United Nations Economic Commission for Africa
