= Cobalt extraction =

Metallurgical process

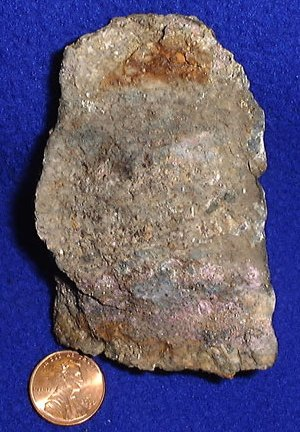
Cobalt ore

Cobalt extraction refers to the techniques used to extract cobalt from its ores and other compound ores. Several methods exist for the separation of cobalt from copper and nickel. They depend on the concentration of cobalt and the exact composition of the ore used.

== Recovery from copper-cobalt sulfide concentrates ==
The ores are treated by a sulfatizing roast in a fluidized bed furnace to convert copper and cobalt sulfides into soluble sulfates and iron into insoluble hematite. The calcine is subsequently leached with sulfuric acid from the spent copper recovery electrolyte. Oxide concentrates are introduced at this leaching step to maintain the acid balance in the circuit. Iron and aluminum are removed from the leach solution by the addition of lime, and copper is electrowon on copper cathodes. A part of the spent electrolyte enters the cobalt recovery circuit and is purified by the removal of iron, copper, nickel, and zinc prior to the precipitation of cobalt as its hydroxide. This is accomplished by the addition of more lime to raise the pH until the remaining copper precipitates. This copper is sent back to the copper circuit. As more lime is then added, a copper-cobaltite precipitates and is fed back to the leaching process. Sodium hydrosulfide (NaHS) is added (along with some metallic cobalt as a catalyst) to precipitate nickel sulfide (NiS). Hydrogen sulfide (H_{2}S) and sodium carbonate (Na_{2}CO_{3}) are then added to precipitate zinc sulfide (ZnS). Lime is then added to saturation to precipitate cobalt(II) hydroxide (Co(OH)_{2}). In the final stages, this cobalt hydroxide is redissolved and the metal is refined by electrolysis. The resulting cobalt cathodes are crushed and vacuum degassed to obtain a pure cobalt metal.

== Recovery from nickel-cobalt sulfide concentrates (Sherritt process) ==
The Sherritt process is a hydrometallurgical process named for Sherritt Gordon Mines Ltd. (now Sherritt International) of Sherridon and Lynn Lake Manitoba Canada, based on the older Forward process developed by Dr. Frank Forward for the recovery of copper and nickel from those same mines. Nickel sulfide concentrates can be treated by either roasting or flash smelting to produce matte from which nickel and cobalt can be recovered hydrometallurgically, or they may be treated by an ammonia solution pressure leach. The residue is removed. A feed of matte and sulfide concentrate containing approximately 0.4% cobalt and 30% sulfur is pressure leached at elevated temperature and pressure in an ammoniacal solution to produce a solution of nickel, copper and cobalt. By boiling away the ammonia; copper is precipitated as a sulfide and sent to a smelter. Hydrogen sulfide is added to the autoclave to remove nickel sulfide and copper sulfide which is fed back to the leaching process. Air is then passed through the solution in the autoclave for oxyhydrolysis. The solution is then reduced with hydrogen, again at high temperature and pressure, to precipitate nickel powder (>99%). The remaining solution (containing approximately equal proportions of nickel and cobalt sulfides), is then adjusted (to a lower temperature and pressure) to precipitate the mixed sulfides and the fluid is concentrated and crystallized into ammonium sulfate ((NH_{4})_{2}SO_{4}). The mixed sulfides are pressure leached with air and sulfuric acid. Ammonia is then added to remove potassium and iron as jarosite (KFe^{3+}_{3} (OH)_{6}(SO_{4})_{2}). More ammonia and air is added for oxidation. The solution is removed from the autoclave and sulfuric acid added to remove nickel as nickel(II) sulfate-ammonium sulfate hexahydrate ([NiSO_{4}]•[(NH_{4})_{2}SO_{4}]•6H_{2}O) which is then sent to have its nickel recovered. The solution is then further reduced with more sulfuric acid and cobalt metal powder is added to aid in the nucleation of precipitants (seeding). Addition of hydrogen gas to saturation precipitates cobalt powder with a purity of approximately 99.6%.

== Recovery from copper-cobalt oxide concentrates ==
The ore is comminuted and the cobalt rich oxides are separated by froth flotation. The cobalt-bearing concentrate is then mixed with lime and coal, and then melted in a reducing atmosphere. Iron and lighter impurities float to the surface as solid dross or are expelled from the melt as gas. The remaining liquid is composed of a heavier copper smelt containing approximately 5% cobalt that is processed for its copper and a lighter slag that is approximately 40% cobalt that is further refined by hydrometallurgical and electrolytic processing. Concentrations of cobalt oxide (Co_{3}O_{4}) may also be reduced by the aluminothermic reaction or with carbon in a blast furnace.

== Recovery from laterite ores ==
Nickel-cobalt lateritic ores can be treated by either hydrometallurgical processes or pyrometallurgical processes, such as matte or ferronickel smelting, which require the entire ore to be melted and the metal values to be separated from the residual components of the ore. The hydrometallurgical process for laterite ore can use sulfuric acid or ammonia leach solutions.

== Recovery from arsenide ores ==
Arsenic containing concentrates are roasted in a fluidized bed to remove 60% to 70% of the arsenic present as arsenic oxide (As_{2}O_{5}). The roasted ores can be treated with hydrochloric acid and chlorine or with sulfuric acid to give a leach solution that can be purified by hydrometallurgical methods and from which cobalt can be recovered by electro refining or by carbonate precipitation. If hydrochloric acid is used then cobalt may be extracted using alamine 336 in meta-xylene. Cobalt can be extracted also using dialkylphosphinic acid. When cobalt carbonate (CoCO_{3}) is heated (calcined) above 400 °C it decomposes into carbon dioxide (CO_{2}) and cobalt(II) oxide (CoO) and can be refined as an oxide concentrate (see above).

== Electro refining ==
When purifying by electrolysis, an aqueous sulfate solution at 50 to 70 °C is typically used with a lead anode (corrosion products from which will not contaminate the cobalt oxy-hydroxide (CoOOH) electrolyte solution) and a stainless steel cathode which will allow for the easy removal of the deposited cobalt. Electro refining in a chloride or sulfate medium at −0.3 V will make a cathode coating of 99.98% cobalt.

== See also ==
- Category:Cobalt minerals
- Extractive metallurgy
- Metallurgy
