= Frank Forward =

Canadian inventor (1902–1972)

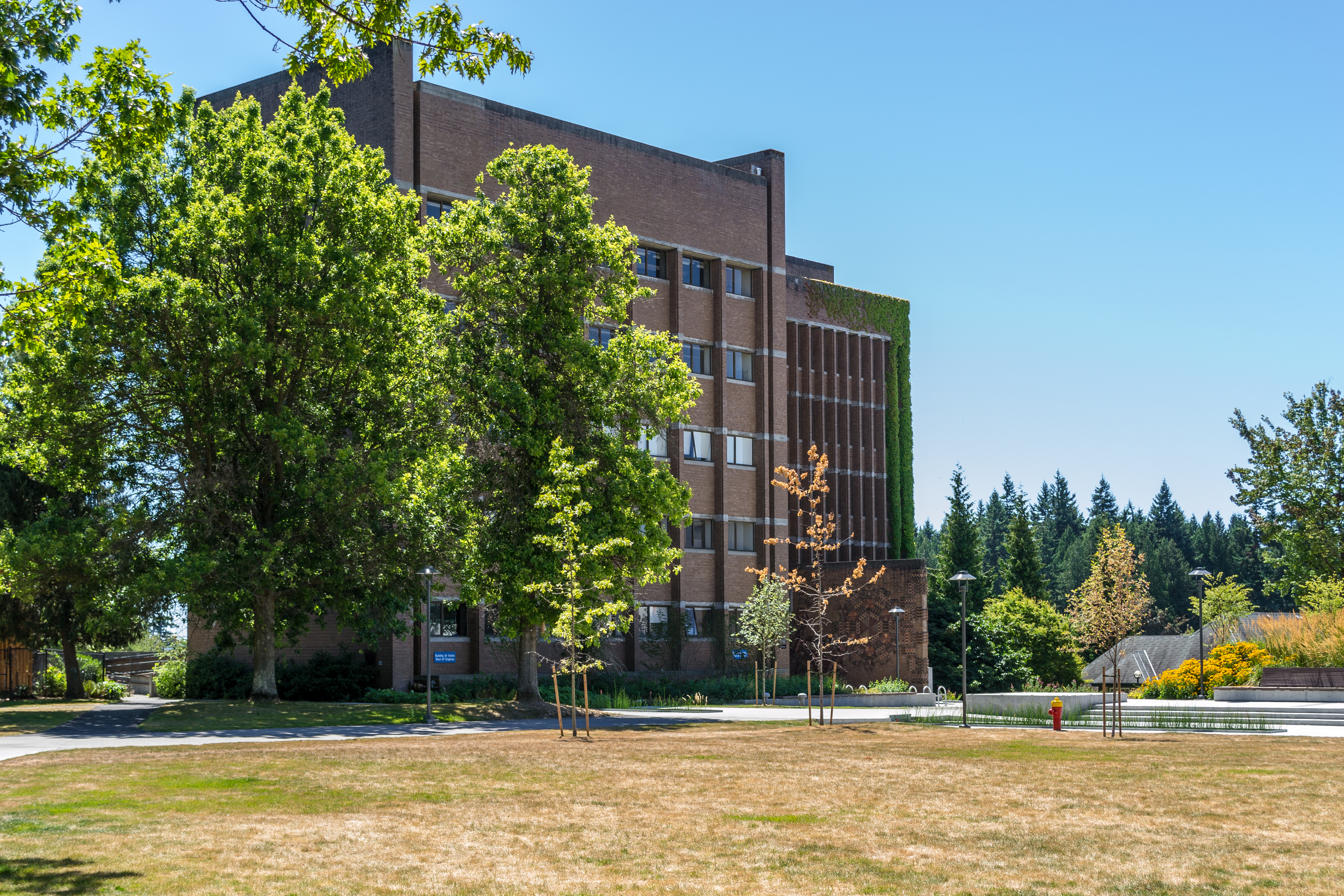
Frank Forward building at the University of British Columbia, named for Forward

Frank Arthur Forward (9 March 1902 – 6 August 1972) was a Canadian metallurgist and inventor. In 1947, he discovered a method for the extraction of nickel and cobalt.

Born 9 March 1902, in Ottawa, Forward graduated from the University of Toronto in 1924. He taught at the University of British Columbia from 1953 to 1964. He served as president of the Canadian Council of Professional Engineers, and helped develop a science policy of Canada.
