= Electric vehicle supply chain =

The electric vehicle supply chain comprises the mining and refining of raw materials and the manufacturing processes that produce batteries, motors, and other components for electric vehicles.

== Background ==
International commitments reflected in the Paris Agreement have led to efforts toward a renewable energy transition as a strategy for climate change mitigation. Green capitalism and sustainable development approaches have informed policy in many countries of the Global North, resulting in rapid growth of the electric vehicle industry, and resulting demands for raw materials. Mainstream projections for electric vehicle uptake assume that there will be more cars in the future.

== Key components ==
=== Batteries ===
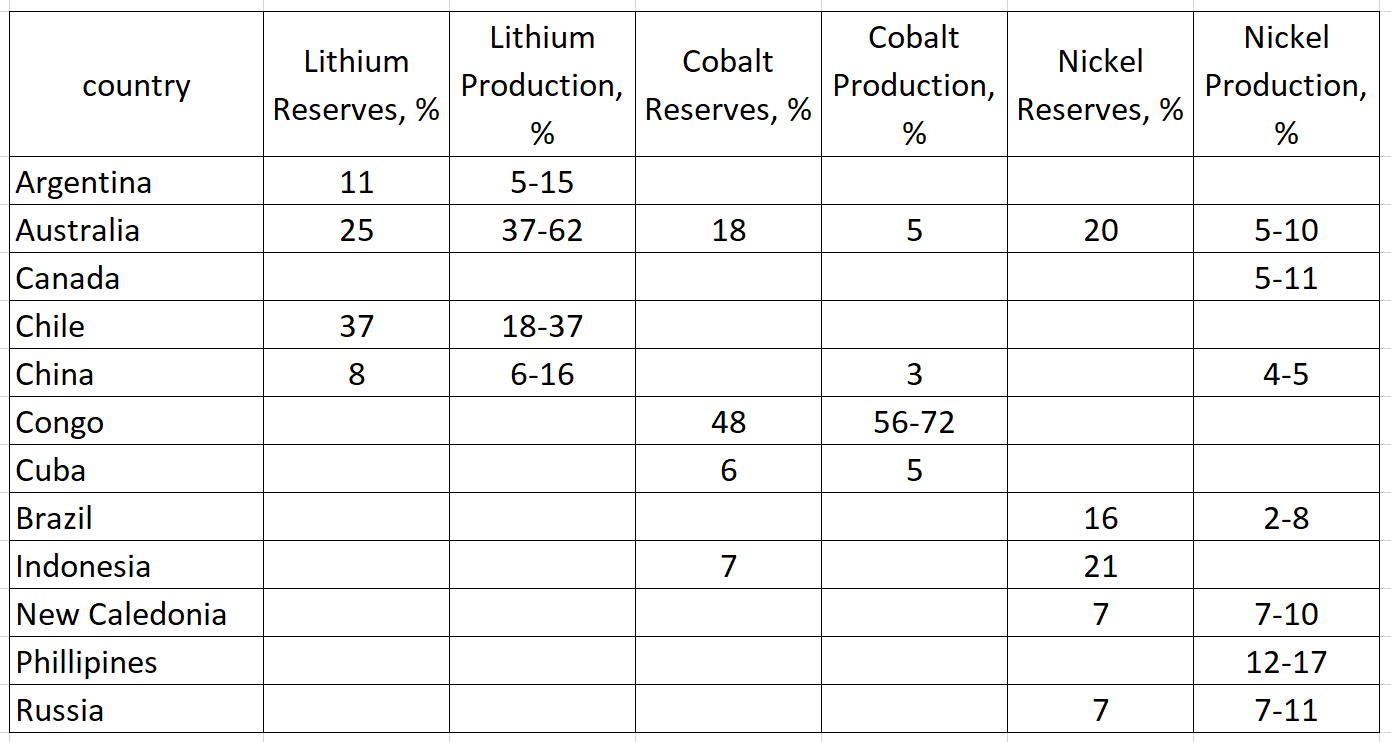
Geographic distribution of critical minerals for Li-ion batteries.

The electric vehicle battery accounts for 30–40% of the value of the vehicle. Around one-third of the battery's weight is the housing and cooling system. The cathode makes up another 20% and the anode another 10%.

Three types of batteries dominate the electric vehicle market. They are usually defined by the cathode material they contain: nickel-cobalt-manganese oxides (NMC), nickel-cobalt-aluminum oxide (NCA), and lithium iron phosphate (LFP). LFP has become widely used in China in the 2020s, while in most other countries NMC and NCA are currently dominant.

Securing the supply chain for these materials is a major world economic issue. It has been estimated that battery recycling can provide up to 60% of market demand for the three critical elements. Recycling and advancement in battery technology are proposed strategies to reduce demand for raw materials. Recycling lithium-ion batteries in particular reduces energy consumption. Supply chain issues could create bottlenecks, increase costs of EVs and slow their uptake. Nations set up incentives for domestic growth in the market, to further secure their stake in the supply chain.

Deposits of critical minerals are concentrated in a small number of countries, mostly in the Global South. Mining these deposits presents dangers to nearby communities because of weak regulation, corruption, and environmental degradation. The mining impacts the quality of the food and water local communities depend upon, and the metals end up in their bodies. Miners also experience low pay, dangerous conditions, and violent treatment. Electric vehicles require more of these critical minerals than most cars, amplifying these effects. These communities face human rights violations, environmental justice issues, problems with child labour, and potentially generational legacies of contamination from mining activities. Environmental justice issues arising from the supply chain affect the entire globe, through depredation of the atmosphere from pollution byproduct. Manufacture of battery technology is largely dominated by China. However, burning less petroleum products in vehicles can reduce the environmental impact of the petroleum industry because, as of 2023, most petroleum is used in vehicles.

The battery supply chain includes:

Upstream activities include mining for required raw materials, which include critical materials such as cobalt, lithium, nickel, manganese, and graphite as well as other required minerals such as copper.

Midstream activities include refining and smelting of raw mineral ores with heat or chemical treatment to achieve the high-purity materials required for batteries, as well as the manufacture of cathodes and anodes for battery cells. Lower environmental impacts for refining can be achieved by decarbonized electricity generation, automated process control, exhaust gas cleaning, and recycling used electrolytes.

Downstream activities include manufacturing of the batteries and end goods for the consumer. The production of lithium batteries in China has nearly three times higher emissions than the US because electricity generation in China relies more on coal.

End of life activities include recycling or recovery of materials when possible.

Disposal of spent LIBs without recycling could be detrimental to the environment. Recycling lithium-ion batteries reduces energy consumption, reduces greenhouse gas emissions, and results in 51.3% natural resource savings when compared to discarding them in landfills. Recycling can potentially lower the overall energy emissions of battery production as the LIB recycling industry grows larger. When not recycled, the disposal of cobalt extraction involves non-sulfidic tailings, which has an impact on land use. Even in the recycling process, CO_{2} emissions are still produced, continuing to impact the environment regardless of how LIBs are disposed.

Recycling of battery minerals is limited but is expected to rise in the 2030s when there are more spent batteries. Increasing recycling would bring considerable social and environmental benefits.

=== Other components ===
Electric vehicles motors have fewer parts than internal combustion engines (ICEs). On average, a motor for an electric car has about 20 moving parts, but a comparable ICE would have 200 or more.

Some electric vehicles motors are permanent magnet motors that require rare-earth elements such as neodymium and dysprosium. Production of these materials is also dominated by China and poses environmental problems. An alternative motor is the AC induction motor, which does not use these minerals but requires additional copper.

These components also contribute to the environmental justice issues caused by the extraction of cobalt and other mineral resources, just as batteries do. Radioactive dust and mine sewage from mining for these resources contribute to environmental impacts. Another aspect of the pipeline, metal refining, contributes to the environmental impacts through production of electrolytes, electricity consumption, and used cathodes. Used Cathodes amplify the toxicity of marine ecosystems by the leaching of heavy metals during the smelting process. The result of cobalt presence in the soil is its accumulation in plants, and their fruits. High cobalt amounts accumulate in the rest of the food chain, reaching land and air animals. Effects of excess cobalt include lower animal weight gain and a higher birth mortality.

Electric vehicles require more semiconductors than internal combustion engines. Taiwan is the world's largest producer of semiconductors.

== National roles in the supply chain ==
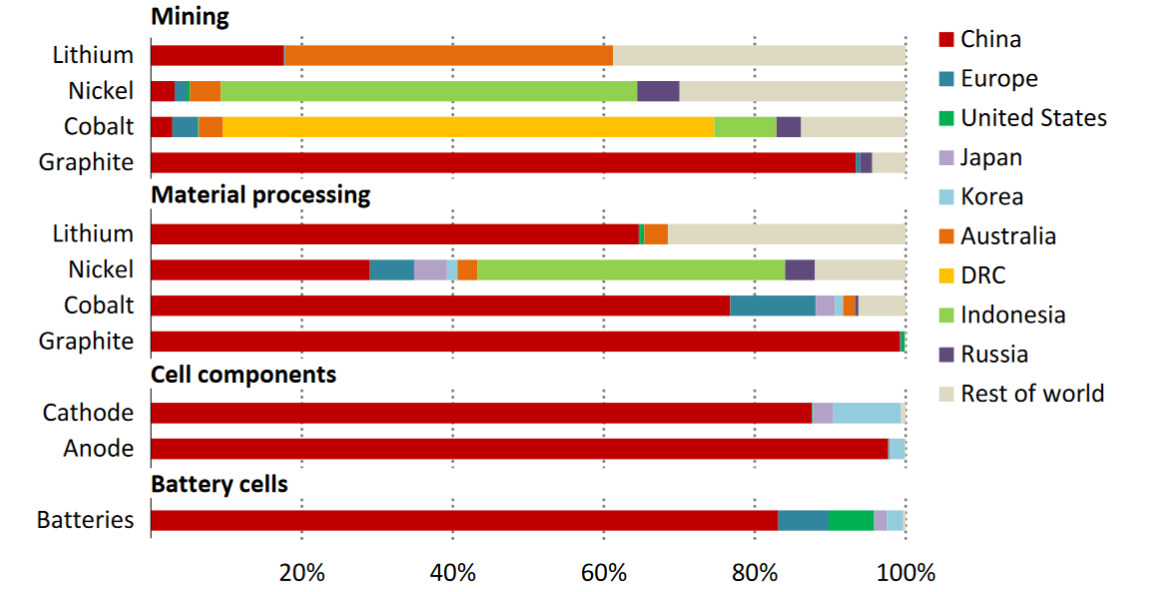
Geographical distribution of the global battery supply chain

China dominates the electric car industry, accounting for over eighty of global lithium-ion electrode and battery cell production. Refining of all major lithium-ion battery critical minerals (lithium, cobalt, nickel, manganese, graphite) takes place in China. Japan and South Korea host significant midstream cell manufacturing and downstream supply chain activities. Europe and the United States have a relatively small share of the supply chain.

In 2021, 3.3 million EVs were sold in China, up 400% from 2019 and higher than the global sales in 2020.

Upstream activities (mining and processing) largely take place in countries with extractivist economies such as Chile and the Democratic Republic of the Congo. Nickel is mined in Australia, Russia, New Caledonia and Indonesia. Cobalt is primarily mined in the Democratic Republic of the Congo as a byproduct of copper and nickel mining, with additional production in Australia, Morocco, and other copper and nickel producing countries.

In April 2024, the United States and the United Kingdom announced a ban on imports of aluminum, copper, and nickel from Russia. China is Norilsk Nickel's largest export market since 2023.

== Environmental justice issues ==
Supply chain risks include sustainability challenges, political instability and corruption in countries with mineral deposits, and human rights or environmental justice concerns. The supply of critical minerals is concentrated in a few countries: for example, the Democratic Republic of the Congo produced 74% of the world's cobalt in 2022. Extreme weather events, geopolitical issues, international trade regulation, consolidation of supply chain companies into a few large corporations, and rapidly changing technologies all present additional challenges to building a resilient supply chain. Mineral extraction in the Global South for manufacturing of batteries and vehicles consumed in the Global North may replicate historical patterns of injustice and colonialism.

Mining for nickel, copper and cobalt is causing environmental damage in developing countries such as the Philippines, Indonesia and the Democratic Republic of Congo. Nickel mining has contributed significantly to deforestation in Indonesia.

However, electric vehicles are generally better for the environment than fossil-fueled vehicles, depending on the electricity grid and battery manufacturing used. The supply chain for fossil-fueled vehicles is mostly petroleum (for a typical car around 17 tonnes of gasoline), and can be complicated and obscure. Burning less petroleum products in vehicles such as two-wheelers can reduce the environmental impact of the petroleum industry because, as of 2023, most petroleum is used in vehicles.
