= Nickel mining in Indonesia =

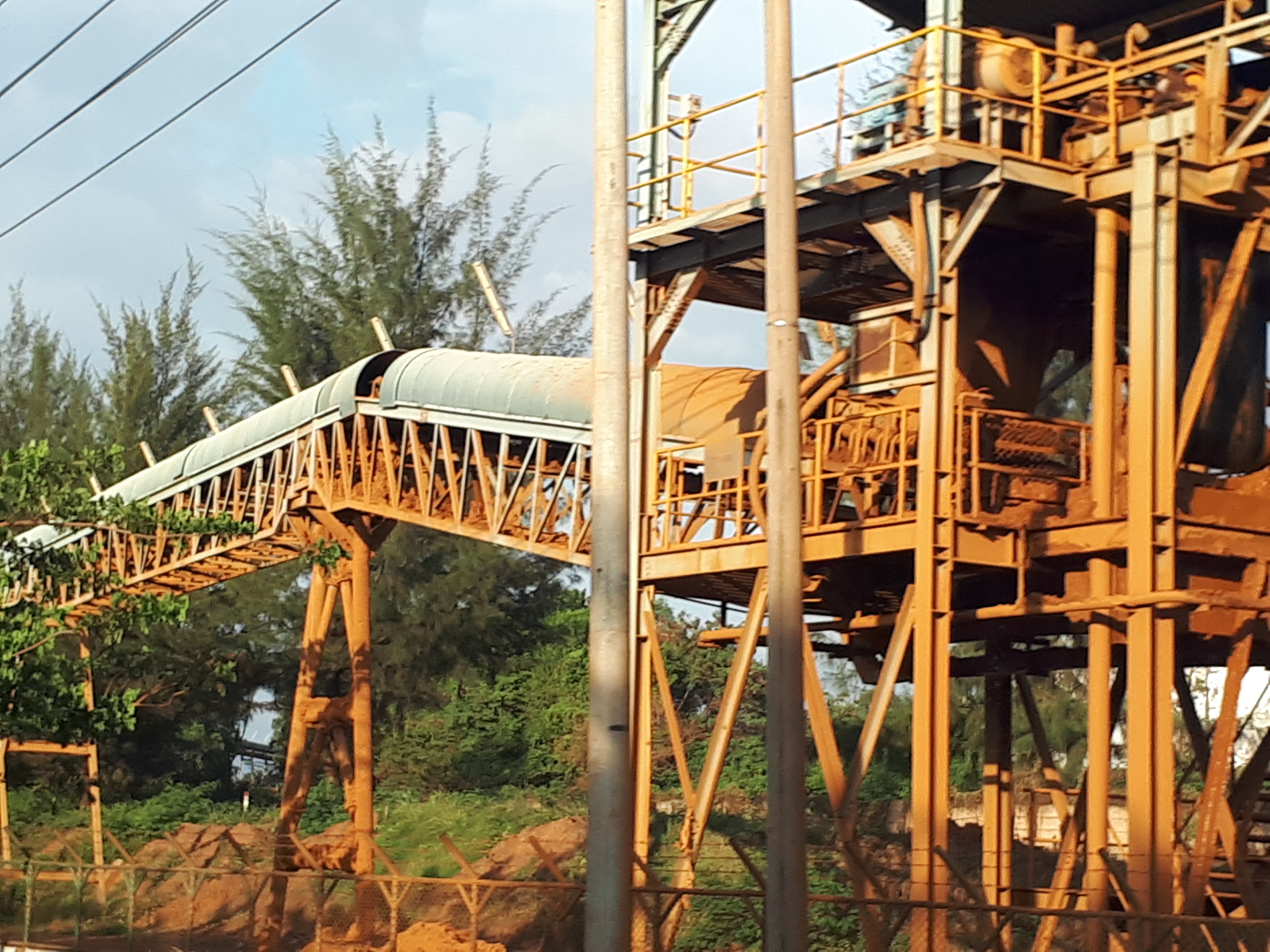
Nickel mining in Sulawesi

Nickel mining in Indonesia began with small-scale exploratory mining operations during the Dutch East Indies era and began to expand in the 1960s. Most of Indonesia's proven nickel reserves are located in the islands of Sulawesi and Halmahera, and the country has the largest annual production and reserves of nickel in the world.

== History ==
Nickel ore was first prospected in Indonesia (then known as Dutch East Indies) in 1901 in the Verbeek Mountains of Sulawesi by a Dutch mineralogist, with further discoveries in what is today Kolaka Regency in 1909. A Canadian geologist from Inco further prospected the existing deposits and in 1934 exploration efforts from a Dutch mining firm began. Initial production began in 1936 to 1941, with operations being expanded during the Japanese occupation of the Dutch East Indies. After the independence of Indonesia, the American Freeport Sulphur Company attempted to establish operations, but failed due to security concerns. NV Perto, a local company, took over operations then until it was taken over by the Indonesian government. Following the takeover, the company was restructured by the government as PN Pertambangan Nikel Indonesia in 1961. It was later merged into Aneka Tambang, which began exporting nickel ore to Japan by 1969. The International Nickel Company also began establishing metallurgical operations in the 1970s, with commercial nickel production commencing in 1978.

In January 2014, the Indonesian government announced a ban on the export of a range of mineral ores, including nickel, in an attempt to develop local smelter industries. The ban was rolled back in 2017, with the Indonesian government initially noting that mining companies would be permitted to export ore until 2022, but in 2019, the deadline was moved back to January 2020. Government minister Luhut Binsar Pandjaitan stated that the government intended for Indonesian firms to enter the supply chain for lithium batteries - which utilizes nickel in its production. The ban's announcement resulted in the world nickel price jumping by 8.8% to its highest in five years.

In April 2020, a regulation to set a minimum price of nickel was issued, effective in 13 May. The regulation was requested by the Indonesian Nickel Miners Association (APNI) to protect small miners. It was criticized by a representative of the Processing and Smelting Companies Association (AP3I) for limiting the ability to adjust for fluctuations in price. In June 2020, 20% of Vale Indonesia was acquired by Mind Id, a state-owned mining holding company, for $390 million.

In 2024, nickel mining and processing was one of the main causes of deforestation in Indonesia.

== Production ==
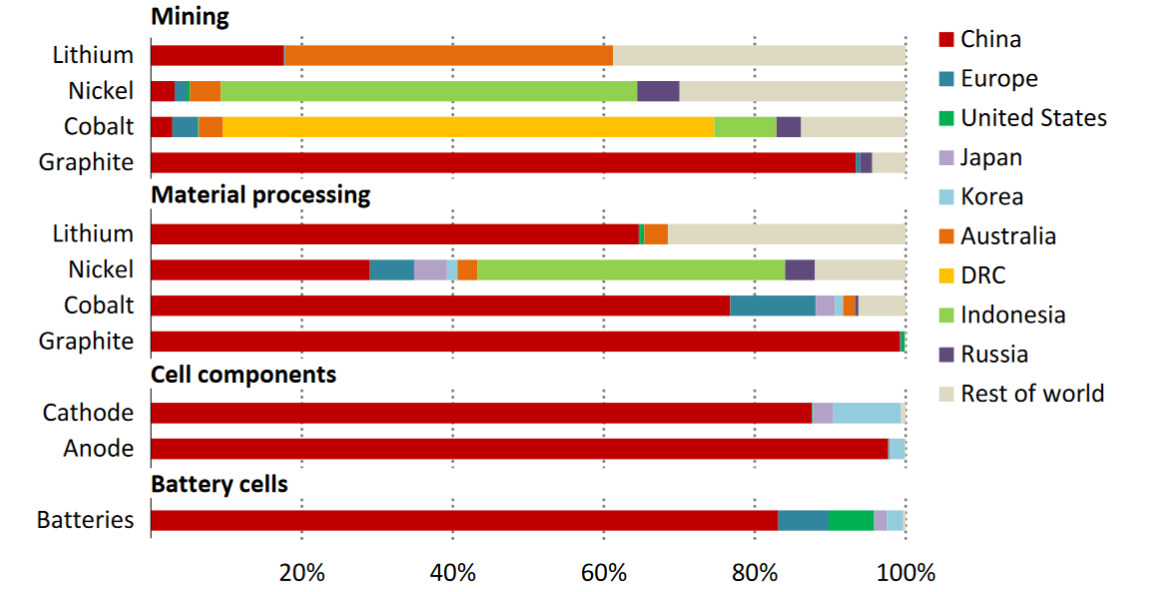
Geographical distribution of the global battery supply chain in 2024

Indonesia is the largest nickel producer in the world, with around 1.6 million tonnes of nickel produced in 2022, up from 1.04 million tonnes in 2021. In comparison, total global production of nickel in 2022 was around 3.3 million tonnes. Nickel production in Indonesia is primarily conducted by Vale's PT Vale Indonesia and Aneka Tambang, whose combined employment was 5,820 people in 2017, not accounting for jobs related to processing and in metallurgical industries such as the 43,000 employees at Morowali Industrial Park. In 2020, production is expected to drop due to the export ban. Additionally, Indonesia also produces cobalt as a byproduct of nickel mining, with 9,500 tonnes of cobalt or 5 percent of global production in 2022, making the country the world's second largest cobalt producer behind the Democratic Republic of the Congo.

The largest production sites for nickel are located in the provinces of South Sulawesi, Southeast Sulawesi, Central Sulawesi and North Maluku. Outside of the mentioned provinces, there are also nickel mines operating in Paser Regency (East Kalimantan), Raja Ampat Regency (West Papua) and in West Seram Regency (Maluku). Further reserves in Papua has also been explored.

On 28 December 2021, Indonesia unveiled a new nickel smelter in North Morowali Regency of Central Sulawesi. It has been equipped to process 13 million tons of nickel ore annually. Indonesian President Joko Widodo said that the new ferronickel-producing smelter is expected to increase the nickel ore’s value by 1400%. The largest concentrations of nickel processing in the country are located at the Morowali Industrial Park in North Morowali and the Weda Bay Industrial Park in Halmahera.

== Reserves ==
The most important Indonesian nickel ores are lateritic, primarily located in Sulawesi and Halmahera with mining operations centered at ultramafic rock outcrops. While the lateritic nickel ores are more difficult to smelt compared to nickel sulfide ores, it is more extractable due to its location on the surface. In 2019, it was reported that Indonesia possessed proven reserves of 698 million tonnes of nickel ore, with a potential 2.8 billion tonnes when accounting for unproven reserves. The United States Geological Service reported Indonesia's nickel reserves to be 21 million tonnes, compared to the global reserve of ~100 million tonnes in 2023. Indonesia's laterite deposits are estimated to comprise 15 percent of the global reserves.
