= The Democratic Republic of the Congo and the World Bank =

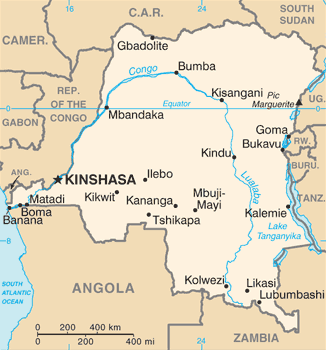
Location of the Democratic Republic of the Congo

The World Bank Group is a family of five international organizations, which has continuously given leverage loans and financial assistance to developing nations, including the Democratic Republic of the Congo, commonly known as the DRC. The country has received support from the World Bank through various social and economic development programs aiming at promoting sustainable development, conflict prevention strategies, investment in education, and efforts to address environmental degradation.

The DRC has an abundance of natural resources, such as minerals, human capital, water and livestock. Primarily due to this abundance, the World Bank sees the DRC as a developing nation with a high possibility for economic growth, to the benefit of not only the country but potentially the entirety of the African continent. Over the years, the DRC has shown signs of economic progress, including efforts to improve security, expand the economy, and initiate democratic governance. However, significant challenges such as poverty and conflict remain. While the country suffers from an ongoing conflict, the DRC has made considerable efforts to unify their army.

However, despite its advancing economy, the DRC consistently shows a low Gross National Income (GNI) per capita and Economic Vulnerability Index (EVI) due to internal conflicts that began in the 1990s. These conflicts have created many obstacles to economic development, including internal protests, violence stemming from rebel groups, inability to sustain economic growth, political instability, weak governance, and deforestation.

== Projects and Alliances ==
The World Bank has an investment portfolio for the Democratic Republic of the Congo that includes 29 active projects totaling US$3.8 billion in association with the International Development Association (IDA), the International Finance Corporation (IFC), and the Multilateral Investment Guarantee Agency (MIGA). The portfolio is divided among various sectors, with 63% allocated for infrastructure, 16% for human development, 15% for development of the private sector and agriculture, and 6% for governance and mining projects.

The DRC's Country Assistance Strategy (CAS), implemented by the World Bank, aimed to help the country reach Millennium Development Goals (MDGs) and increase growth rates. This program came to a halt in 2017 and has been subjected to further review for noncompliance. As of 2018, the World Bank is developing a new country partnership framework, where implementation is expected between the years of 2019 and 2021.

Between 1992 and 1994, the World Bank suspended aid to the DRC, citing corruption concerns amid broader socio-political instability in the country. In collaboration with the UN, there has been significant progress in demobilizing combatants, raising education, and increasing health. Other alliances with UNICEF and USAID have helped in the protection of children's human rights. Unfortunately, the DRC still has a score of just 0.37 out of 1 on the World Bank's human capital index scale, which uses key determinants to calculate a child's chance of survival and overall success.

=== IDA ===
The International Development Association (IDA) has awarded over US$3.7 million in credits and approximately US$5.5 million in grants to the DRC over the course of their relationship. As of 2018, a little over US$1 million in credit and US$2.7 million in grants is currently being disbursed. The current credits (loans) and grants are financing projects that help with development, infrastructure, environmental rehabilitation, raising education levels, and increasing women's rights, among other areas.

=== IFC ===
The International Finance Corporation's (IFC) investments amount to over US$429 million, which funds projects committed to the development of the DRC. The IFC has eight active projects that primarily focus on the manufacturing sector by expanding access to financing. The IFC is assisting the DRC to improve the business environment, including easing the process of obtaining permits, starting businesses, and paying taxes. Additionally, the IFC created the Conflict-Affected States in Africa (CASA) initiative to suggest methods of improving the DRC's overall investments and increasing support for small businesses. The IFC has primarily partnered with the World Bank in order to encourage further investments in the DRC. The IFC also works with the Organization for the harmonization in Africa of Business Law (OHADA) in order to induce further economic growth. Management training programs have been offered by the IFC, which have helped in the growth of local, small businesses.

=== MIGA ===
As of late 2018, the Multilateral Investment Guarantee Agency (MIGA) has not made any guarantees to the DRC. Prior contributions have helped the DRC to build its infrastructure and rehabilitate its private sector. Between 2009 and 2016, MIGA contributed more than US$187 million worth of guarantees to the country. Most projects focused on securing shareholder loans and building infrastructure to attract foreign investment, while aiming to address challenges like environmental degradation and infrastructure gaps. This has the potential to help in addressing the degradation of roads and infrastructure in the country caused by past and current conflict.

== Reception ==
The World Bank's involvement in the DRC has been highly controversial. This controversy is due in part to the problems that remain despite the DRC receiving loans for development since the 1960s, with brief periods during which the World Bank suspended relations.

=== Successful projects ===
The World Bank has helped to promote foreign investment in the DRC. It created the National Investment Promotion Agency (ANAPI), which provided investors with information, advisory services, and potential tax benefits. Foreign direct investment in the DRC increased significantly from US$72 million in 2000 to US$1.3 billion in 2017, peaking at US$3.3 billion in 2013. However, the distribution of these investments' benefits across the population remains a concern.

With the help of the World Bank, the DRC has seen an improvement in access to healthcare. The DRC is highly dependent on aid to fund its health services, of which the World Bank contributes 25%. Some sources attribute the increase in child immunization rates from 5% to 81% to the World Bank's role as the second-largest contributor to health service funding in the DRC.

=== Criticism ===
Despite the World Bank's funding of its health system, the DRC has been affected by the ongoing Ebola outbreak which began in 2018, which has been difficult to contain. Additionally, 64% of the DRC's population still lives below the poverty line. Despite the World Bank's ongoing interventions, the DRC continues to face significant challenges, including corruption, gender violence, unemployment, low GDP, and economic stagnation, indicating the complexity of achieving sustainable development.

Critics have raised concerns about the focus of World Bank projects, arguing that large-scale initiatives, such as dam construction, may prioritize industrial and urban needs over rural electrification. An article in The Guardian reported on a purported strategic plan suggesting the World Bank prioritizes large-scale infrastructure projects over smaller-scale initiatives, potentially limiting rural electrification efforts.

Other critics have commented that the World Bank fails to account for historical precedence when attempting to influence government. An example of this issue occurred in 2001 when the World Bank attempted to attract FDI by restructuring one of the largest mining companies that were located in the Katanga province, known as the Gécamines. This action led to the laying off of 10,000 workers, and has been claimed to have caused regional and ethnic conflicts.

== See also ==
- Social issues in the Democratic Republic of Congo
- Foreign relations of the Democratic Republic of the Congo
