= Economy of Sulawesi =

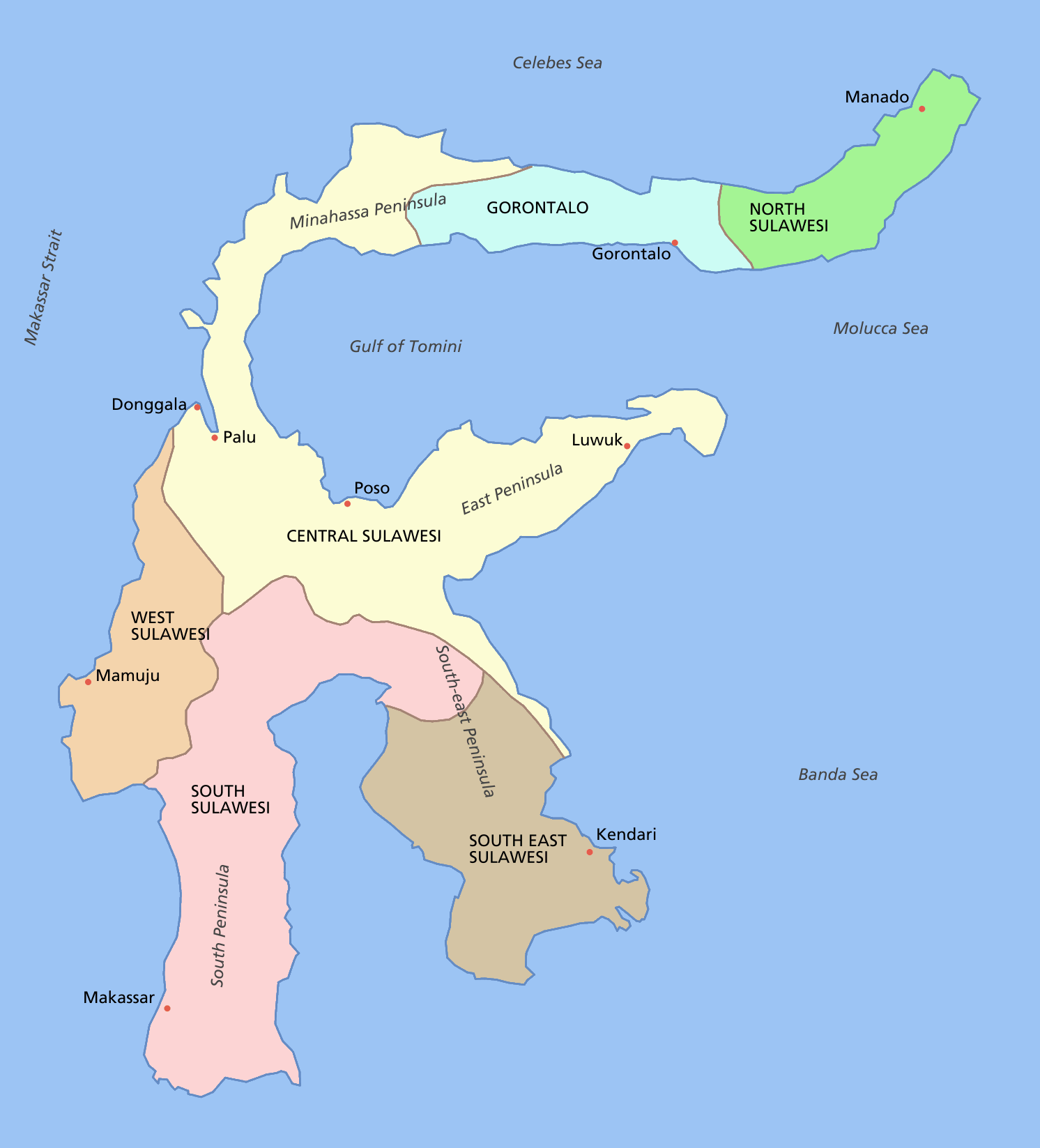
Map of the six provinces constituting the island of Sulawesi. Of the provinces, South Sulawesi (pink) and North Sulawesi (green) are cited as the major economic hubs on the island.

A growing population and abundant natural resources contribute to the wealth of the island of Sulawesi in Indonesia, while terrain and under-developed infrastructure limits economic growth.

== Description ==
Sulawesi is one of the Greater Sunda Islands and the eleventh largest island in the world. The island is divided into six provinces; Gorontalo, Central Sulawesi, North Sulawesi, South Sulawesi, Southeast Sulawesi, and West Sulawesi.

The geography of the island varies from region to region. The northern provinces are mountainous, while the southern provinces are lower-laying. Many provinces contain outlying islands which exhibit different economic conditions than the main island. Most economic activity on Sulawesi is conducted on a small scale, with the only notable concentrations of organized industry on the island being in Southern Sulawesi. The geography of the island disadvantages the development of industry, as much of the island's population is localized in small areas, driving up construction and labor costs.

The majority of economic activity on Sulawesi is related to resource extraction, including mining, forestry, and the harvesting of other valuable natural resources. Agriculture and fishing are also major sectors of the economy. Economic activity varies from region to region, with most economic activity being centered in Southern Sulawesi and parts of Northern Sulawesi. The economic hub of the island is the province of South Sulawesi, which has the largest population of any of Sulawesi's constituent provinces and is the location of the largest city on the island, Makassar. Infrastructure on the island is sparse and limits economic development, with only Makassar having developed infrastructure. Efforts to improve the island's infrastructure are ongoing, notably the construction of a new port and train line in Makassar in the late 2010s. In 2019 efforts began to establish a special economic zone in North Sulawesi, though some locals have objected that these projects are destroying local communities and industries.

== Economic activity ==
=== Agriculture ===
Agriculture is a major component of the economy of Sulawesi and employs more people than any other economic sector—according to one 2016 source, 30–40% of Sulawesi's constituent provinces' GDP is tied to agriculture. Most agriculture on the island is done on a local scale on family-owned plots, though as of the early 2010s more farmers were beginning to grow cash crops in place of the traditional rice. Crops vary by region; in the mountainous north, tree crops such as cloves, coconut, and nutmeg are grown, while in the flatter south, commercial crops such as cocoa, tobacco, sugar, and rice are grown. Cattle also contribute to the economy of Southern Sulawesi.

Despite its large contribution to the economy of the island, the agricultural sector was growing slower than the Indonesian national average as of 2016. Most agricultural production is highly localized and is done on small plots of land.

=== Resource extraction ===
A large part of the Sulawesi economy is based around resource extraction, most notably mining, forestry, and fishing. Being an island, Sulawesi has an extensive coastline and many of its inhabitants are involved in the fishing industry.

Mining, quarrying, and other forms of mineral extraction contribute to economic activity in the island; as with other sectors of the economy, these industries are primarily concentrated in Northern and Southern Sulawesi. Northern Sulawesi has rich copper deposits and has recently invested in building nickel smelters. Chinese conglomerates Tsingshan Holding Group and Huafon Group plan to invest heavily in the island's nickel, aluminum, and chemical industries.

==== Nickel mining ====
In the late 2010s and early 2020s, the international mining industry has taken an increasing interest the Morowali Regency (located in the province of Central Sulawesi) and the region's high-quality nickel reserves - vital for the production of lithium batteries. Indonesia banned the export of nickel ore in 2014, forcing international companies to refine the ore in Indonesia and thereby increase downstream investment in Indonesian companies. The thriving nickel industry in Morowali (such as at the Morowali Industrial Park) has resulted in a large increase in the region's GDP (one source notes a 300% increase between 2013 and 2019), but the expansion of the extraction industry has also caused environmental degradation. As of 2021, the largest foreign investors were American, Brazilian, Chinese, and Japanese companies, while the government of Indonesia is attempting to build a domestic battery industry.
