= List of incumbent regional heads and deputy regional heads in Central Sulawesi =

The following is an article about the list of Regional Heads and Deputy Regional Heads in 13 regencies/cities in Central Sulawesi who are currently still serving.

== List ==
Regency/ City	Photo of the Regent/ Mayor	Regent/ Mayor	Photo of Deputy Regent/ Mayor	Deputy Regent/ Mayor	Taking Office	End of Office (Planned)	Ref.
Banggai; Regency List of Regents/Deputy Regents		Amirudin Tamoreka		Furqanuddin Masulili	2 June 2025	2 June 2030	
Banggai Islands; Regency List of Regents/Deputy Regents		Rusli Moidady		Serfi Kambey	20 February 2025	20 February 2030	
Banggai Sea; Regency List of Regents/Deputy Regents		Sofyan Kaepa		Ablit	20 February 2025	20 February 2030	
Buol; Regency List of Regents/Deputy Regents		Risharyudi Triwibowo		Mohammad Nasir Dj. Daimaroto	20 February 2025	20 February 2030	
Donggala; Regency List of Regents/Deputy Regents		Vera Elena Laruni		Taufik Muhammad Burhan	20 February 2025	20 February 2030	
Morowali; Regency List of Regents/Deputy Regents		Iksan Baharudin Abdul Rauf		Iriane Iliyas	20 February 2025	20 February 2030	
North Morowali; Regency List of Regents/Deputy Regents		Delis Julkarson Hehi		Djira K.	20 February 2025	20 February 2030	
Parigi Moutong; Regency List of Regents/Deputy Regents		Erwin Burase		Abdul Sahid	2 June 2025	2 June 2030	
Poso; Regency List of Regents/Deputy Regents		Verna Gladies Merry Inkiriwang		Soeharto Kandar	20 February 2025	20 February 2030	
Sigi; Regency List of Regents/Deputy Regents		Mohammad Rizal Intjenae		Samuel Yansen Pongi	20 February 2025	20 February 2030	
Tojo Una-Una; Regency List of Regents/Deputy Regents		Ilham S. Lawidu		Surya	20 February 2025	20 February 2030	
Tolitoli; Regency List of Regents/Deputy Regents		Amran Hi. Yahya		Mohammad Besar Bantilan	20 February 2025	20 February 2030	
Palu; City List of Mayors/Deputy mayors		Hadianto Rasyid		Imelda Liliana Muhidin	20 February 2025	20 February 2030	

Notes

- "Commencement of office" is the inauguration date at the beginning or during the current term of office. For acting regents/mayors, it is the date of appointment or extension as acting regent/mayor.
- Based on the Constitutional Court decision Number 27/PUU-XXII/2024, the Governor and Deputy Governor, Regent and Deputy Regent, and Mayor and Deputy Mayor elected in 2020 shall serve until the inauguration of the Governor and Deputy Governor, Regent and Deputy Regent, and Mayor and Deputy Mayor elected in the 2024 national simultaneous elections as long as the term of office does not exceed 5 (five) years.

== See also ==
- Central Sulawesi
