= Kingdom of Mori =

Historical kingdom in Indonesia

- c. 1580–1907
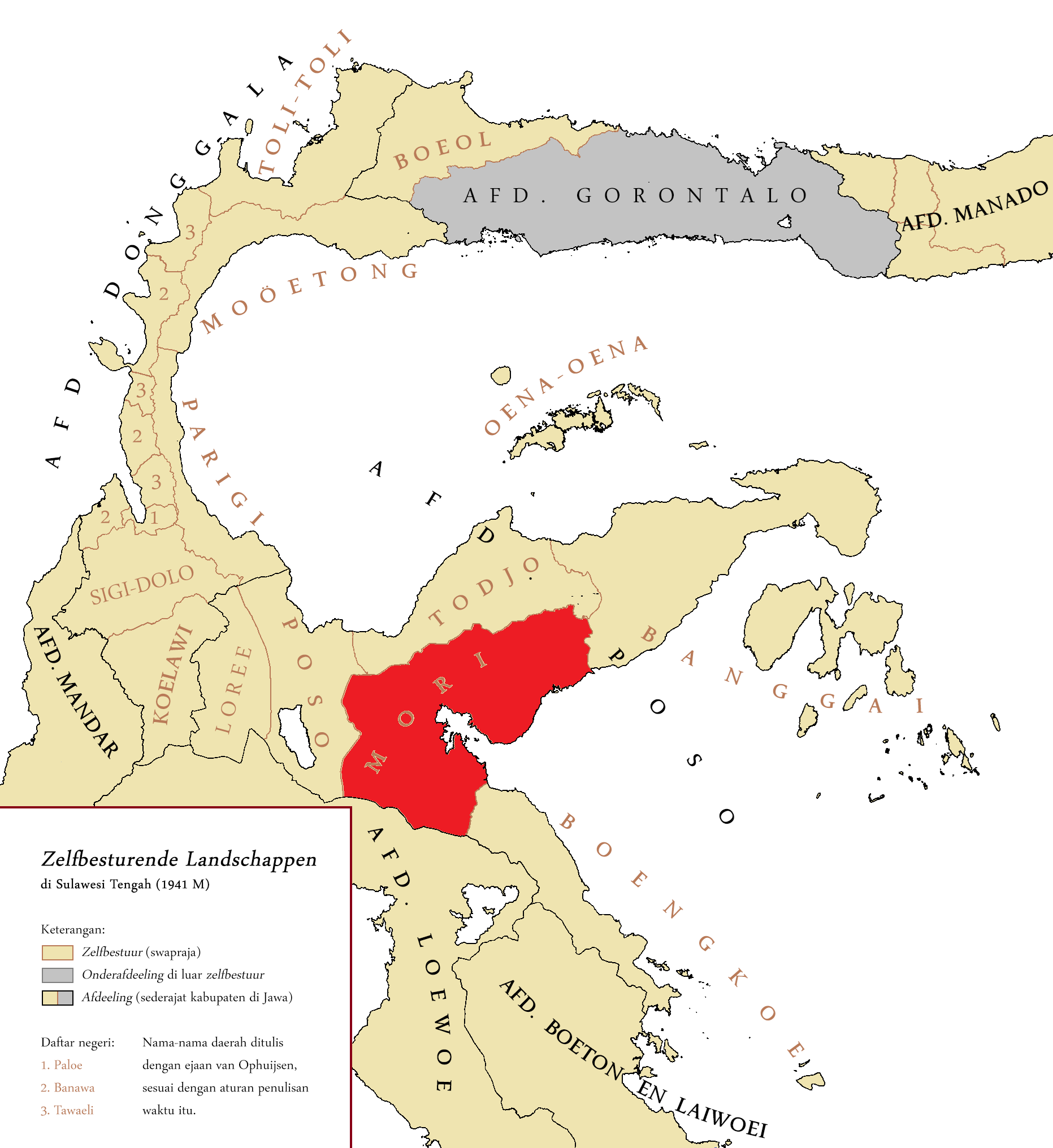
- Mori (in red) with other native polities in Central Sulawesi, 1941.
- Capital: Kolonodale
- Religion: Native religion; then Christianity
- Government: Monarchy
- History
  - Established: c. 1580
  - Disestablished: 1907

Area
- 10,000 km^{2} (3,900 sq mi)
Succeeded by
Dutch East Indies
- Today part of: Indonesia

The Kingdom of Mori, also known as Tomori or Wita Mori, was a polity largely corresponding to the present-day North Morowali Regency in Central Sulawesi, Indonesia, which existed from the late sixteenth century to the early twentieth century. It remained as a largely independent polity throughout most of its history, being a more agricultural inland polity in contrast to its maritime-oriented neighbors. In 1907, it was annexed into the Dutch East Indies following a punitive expedition which saw Mori's ruler killed in combat.

== Geography ==
The polity is located around the Gulf of Tolo, at the intersection of Sulawesi's East and Southeast Peninsulas. It covered what is today North Morowali Regency, which has an area of around 10,000 square kilometres (3,900 sq mi). To its north, it borders the Poso polity, and to the west were several tribes under Poso's influence. To its south was the Bungku polity. The territory is drained by several small rivers, principally the Laa and Tambalako Rivers.

== History ==
=== Origins ===
Historian Edward Poelinggomang estimated based on oral accounts that the first raja of Mori, Marunduh I, ruled from around 1580 to 1620. Mori's origin myth described a migrating group which settled near a sago swamp, establishing the settlement of Ligisa. The myth also described a man with supernatural origins emerging from a bamboo shoot which was granted rule (mokole) over the Ligisa settlement after marrying its chief's daughter. After repelling another tribe's attack, the group moved to the settlement of Wawontuko, establishing the Mori polity.

The polity was attacked by the Kingdom of Luwu during the reign of its third raja, around 1670, and after his capture the raja and the polity's heir became a prisoner at Palopo. The heir agreed to pay an annual tribute to Luwu in exchange for his return, but during his capture a new raja had been chosen at Mori. At the end, Mori did not pay any annual tribute, and the heir did not initially return to Mori. Due to infighting at Wawontuko, the heir eventually became raja, but moved his court to another settlement of Pa'antoule to bypass his agreement with Luwu.

=== Colonial period ===
European colonial authorities remained largely unaware of Mori until the nineteenth century. During the 1840s, Mori engaged in a conflict with its southern neighbor the Bungku. In 1853, the Dutch East Indies government announced the formal annexation of the Sultanate of Ternate, which included Ternatean vassals in Sulawesi's East Coast such as Bungku and Banggai. The Mori, which had not sworn fealty to Ternate, refused to acknowledge Dutch suzerainty. In response to this, and to continued Mori attacks on Bungku, the Dutch launched an expedition in 1856 which took a Mori fortification and reduced Mori raids into Bungku, but did not stop the conflict between Mori and Bungku. By 1859, the Bungku had agreed to pay tribute to the Mori. After negotiations mediated by Dutch missionaries, Mori and Bungku agreed to another peace agreement in 1900 which defined the two's borders.

Starting in 1905, the Dutch colonial government made renewed efforts to fully conquer Sulawesi, subduing the states of Bone, Luwu, and Wajo in a series of expeditions. In 1906, the Mori raja agreed to provide a labor force to construct a Dutch outpost in Kolonodale, but following an incident caused by a Dutch infantry platoon, the Mori mobilized and massacred the platoon on 19 July 1907, along with another group on 21 July. In total, 34 KNIL soldiers and 10 KNIL workers were killed in the incidents. The Dutch sent a punitive expedition in response, which defeated the Mori forces in an assault which resulted in the Mori ruler Marunduh Datu ri Tana being killed in action on 17 August 1907. Mori was annexed into the Dutch East Indies, and its administration was merged with that of Bungku as part of the onderafdeling of Sulawesi's east coast.

The Mori polity remained within the onderafdeling as an autonomous region, with the Dutch appointing one of the Mori chieftains as the new raja. In 1923, the raja moved to Kolonodale where a small palace was built for him. This arrangement was largely retained during the brief Japanese occupation period, and under the State of East Indonesia. Upon the death of the Mori raja on 18 May 1950, no successor would be appointed.

== Economy and demographics ==
Mori's economy was largely agricultural, with less engagement in maritime trade compared to its neighbors such as Bungku, Banggai, or Buton. The Mori ruler received tribute from subjects primarily in the form of rice, sago, and carabaos, with local chiefs owning swaths of sago swamps. They also engaged in trade, exporting agricultural produce and products from iron ore found in the region. Local craftsmen also produced copper jewelry, pottery, and iron weapons for export. By the nineteenth century, there was also a significant export of forest products such as rattan and dammar. The Mori chiefs and raja levied a tax on these exports, and Kruyt estimated the raja's earnings from this source at 1,000 fl annually. In 1847, following a colonial government policy of free trade, there was an increase in the amount of trading activity in the region which boosted this export.

Dutch ethnographer Albert Christian Kruyt, visiting the area around 1900, classified the polity's population as "Upper" Mori and "Lower" Mori, inhabiting the highlands and the coastal plains respectively. There were also other native non-Mori tribes within the polity, some being treated as conquered peoples while some were treated as an integral part of the polity. During Kruyt's visit, the Mori Raja estimated that 4,000 fighting-age males lived within the Mori polity. In the 1840s, Dutch reports estimated Mori's population at between 35 and 40 thousand people.

== Legacy ==
There have been proposals to make raja Marunduh Datu ri Tana, who was killed in the 1907 Dutch expedition, a National Hero of Indonesia. The Mori palace in Kolonodale is today a designated cultural property of Indonesia.

== Sources ==
- Poelinggomang, Edward L. (2023). Kerajaan Mori: Sejarah dari Sulawesi Tengah (in Indonesian) (2nd ed.). Jakarta: Komunitas Bambu. ISBN 978-979-3731-30-8.
- Velthoen, Esther Joy (2002). Contested Coastlines: Diasporas, Trade and Colonial Expansion in Eastern Sulawesi 1680-1905 (PDF) (PhD thesis). Perth: Murdoch University.
