= Suhaniah fruit bat =

Conservation status
- Least Concern (IUCN 3.1)

Scientific classification
- Kingdom: Animalia
- Phylum: Chordata
- Class: Mammalia
- Order: Chiroptera
- Family: Pteropodidae
- Genus: Thoopterus
- Species: T. suhaniahae

Binomial name
- Thoopterus suhaniahae Maryanto, Yani, Prijono & Wiantoro, 2012

Species of mammal

The Suhaniah fruit bat (Thoopterus suhaniahae) is a species of megabat in the family Pteropodidae. It is native to Indonesia and was described in 2012.

== Taxonomy ==
The Suhaniah fruit bat was described as a new species in 2012. The holotype had been collected in Lore Lindu National Park on the Indonesian island Sulawesi in 2000 by I. Maryanto and M. Yani. Before its description, the genus Thoopterus was believed to be monotypic, consisting only of the swift fruit bat (Thoopterus nigrescens). Scientists subsequently discovered that there was regional variation in the swift fruit bat: individuals in northern Sulawesi were smaller than those in southwest Sulawesi. The southwest Sulawesi population was split from T. nigrescens due to larger body size, skull size, and jaw size, and given the scientific name Thoopterus suhaniahae. The eponym for the species name suhaniahae is Suhaniah, the wife of Mohamad Yani.

== Description ==
The Suhaniah fruit bat is sexually dimorphic, with males larger than females on average. Males have a head and body length of 89.3–109.7 mm (3.52–4.32 in), compared to females at 86.0–101.1 mm (3.39–3.98 in). Males have forearm lengths of 74.4–81.8 mm (2.93–3.22 in), with female forearm lengths of 73.0–78.5 mm (2.87–3.09 in).

== Distribution ==
The Suhaniah fruit bat is endemic to Indonesia, where it is found on Sulawesi, Wawonii Island, and the Talaud Islands. It is found at a range of elevations from 0–2,100 m (0–6,890 ft) above sea level. Its range includes lowland and montane forests.
