= Maleo Airport =

Maleo Airport Bandar Udara Maleo
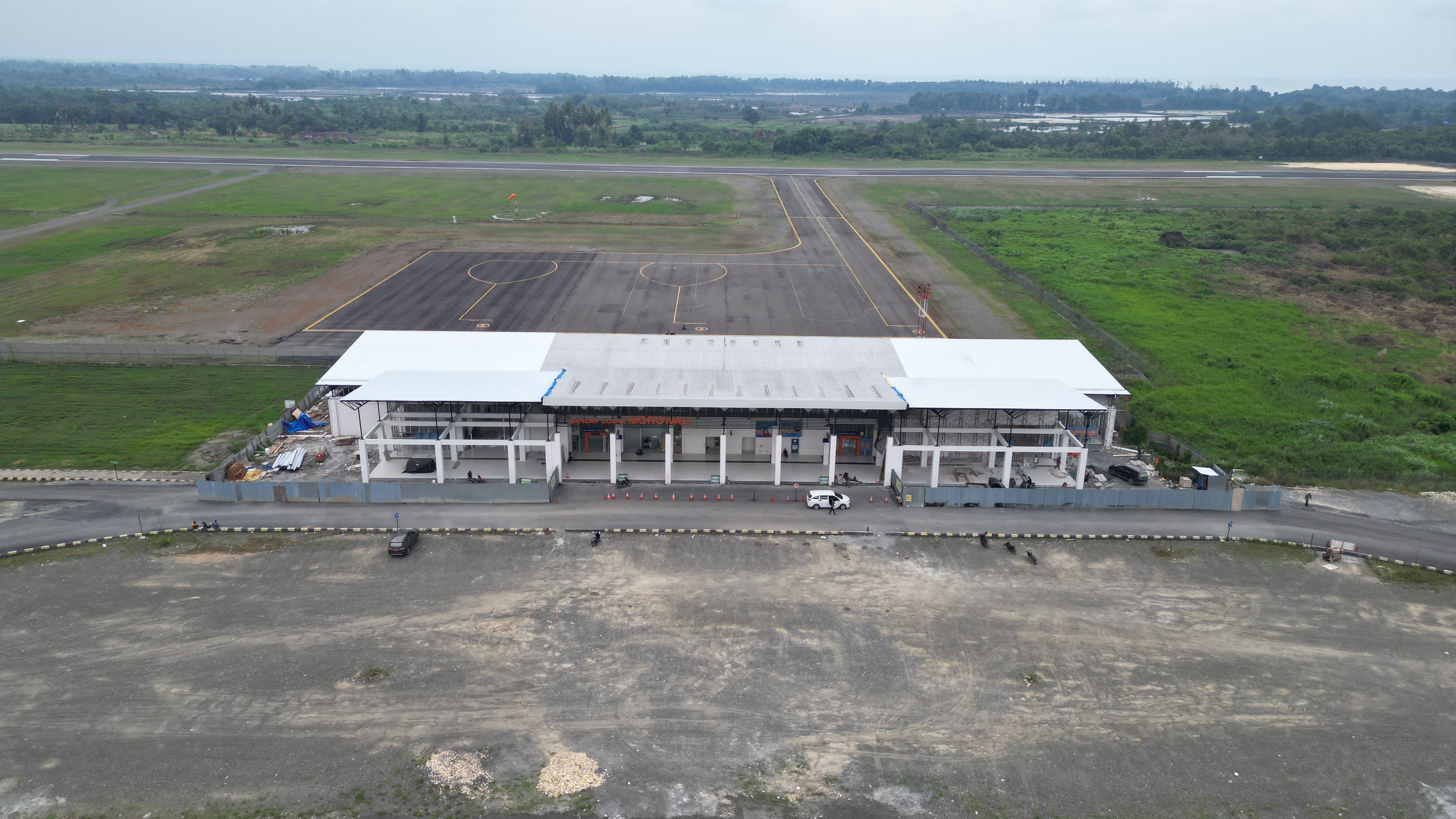
- IATA: MOH; ICAO: WAFO

Summary
- Airport type: Public
- Owner: Government of Indonesia
- Operator: Directorate General of Civil Aviation
- Serves: Morowali Regency
- Location: Bumiraya District, Morowali Regency, Central Sulawesi, Indonesia
- Time zone: WITA (UTC+08:00)
- Elevation AMSL: 11 m (36 ft)
- Coordinates: 2°12′12″S 121°39′37″E
- Interactive map of Maleo Airport

Runways
Direction	Length		Surface
Direction	m	ft	Surface
05/23	1,800	5,906	Asphalt

Statistics (2024)
- Passengers: 214,069 (▲10.84%)
- Cargo (tonnes): 139.48 (▲8.52%)
- Aircraft movements: 3,991 (▲8.07%)
- Source: DGCA

Maleo Airport (IATA: MOH, ICAO: WAFO), also known as Morowali Airport, is a domestic airport serving Morowali Regency in the province of Central Sulawesi, on the island of Sulawesi, Indonesia. The airport is named after the maleo, a bird species endemic to Sulawesi. The airport should not be confused with the larger, privately operated airport located farther south within the Indonesia Morowali Industrial Park (IMIP), which primarily serves workers and other special visitors to the nickel-processing complex. Located approximately 43 km (26.7 mi) from Bungku, the administrative seat of Morowali Regency, the airport serves as a major gateway to Bungku, Morowali Regency, and the surrounding areas. It offers regular flights to Makassar, the provincial capital of South Sulawesi and the largest city on Sulawesi, as well as Palu, the provincial capital of Central Sulawesi.

== History ==
=== Background and construction ===
Before the establishment of the airport, transportation to and from Morowali relied primarily on road and sea routes. Due to Morowali’s mountainous terrain and extensive limestone landscapes, overland journeys were often difficult and time-consuming. Travel from Kendari could take approximately 8–9 hours under normal conditions, provided that the roads were not affected by subsidence, landslides, or other disruptions. Meanwhile, the journey from Palu, the capital of Central Sulawesi Province, could take up to 12 hours, while travel from Makassar could take as long as 23 hours. The regency’s vast geographical area, combined with its growing economic activity, highlighted the need for a faster and more efficient air transportation facility.

Construction of Morowali Airport began in 2007 at the initiative of the Morowali Regency Government, using funding from the Regional Budget (APBD). During the initial phase, development proceeded gradually and slowly, and construction was eventually suspended. To resume development and bring the airport in line with operational and safety requirements, physical construction was taken over in 2010 by the Directorate General of Civil Aviation under the Ministry of Transportation, with funding from the national budget (APBN). This phase included the construction of airside facilities such as the runway, taxiway, and apron, as well as landside facilities including the passenger terminal and administrative buildings.

Over the following years, construction progressed despite challenges in budget disbursement and implementation. Although funding was initially released relatively slowly, development was significantly accelerated during the final three years as authorities pushed to complete the airport. By 2017, approximately Rp21 billion had been allocated from the regional budget (APBD), while spending from the national budget (APBN) amounted to approximately Rp345.591 billion. By that year, the airport’s basic facilities and major infrastructure had largely been completed, paving the way for it to meet the technical and safety requirements for flight operations and begin preparations for its official opening. On 28 August 2017, the first aircraft landed at the airport when a TransNusa ATR 42 conducted a landing, marking a significant milestone in the airport's development and its preparations for commercial operations. The airport commenced commercial operations in March 2018, although it was not officially inaugurated until 23 December 2018, when then-Indonesian President Joko Widodo formally inaugurated the facility.

The name “Maleo” was proposed and selected by the Morowali Regency government as the airport’s official name, in recognition of the maleo, an endemic bird of Sulawesi and an important symbol of Morowali in Central Sulawesi. The name also reflects the region’s local identity and its rich natural heritage.

=== Contemporary history ===
The airport is often confused with another airport in Morowali, located within the Indonesia Morowali Industrial Park (IMIP) nickel-processing complex. Located about 85 km from Maleo Airport, the IMIP airport is primarily used by IMIP workers and authorized visitors. In late 2025, controversy erupted after Defense Minister Sjafrie Sjamsoeddin stated that the airport at the IMIP complex was operating without the presence of official state authorities, such as customs and immigration officers, despite being capable of receiving international flights. He described the airport as an “anomaly” because it lacked the government agencies that would normally be present at an international aviation facility. This led some social media commentators to criticize former President Joko Widodo, accusing him of being behind the construction and inauguration of the IMIP airport. In response, Widodo clarified that he had actually inaugurated Maleo Airport, not the airport at the IMIP complex.

Major rehabilitation and expansion works at the airport were carried out between 2024 and 2025, with support and investment from Chinese companies. On 11 February 2026, following completion of the runway extension, Sriwijaya Air inaugurated a new Makassar–Morowali route operated by a Boeing 737-500, marking the first time a narrow-body aircraft had landed at the airport.

== Facilities and development ==
Maleo Airport occupies an area of approximately 158 hectares. The airport’s terminal building initially covered approximately 1,000 m² and had a passenger handling capacity of around 100 people per day. Between 2024 and 2025, the terminal was expanded to approximately 2,000 m², increasing its annual passenger handling capacity to around 194,000 passengers. The terminal was equipped with two X-ray screening units, two conveyor belts for departing and arriving baggage, and two check-in counters. Other supporting facilities included an administrative office building and an aircraft rescue and firefighting (ARFF) facility.

At the time it commenced operations, the airport had a 1,050 m × 30 m runway, an 80 m × 70 m apron, and a 192 m × 18 m taxiway. The runway was subsequently extended to 1,500 m in 2018, enabling the airport to accommodate larger turboprop aircraft such as the ATR 72, and further lengthened to 1,800 m in 2025, enabling the airport to accommodate larger narrow-body aircraft, including the Airbus A320 and Boeing 737. The extensions were carried out by Chinese company Zhenshi Holding Group as part of two corporate social responsibility (CSR) projects in Morowali Regency, representing an investment of approximately US$10 million (around Rp164 billion). In addition to the runway extension, development works at Maleo Airport included the construction of a 260 × 85 metre runway strip and a 92.5 × 65 metre Runway End Safety Area (RESA). The project also involved installing 720 metres of airside fencing, including fence-post foundations, as well as removing and replacing 62.5 meters of existing fencing.

According to the master plan, the runway is planned to be further extended to 2,200 m, with land currently being cleared in preparation for the extension. The Ministry of Transportation will also continue upgrading the airport’s facilities in the next phase. The planned improvements include strengthening the runway pavement, expanding the apron, and installing aviation navigation and visual aid facilities.

== Airlines and destinations ==
Airlines	Destinations
Sriwijaya Air	Jakarta–Soekarno-Hatta, Makassar
Wings Air	Makassar, Palu

== Statistics ==
Annual passenger numbers and aircraft statistics
Year	Passengers handled	Passenger % change	Cargo (tonnes)	Cargo % change	Aircraft movements	Aircraft % change
2018	25,851	Steady	N/A	Steady	584	Steady
2019	65,581	▲153.69	N/A	Steady	1,446	▲147.60
2020	35,222	▼46.29	3.06	Steady	858	▼40.66
2021	52,248	▲48.34	27.04	▲783.66	1,050	▲22.38
2022	126,533	▲142.18	89.69	▲231.69	2,474	▲135.62
2023	193,131	▲52.63	128.53	▲43.30	3,693	▲49.27
2024	214,069	▲10.84	139.48	▲8.52	3,991	▲8.07
Source: DGCA, BPS

== Accidents and incidents ==
- On 12 May 2023, a privately chartered Hawker 900XP carrying eight occupants—four crew members and four passengers, all Chinese nationals—departing from Jakarta’s Halim Perdanakusuma International Airport overran the runway by approximately 200 metres while landing at Maleo Airport. All occupants survived, although one crew member sustained minor injuries. The aircraft sustained some damage after striking the airport perimeter fence and was subsequently removed from the site.
