= Asrar Abdul Samad =

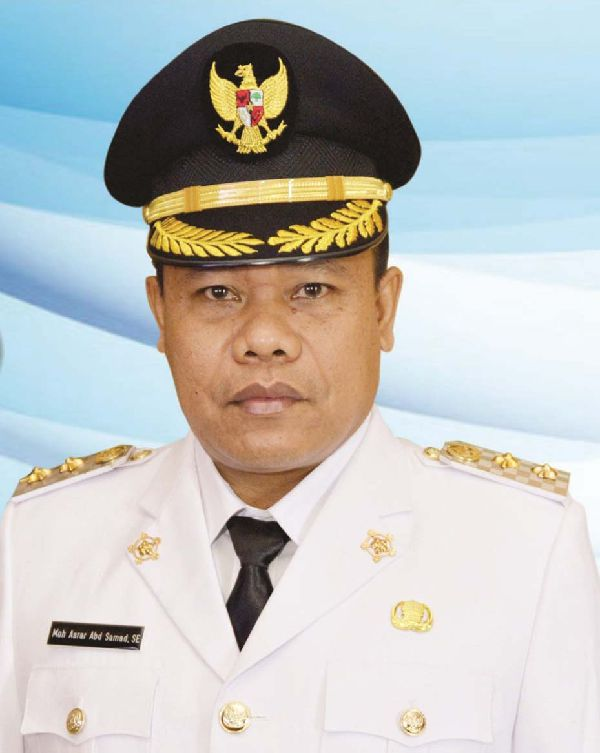
- Samad as vice regent

Regent of North Morowali
- In office 6 July 2020 – 30 April 2021; Acting since 2 April 2020
- Preceded by: Aptripel Tumimomor
- Succeeded by: Delis Julkarson Hehi

Vice Regent of North Morowali
- In office 17 February 2016 – 2 April 2020
- Preceded by: Position created
- Succeeded by: Djira Kono

Personal details
- Born: 25 December 1974 (age 51) Baturube, Central Sulawesi, Indonesia
- Party: PAN; PBB (former)

Asrar Abdul Samad (born 25 December 1974) is an Indonesian politician. He briefly served as the regent of North Morowali in Central Sulawesi between 2020 and 2021, after previously serving as its vice regent from 2016 to 2020.

== Early life ==
Asrar Abdul Samad was born at the village of Baturube, in North Bungku district of present-day North Morowali Regency, on 25 December 1974.

== Career ==
Prior to entering politics, Samad owned a palm oil plantation in North Morowali. His political career began when he joined the Crescent Star Party (PBB) in 1998, and he later would become chairman of the party's North Morowali branch. Between 2009 and 2014, he served in Morowali Regency's Regional House of Representatives as a deputy speaker. In 2015, Samad ran as the running mate of local businessman Apripel Tumimomor for North Morowali's first regency election, the pair defeating four other candidates after securing 18,675 votes (32%). They were sworn into office on 17 February 2016.

Samad's relationship with Tumimomor began to break up around 2017 over municipal project assignments, which Samad claimed heavily favored Tumimomor's political clientele over Samad's. By 2018, the relationship between Samad and Tumimomor had worsened, to the point where Samad stormed out of an official ceremony for appointing municipal employees after ripping the appointment letter in public view. Samad claimed that Tumimomor demanded a 15 percent fee on contractors for government projects in the regency, and also claimed that the new appointments had violated proper government procedure. Tumimomor later filed a police report against Samad for slander related to Samad's claim of a fee.

On 2 April 2020, Tumimomor died from COVID-19, and Samad became acting regent. Samad was officially appointed as full regent on 6 July 2020. His tenure, taking place during the heights of the COVID-19 pandemic in Indonesia, saw the municipal government distribute face masks and promote local agriculture to improve food security.

He declared his intention to run in the 2020 regency election, but ultimately did not participate in the election, won by Delis Julkarson Hehi. By 2023, he had moved to the National Mandate Party and became the party's local chair in North Morowali.

=== Criminal case ===
On 28 August 2025, the Palu Anti-Corruption Court sentenced Samad to 2 years and 4 months of prison, plus a fine of Rp 550 million, over the misuse of Rp 540 million (~USD 34 thousand) of municipal funds in 2021. Samad proceeded to appeal the ruling.

== Personal life ==
He is married to Farida Istighomah, and the couple has four children.
