= Aptripel Tumimomor =

Indonesian politician (1966–2020)

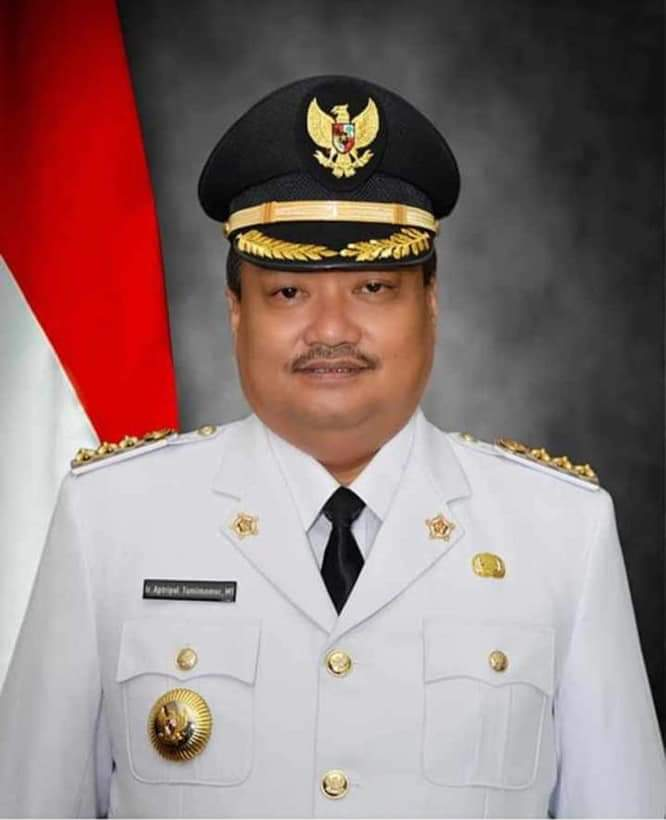

Regent of North Morowali
- In office February 17, 2016 – April 2, 2020
- Governor: Longki Djanggola
- Vice Governor: Asrar Abdul Samad (as Vice Regent)
- Preceded by: Haris Rengga
- Succeeded by: Asrar Abdul Samad

Personal details
- Born: April 3, 1966 Kolonodale, Central Sulawesi, Indonesia
- Died: April 2, 2020 (aged 53) Makassar, South Sulawesi
- Spouse: Liliana
- Children: Andhyka Haryanto; Arlyn Stevani; Arfan Irvanof

Aptripel Tumimomor (April 3, 1966 – April 2, 2020) was an Indonesian politician, businessman and engineer. He served as the Regent of North Morowali Regency, in Central Sulawesi, from February 17, 2016, until his death in office on April 2, 2020, from COVID-19.

== Biography ==
Aptripel Tumimomor was born on April 3, 1966, in Kolonodale, Central Sulawesi. He was a member of the Mori people, who are native to the present-day North Morowali Regency in Sulawesi. His parents, Hendrik Tumimomor Kamesi and Maligene Damantora Lande, were teachers. Tumimomor was a descendant of Mokole Ede Kamesi, known by the royal title Datu Ri Tana VIII (King Mori), who ruled the small Mori Kingdom in central Sulawesi from 1907 until 1928.

Tumimomor attended elementary school in Tomata village and high school in Poso. He then completed a degree in civil engineering from Paulus Christian University of Indonesia (UKIP) in Makassar. He also obtained his master's degree in civil engineering from Paulus Christian University as well.

=== Career ===
Tumimomor owned several businesses, including hotels in Kendari, plantations in Mamuju Regency, and a construction company. He also became a lecturer at his alma mater, Paulus Christian University of Indonesia (UKIP).

In February 2016, Aptripel Tumimomor was elected Regent of North Morowali in the regional election, while his running mate, Asrar Abdul Samad, a former Deputy Speaker of the North Morowali People's Representative Council from 2004 to 2009, was elected Vice Regent of North Morowali. Tumimomor and Samad won the election with 1,949 votes, or 25.13%, and defeated four other candidates. Regent Tumimomor and Vice Regent Samad were sworn into office on February 17, 2016, by Central Sulawesi Governor Longki Djanggola.

In March 2020, Tumimomor supported a proposal by the Mori tribe to have King Mori Mokole Marunduh named a National Hero of Indonesia.

Before his illness, Aptripel Tumimomor planned to seek re-election for a second term as North Morowali regent in 2020.

Tumimomor became ill in late March 2020. He was initially treated at Kolonadale General Hospital in North Morowali before being transferred to Makassar on April 1, 2020, as his health continued to deteriorate. The next day, Aptripel Tumimomor died at Dr. Wahidin Sudirohusodo General Hospital in Makassar on April 2, 2020, at the age of 53. A rapid test for coronavirus conducted in Kolonadale initially came back as negative. However, a second nasopharyngeal swab test given in the Makassar hospital later confirmed that Tumimomor was positive for COVID-19, but those results were not confirmed until April 4, two days after his death. He was survived by his wife, HO Liliana, and their three children - Andhyka Haryanto, Arlyn Stevani, and Arfan Irvanoff.

Aptripel Tumimomor was buried at a cemetery for civil servants in Gowa Regency, South Sulawesi. Officials conducted the burial using coronavirus safety precautions, including hazmat suits, masks, and plastic wrap.
