= South Bungku =

Island group in Indonesia

- Location within Sulawesi

Geography
- Location: East Sulawesi
- Coordinates: 3.5944°S 123.1122°E
- Area: 232.10 km^{2} (89.61 sq mi)

Demographics
- Population: 15,654 (as at 2025)

South Bungku District (Kecamatan Bungku Selatan in Indonesian) is essentially now just a string of islands off the east coast of Sulawesi, Indonesia, and consists of part of Morowali Regency comprising islands in the waters of the Banda Sea. Until 2022 this district included other villages on the mainland of Sulawesi to the south, but these three desa have now been separated off into a new Sombori Islands District (Kecamatan Kepulauan Sombori).

== Geography ==
The principal inhabited islands (from east to west) are Pulau Bungintende (with Bungintende village), Pulau Sainoa (containing the village of Sainoa), Pulau Umbele (containing the villages of Boelimau, Polewali, Umbele and Umbele Lama), Pulau Palimbawang (containing Palimbawang village), Pulau Dua Island (with the village of the same name), Pulau Paku (with Jawi Jawi, Buton, Koburu, Bungingkela, Paku, Bakala and Buajangka villages), Pulau Kaleroang (with Kalerorang village at its northern point), Pulau Waru Waru (with villages of Waru Waru, Poo and Poaro), Pulau Padabale (with Padabale village), and Pulau Pado Pado (with Pado Pado), with Pulau Bapa to its south (with village of the same name).

== Demographics ==
South Bungku District had a population of 15,654 residents as at mid 2025. Kaleroang, the most populous village, situated on the island of the same name (Pulau Kalerorang), which also serves as the seat of district government, had a population of 1,316 in mid 2024.

== Villages ==
Following the transfer in 2022 of its three most southern desa (Pulau Dua Darat, Lalemo and Lamontoli) on the mainland of Sulawesi to the new Sombori Islands District, the remaining 23 villages in the district (all classed as desa) are listed with their areas and their populations as at mid 2024.

| Kode Wilayah | Name of village | Area in km^{2} | Pop'n 2024 Estimate |
|---|---|---|---|
| 72.06.06.2001 | Sainoa | 6.32 | 1,111 |
| 72.06.06.2041 | Bungintende | 2.60 | 552 |
| 72.06.06.2045 | Boelimau | 9.27 | 592 |
| 72.06.06.2002 | Polewali | 20.08 | 450 |
| 72.06.06.2004 | Pulau Dua | 5.01 | 628 |
| 72.06.06.2043 | Palimbawang | 19.48 | 836 |
| 72.06.06.2003 | Umbele | 8.72 | 426 |
| 72.06.06.2009 | Jawi Jawi | 13.86 | 545 |
| 72.06.06.2008 | Buton | 7.91 | 1,067 |
| 72.06.06.2007 | Koburu | 8.90 | 313 |
| 72.06.06.2011 | Bungingkela | 12.87 | 758 |
| 72.06.06.2012 | Lokombulo | 11.87 | 599 |

| Kode Wilayah | Name of village | Area in km^{2} | Pop'n 2024 Estimate |
|---|---|---|---|
| 72.06.06.2006 | Paku | 11.10 | 587 |
| 72.06.06.2005 | Bakala | 18.79 | 1,167 |
| 72.06.06.2013 | Buajangka | 13.89 | 740 |
| 72.06.06.2010 | Kaleroang | 7.40 | 1,316 |
| 72.06.06.2014 | Waru Waru | 8.72 | 648 |
| 72.06.06.2044 | Poo | 5.87 | 364 |
| 72.06.06.2015 | Padabale | 15.72 | 258 |
| 72.06.06.2016 | Pado Pado | 13.83 | 592 |
| 72.06.06.2017 | Pulau Bapa | 7.90 | 370 |
| 72.06.06.2046 | Poaro | 4.30 | 500 |
| 72.06.06.2047 | Umbele Lama | 3.30 | 624 |
| Totals | South Bungku | 238.61 | 15,043 |
