= Delis Julkarson Hehi =

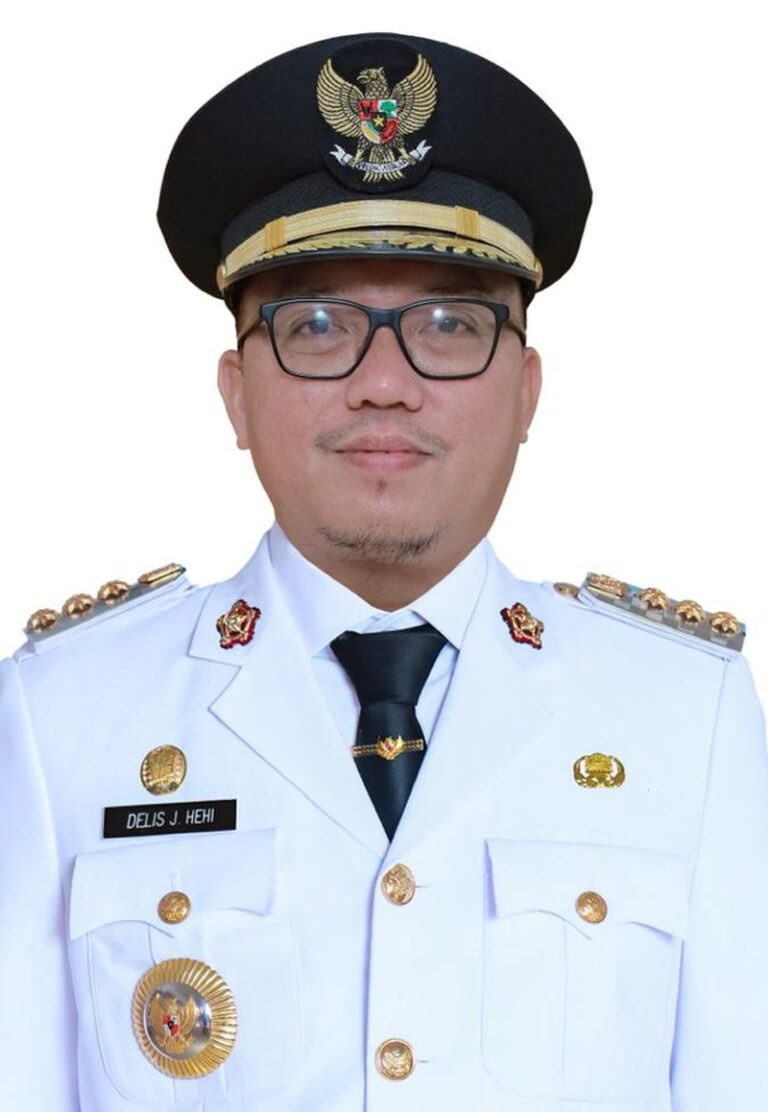

Regent of North Morowali
- Incumbent
- Assumed office 30 April 2021
- Preceded by: Asrar Abdul Samad

Indonesian Senator from Central Sulawesi
- In office 1 October 2014 – 1 October 2019

Personal details
- Born: 25 July 1976 (age 49) Beteleme, Central Sulawesi, Indonesia
- Party: Hanura

Delis Julkarson Hehi (born 25 July 1976) is an Indonesian physician and politician of the Hanura party who has served as the regent of North Morowali Regency, Central Sulawesi since April 2021. He had previously served as a senator representing Central Sulawesi between 2014 and 2019.

== Early life ==
Delis Julkarson Hehi was born at the village of Beteleme in present-day North Morowali Regency on 25 July 1976. After completing middle school in Beteleme by 1991, he studied at a Catholic high school in Poso, graduating in 1994. He then received his bachelor's degree in medicine from Hasanuddin University in Makassar in 1999.

== Career ==
After graduating from Hasanuddin, Hehi worked as a doctor. He worked for a time as a private doctor for Pelni, before becoming the resident physician and head of a Puskesmas in Bualemo district, Banggai Regency in 2003. He then moved to a Puskesmas in Tomata, in North Morowali, which he headed until 2008.

Hehi ran as the running mate of Chaeruddin Zen in Morowali Regency's 2012 regency election, with Zen-Hehi winning 17,676 votes and placing third out of four tickets. Hehi then ran as a candidate for the Regional Representative Council (DPD) to represent Central Sulawesi in the 2014 election, and won a seat after securing 101,620 votes. In the 2019 election, he ran for a seat in the House of Representatives representing the province as a Hanura candidate and won 41,235 votes, but failed to win a seat.

=== Regent ===
In 2020, Hehi ran in the regency election for North Morowali, with Djira Kono as his running mate. The pair was supported by Golkar, Nasdem, PKB, Hanura, and PBB, representing 17 out of 25 seats in the municipal legislature. They won 34,016 votes (50.46%) in the election, defeating HO Liliana (wife of a previous regent) who won 33,397 votes. After a partial revote by order of the Constitutional Court of Indonesia, Hehi and Kono were sworn in on 30 April 2021. Hehi and Kono ran for reelection in 2024, securing their second term after winning 39,089 votes (53%).

As regent, Hehi has called for increased investment in clean water and road infrastructure in North Morowali to support the expanding nickel mining industry. Municipal revenues increased from around Rp 100 billion (USD 7 million) at the start of his term to nearly Rp 500 billion (USD 30 million) by 2024, driven by increased income from royalties from mining companies and from taxes on small businesses supporting mining operations. In February 2026, speaking in front of DPD members, he called for an increased flexibility for municipal governments in allocating village funds and called for the government to allow increased salaries to village officials.

Politically, he is a member of Hanura, and holds the position of vice chairman within its central committee.

== Personal life ==
He is married to Febriyanthi Hongkiriwang, and the couple has two children.
