= Rennell Island bauxite mine =

Solomon Islands mines

- Location: Rennell Island, Solomon Islands
- Products: Bauxite
- Opened: Around 2011
- Closed: 2020
- Company: Bintang Delapan Group (among others)

Bauxite mining on Rennell Island began on the west side of the island in about 2011. Rennell Island is part of the Solomon Islands in the Pacific Ocean. Bintang Delapan Group is one of the major operators of the mine, subcontracted by Asia Pacific Investment Development.

The mine has had multiple spills, causing environmental damage, and local residents say they have not benefited from the mine in proportion to the damage it has caused. The government acknowledged that the mine was poorly regulated. The mining lease was cancelled in October 2020, although the mining company has contested this cancellation in court.

== Background ==
Bauxite is one of the main ingredients used to manufacture aluminium.

== Location ==
Rennell Island, a UNESCO World Heritage Site, and neighbouring Bellona Island have a combined population of around 3,000 people.

A 2011 to 2021 uptick in bauxite mining in the area occurred around the same time as logging activities.

== History ==
The mining company paid the government of the Solomon Islands US$17.8m in 2020 and US$16.4m in 2019.

Authorities estimate that about 50% of the bauxite deposit was exported between 2014 and 2021. In 2021, the Solomon Islands government reported that Bintang Delapan had failed to pay taxes and royalties on one third of the bauxite shipments they had exported since 2015, leaving the company owing around AU $16 million of unpaid taxes.

== Impact ==
Although the local economy flourished during the peak of the mining boom, the government concedes that the mining leases were poorly regulated, and the Solomon Islands have not benefited from the mining activity. Residents have said that the fabric of their community was damaged by the influx of foreign workers and that their water and soils are polluted.

In February 2019, during Cyclone Oma, a bulk carrier was grounded on Kongobainiu reef and spilled 300 tonnes of oil into the bay. Local people were unable to fish, their livestock died, and children suffered from skin and eye infections. Losses were estimated at $50 million. Estimates suggest that over 10,000 square metres of reef and over 4,000 square metres of lagoon habitat were destroyed and could take 130 years to recover.

5,000 tonnes of bauxite were spilled into the bay in July 2019. By 2021, over half of the impacted areas had not been rehabilitated.

In February 2025 the people of Rennell Island filed a case against the companies responsible for the oil spill at Kangava Bay. The claim identifies five companies as liable for the damage caused by the spill: Hong Kong-based King Trader Ltd, which owned the stricken vessel; the protection and indemnity insurer Korea P&I, a state-owned South Korean company; miner Bintan Mining Corporation and its subsidiary Bintan Mining (SI) Ltd; and MS Amlin Marine MV, a Dutch provider of charterer’s liability.
