= Wawonii language =

Austronesian language spoken in Sulawesi, Indonesia

Wawonii
- Wowoni
- Native to: Indonesia
- Region: Wawonii Island, Sulawesi
- Native speakers: 30,000 (2004)
- Language family: Austronesian: Malayo-Polynesian; Celebic; Bungku–Tolaki; Wawonii

Language codes
- ISO 639-3: wow
- Glottolog: wawo1239

Wawonii (Wowoni) is an Austronesian language (one of the Celebic languages) of Wawonii Island (Konawe Kepulauan Regency, Southeast Sulawesi) and Menui Island (in Morowali Regency, Central Sulawesi) islands of Indonesia. The language is quite close to the Bungku language.
