= Xiang Guangda =

Chinese industrialist

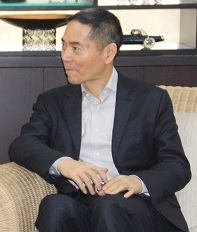
- Xiang in 2017
- Born: 1958 (age 67–68); Wenzhou, Zhejiang, China

Xiang Guangda (Chinese: 项光达; pinyin: Xiàng guāngdá; born 1958) is a Chinese industrialist. He is the founder of the Tsingshan Holding Group, a metallurgical company primarily engaged in the manufacturing of stainless steel.

== Early life and career ==
Xiang was born on 1962 to a working class family in Wenzhou, Zhejiang. He got his first job in 1980 as a mechanic in a state-run fishery company under Deng Xiaoping's iron rice bowl employment program, and was eventually promoted to director of the company's workshop. In 1986, he and his relatives established a workshop manufacturing car windows and doors.

== Tsingshan Group ==
He left his job at the state-owned firm in 1988 to become a full-time entrepreneur, raising the equivalent of around USD 100,000 from friends and relatives to fund their business. According to Xiang in an interview, he pivoted to manufacturing stainless steel after a 1992 trip to Germany which convinced him that his car parts manufacturing would not be sustainable in the long term. His firm was renamed to Tsingshan in 1998, and the company grew quickly due to its focus on bringing down costs. The firm pioneered the use of cheaper nickel pig iron in place of metallic nickel in its stainless steel production, and implemented the use of the rotary kiln furnace for continuous production.

Under Xiang, Tsingshan began to invest in nickel mines in Indonesia during the 2000s, when reserves were still unproven. Tsingshan established nickel and stainless steel production complexes in Sulawesi (the Morowali Industrial Park), which further lowered the production cost for stainless steel. Tsingshan also established production plants in India and Zimbabwe. Although in the mid-2000s Tsingshan was one of several stainless steel manufacturers in Wenzhou, by 2021 it accounted for nearly one-fourth of the global output, being by far the largest in the industry. Xiang's net worth is estimated by Forbes in 2021 as USD 1.2 billion.

In the several months leading to March 2022, Xiang began taking a large short position in nickel through Tsingshan, in order to hedge against falling prices. Due to a rise in nickel prices caused by the Russian invasion of Ukraine, however, Xiang was forced to purchase nickel contracts at the London Metal Exchange, creating a short squeeze. The price of nickel at the exchange increased by more than 100 percent, reaching over USD 100,000 per tonne before trading was suspended. By the time trading had been suspended, Tsingshan had suffered USD 10 billion in losses on paper. However, the Hong Kong-owned LME resorted to retroactively reverse tradings that had already happened, and after prices stabilized and trading was resumed, Xiang's losses were marked as significantly lower, sparking claims of trading manipulation by the exchange in order to favor Xiang Guangda, which the LME denied. Nickel prices later did fall, and Tsingshan's losses ended up at around USD 1 billion as Xiang closed his positions.

== Family ==
Xiang's wife along with their daughter Xiang Yangyang hold Singaporean citizenships.
