= Bintang Delapan Group =

Indonesian mining company

- Headquarters: Jakarta, Indonesia
- Area served: Asia Pacific
- Key people: Boby Tejakusuma (CEO)
- Services: Mining and smelting
- Subsidiaries: PT. Bintang Delapan Resources (Nickel trading); PT. Bintang Delapan Mineral (Nickel mining); PT. Bintang Delapan Capital (Investing); PT. Meltapratama Perkasa (Chemical trading); PT. Restu Alam Sentosa (Real estate); PT. Semangat Inovasi Kreatif (Media); PT. Dover Chemical (Chemical, packaging and engineering); PT. Sumber Permata Hitam (Coal mining); PT. Expertest (petrochemicals); PT. Garuda Agung Perkasa (Coal trading); PT. Batu Kita Bersama (Commodity trading); PT. Kencana Andalan Mineral (Limestone trading); PT. Jelajah Samudra Bersama (Shipping)

Bintang Delapan Group is one of the largest mining companies based in Indonesia. It mines minerals and smelts metals in Indonesia, the Solomon Islands and Myanmar, and partly owns the Indonesia Morowali Industrial Park.

== Organization ==
Bintang is one of the largest mining companies in Indonesia. Boby Tejakusuma is the Chief Executive Officer.

The company has close connections to the Indonesian National Armed Forces.

== History ==
Bintang invested US$1 billion in a partnership with Tsingshan Holding Group to build Indonesia Morowali Industrial Park (IMIP) nickel processing facility in Central Sulawesi which opened in 2015. IMIP employs 30,000 people and operates 20 smelters. As of 2022, Bintang was a 33.75% shareholder in IMIP.

Also in 2015, the Morowali Regency administration accused the company of operating its Bahodopi mining operations without the necessary Environmental Impact Analysis permit.

== Assets ==
Bintang Mining Company owns a bauxite mine in Rennell Island, Solomon Islands.

Bintang Delapan Group operates a Nickel smelting facilities in Indonesia.
