= Thoopterus =

Scientific classification
- Kingdom: Animalia
- Phylum: Chordata
- Class: Mammalia
- Order: Chiroptera
- Family: Pteropodidae
- Genus: Thoopterus; Matschie, 1899

Type species
- Cynopterus marginatus var. nigrescens Gray, 1870

Genus of bats

Thoopterus (Latin meaning: ״flying Jackal״) is a genus of megabat. It has two species:

- Swift fruit bat (Thoopterus nigrescens)
- Suhaniah fruit bat (Thoopterus suhaniahae)

Prior to 2012, it was considered to consist of only one species (T. nigrescens).
