= Swift fruit bat =

Conservation status
- Least Concern (IUCN 3.1)

Scientific classification
- Kingdom: Animalia
- Phylum: Chordata
- Class: Mammalia
- Order: Chiroptera
- Family: Pteropodidae
- Genus: Thoopterus
- Species: T. nigrescens

Binomial name
- Thoopterus nigrescens (Gray, 1870)
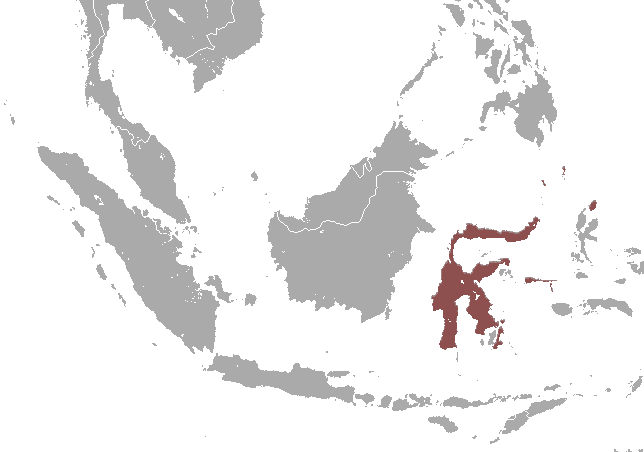
- Swift fruit bat range

Synonyms
- Cynopterus marginatus var. nigrescens Gray, 1870; Cynopterus nigrescens Gray, 1870; Cynopterus latidens Dobson, 1878

Species of bat

The swift fruit bat (Thoopterus nigrescens) is a species of megabat in the family Pteropodidae.

== Taxonomy ==
The swift fruit bat was initially described in 1870 by British zoologist John Edward Gray. He placed it in the genus Cynopterus, with a name of Cynopterus marginatus var. nigrescens. The type specimen had been collected on the Indonesian island of Morotai by Alfred Russel Wallace.

In 1899, German zoologist Paul Matschie created the subgenus Thoopterus within Cynopterus, into which he placed Cynopterus nigrescens. By 1912, Danish mammalogist Knud Andersen classified Thoopterus as a full genus, with T. nigrescens as the type species.

== Description ==
The combined length of the head and body is 94–109 mm (3.7–4.3 in), with a forearm length of 70–82 mm (2.8–3.2 in). Individuals weigh about 67–99 g (2.4–3.5 oz). The fur is grayish-brown.

== Range and habitat ==
The swift fruit bat is endemic to Indonesia, where it is found on the following islands: Sulawesi, Buton, Mangole, Wawonii, the Talaud and Sangihe archipelagos, and likely Morotai. It is found at elevations between 0–2,400 m (0–7,874 ft) above sea level. It seems to prefer intact forests, though will also utilize disturbed forests.
