= Menui Island =

Island group in Indonesia

Menui
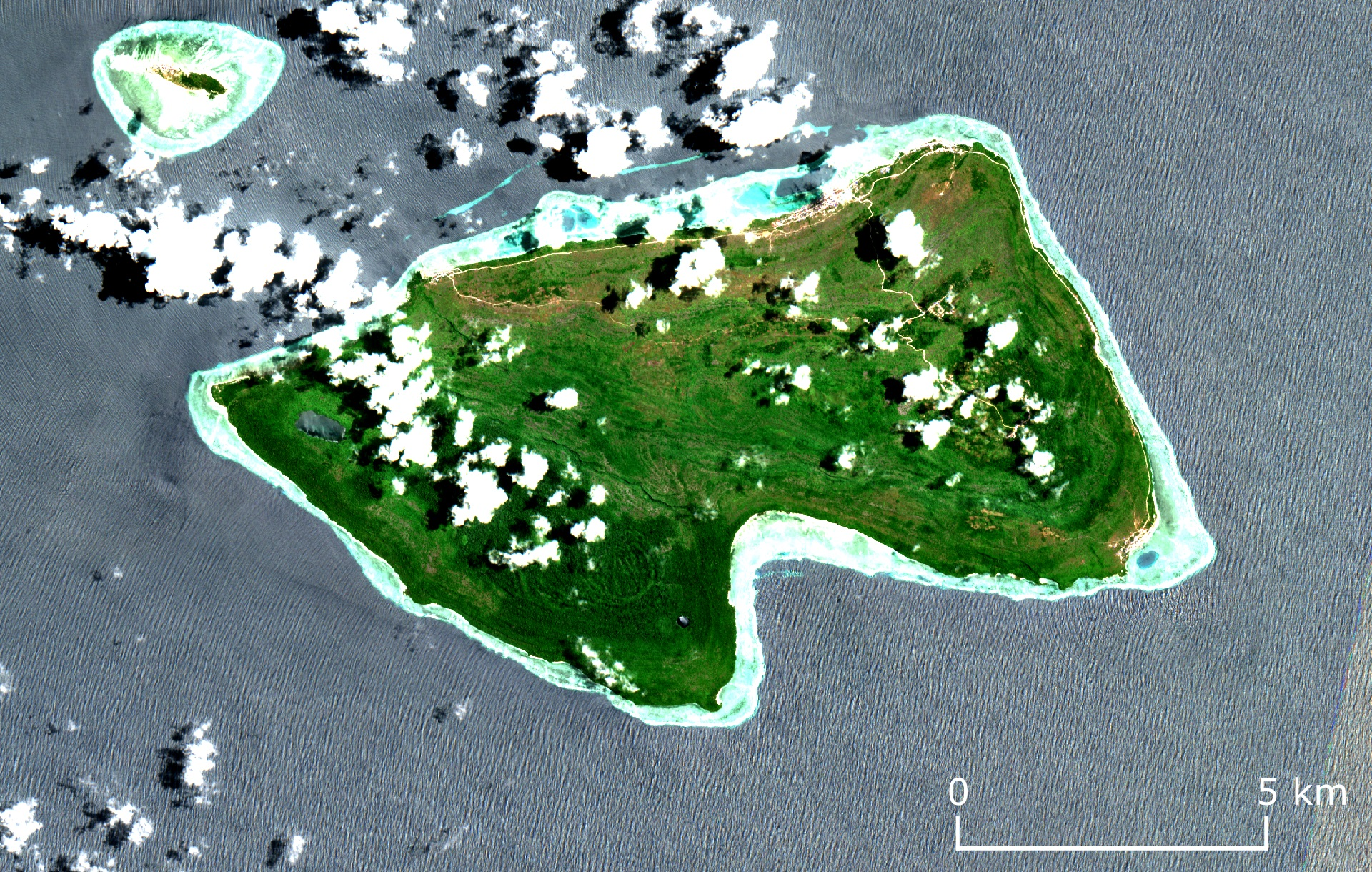

- Location within Sulawesi

Geography
- Location: Banda Sea
- Coordinates: 3.5944°S 123.1122°E
- Adjacent to: Sulawesi
- Area: 127.72 km^{2} (49.31 sq mi)
- Highest point: 267m

Demographics
- Population: 10,719 (as at 2025)

The Menui Islands (Kepulauan Menui in Indonesian), also written as Manui Islands, are located off the east coast of Sulawesi, Indonesia, in the waters of the Banda Sea. They are about 80 kilometres to the northeast of the city of Kendari. Administratively they constitute a district (Kecamatan Kepulauan Menui) of Morowali Regency within Central Sulawesi Province of Indonesia, although they are closer geographically to Southeast Sulawesi Province. Until 2022 this Menui Islands District included other islands further to the northwest, off the coast of South Bungku District, but these have now been separated off into a new Sombori Islands District (Kecamatan Kepulauan Sombori).

== Geography ==
The Menui Islands were formed as uplifted quaternary coral limestone islands, and form part of the Greater Sunda islands archipelago. The islands are made up of karst formations, one of which is a large ridge that separates an uninhabited monsoonal dry forest in the south west of the main island from the cleared and inhabited northeast side. The archipelago includes Pulau Padei Besar (Padei Darat desa) and Pulau Padei Kecil (Padei Laut desa) to the north of Menui Island, as well as several even smaller islands and islets further to the northwest such as Taka Belantang and Samarengga.

== Demographics ==
The Menui Islands had a population of 10,719 residents as at mid 2025. Ulunambo on the north coast, the largest village which also serves as the seat of district government, had a population of 2,367 in mid 2023. The islands have their own dialect of the Wawonii language, which differs slightly from the version spoken on larger Wawonii Island to the south.

== Villages ==
The 14 villages (all classed as desa except Ulunambo, which is an urban kelurahan) are listed with their areas and their populations as at mid 2024. All are on Menui Island except for the offshore island desa of Padei Laut, Padei Darat, Samarengga and Tafagapi.

Kode Wilayah	Name of village	Area in km^{2}	Pop'n 2024 Estimate
72.06.07.2008	Padei Laut	4.04	813
72.06.07.1007	Ulunambo	9.98	2,399
72.06.07.2017	Buranga	4.02	395
72.06.07.2015	Ulunipa	6.03	709
72.06.07.2006	Kofalagadi	17.10	507
72.06.07.2002	Torukuno	8.59	376
72.06.07.2016	Wawongkolono	9.50	388
72.06.07.2001	Terebino	13.11	929

Kode Wilayah	Name of village	Area in km^{2}	Pop'n 2024 Estimate
72.06.07.2003	Ngapaea	10.10	340
72.06.07.2005	Morompaitonga	10.07	385
72.06.07.2004	Padalaa	16.10	614
72.06.07.2009	Padei Darat	7.06	760
72.06.07.2010	Samarengga	4.02	852
72.06.07.2019	Tafagapi	8.00	327
Totals	Menui Islands	127.72	9,794
