= Bungku =

- Town
- Location within Sulawesi
- Coordinates: 2°32′S 121°58′E
- Country: Indonesia
- Province: Central Sulawesi
- Regency: Morowali Regency

Area
  - Total: 725.57 km^{2} (280.14 sq mi)

Population (2024)The area and population figures are of Central Bungku District.
  - Total: 36,385
- Time zone: UTC+8 (+8)

Bungku is a town and the administrative centre of the Regency of Morowali, in Central Sulawesi Province of Indonesia.

Bungku was originally not the capital of Morowali Regency. When Morowali Regency came into being on 4 October 1999, the capital of the new Regency was Kolonodale. In 2004, the plan to shift the Morowali capital southeast from Kolonodale to Bungku left non-Bungku residents, both Protestant and Muslim, feeling further disenfranchised. Accordingly on 12 April 2013 a separate North Morowali Regency (with its capital at Kolonodale) was established by separating the northwesterly districts from Morowali Regency.

The town is served by Maleo Airport, opened in March 2017.

== Climate ==
Bungku has a tropical rainforest climate (Af) with moderate rainfall from September to November and heavy rainfall from December to August.

Climate data for Bungku
Month	Jan	Feb	Mar	Apr	May	Jun	Jul	Aug	Sep	Oct	Nov	Dec	Year
Mean daily maximum °C (°F)	31.0 (87.8)	30.9 (87.6)	31.1 (88.0)	31.1 (88.0)	30.9 (87.6)	30.1 (86.2)	29.7 (85.5)	30.6 (87.1)	31.3 (88.3)	32.2 (90.0)	32.1 (89.8)	31.4 (88.5)	31.0 (87.9)
Daily mean °C (°F)	27.1 (80.8)	27.0 (80.6)	27.2 (81.0)	27.2 (81.0)	27.2 (81.0)	26.6 (79.9)	26.0 (78.8)	26.5 (79.7)	26.8 (80.2)	27.4 (81.3)	27.7 (81.9)	27.4 (81.3)	27.0 (80.6)
Mean daily minimum °C (°F)	23.2 (73.8)	23.2 (73.8)	23.3 (73.9)	23.4 (74.1)	23.6 (74.5)	23.1 (73.6)	22.3 (72.1)	22.4 (72.3)	22.3 (72.1)	22.7 (72.9)	23.4 (74.1)	23.4 (74.1)	23.0 (73.4)
Average rainfall mm (inches)	170 (6.7)	172 (6.8)	212 (8.3)	248 (9.8)	235 (9.3)	247 (9.7)	205 (8.1)	160 (6.3)	90 (3.5)	72 (2.8)	98 (3.9)	143 (5.6)	2,052 (80.8)
Source: Climate-Data.org
