= Kingdom of Bungku =

Historical kingdom in Indonesia

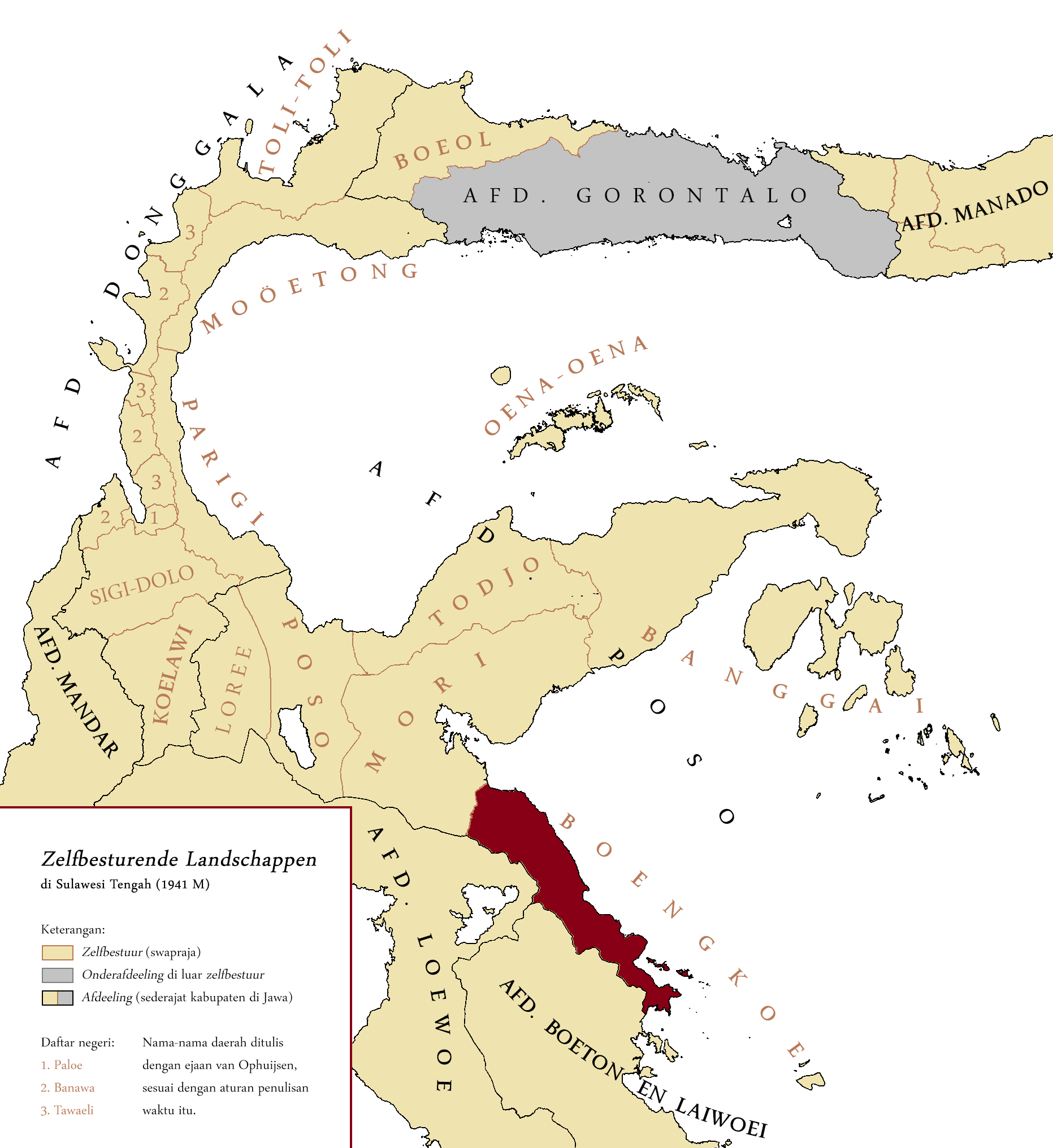
- Bungku (Boengkoe; in red) with other native polities in Central Sulawesi, 1941.
- Status: Tributary state of the Sultanate of Ternate
- Common languages: Bungku
- Religion: Sunni Islam
- Government: Monarchy
Succeeded by
Dutch East Indies
- Today part of: Indonesia

The Kingdom of Bungku, also known as Tobunku or Tobungku, was an Islamic polity in present-day Central Sulawesi, Indonesia. It was located on the Southeast Peninsula of Sulawesi, in what is today Morowali Regency. Throughout most of its pre-colonial history, the polity was under a tributary relationship with the Sultanate of Ternate, with strong influence from Bugis merchants and the Bone State.

Bungku was a trading and raiding center on Sulawesi's eastern coast, exporting slaves, iron, inland produce, and sea cucumbers among others. Its economic fortunes declined following a series of conflicts in the mid-nineteenth century, and it was subsumed under the colonial administration of the Dutch East Indies in 1905. It remained as an autonomous subdivision of the Dutch East Indies, and later Indonesia, until its absorption into Poso Regency in 1961.

== History ==
Spanish explorer Andrés de Urdaneta in a 1525 account recorded the settlement of Tabuay, later known as Bungku, as a "lively trading settlement". The polity came under Ternatean rule following a 1580 campaign by Sultan Babullah of Ternate (r. 1570–1583) as part of his conquests in Eastern Indonesia. However, Bungku's vassalage to Ternate was inconsistent, due to the influence of both the Dutch East India Company and the nearby Bone Kingdom in South Sulawesi. The Sultanate of Gowa also exercised influence, becoming Bungku's overlord in 1636 until its return to Ternate in 1667.

In 1672, Bungku named its own king, and by 1689 it refused to acknowledge Ternatean overlordship. Ternate's Sultan took no military action, as he believed that an attack on Bungku would be repelled and cause a loss of Ternatean prestige. A tributary relationship remained between Bungku and Ternate, however, lasting until the nineteenth century. In 1840, after a succession dispute, Bungku rebelled against Ternate with the aid of Bugis princes from Bone, but was defeated by mid-1842. During the 1850s, Bungku engaged in a prolonged conflict against its neighbor the Mori, which went poorly for the Bungku and lasted until a Dutch-Ternatean intervention enforced peace between the two.

Direct colonial rule was imposed under the Dutch East Indies in 1905, and Bungku was subsumed into the landschap of Boengkoe. The kingdom continued to exercise local power throughout early Indonesian independence, initially as part of Central Sulawesi within the State of East Indonesia. When East Indonesia was dissolved, Bungku became part of Indonesia, maintaining local autonomy with its last ruler Abdurrabie becoming head of the autonomous district of Bungku. This arrangement lasted until 1961, when Bungku was converted into a regular district within Poso Regency.

== Government and military ==
The ruler of Bungku had limited powers over chiefs of various settlements within the polity. Following an old custom, the king of Bungku would relocate every two to three years to be inaugurated as ruler at various settlements, until a treaty with Ternate in 1885 banned the practice. Prior to Ternate's campaign in the 1840s, the king was based near the hilltop fort of Fafontofure. Fafontofure was destroyed by Ternatean soldiers, and the Bungku king was forced to relocate to the coastal settlement of Lanona in 1848.

Bungku had no standing military force, but in the event of a conflict or an outgoing raid, the population would be summoned to the ruler's settlement. Raids would be launched on neighboring states in order to obtain slaves and to obtain heads, with one raid against Banggai in 1808 returning with 69 human heads. These raiders were carried by fleets of kora kora boats, with one Bungku raid in 1695 involving 32 boats. Local oral tradition attributes the founding of many inland villages within Bungku's rule to the marriage of a Bungku ruler with captives from such raids. Dutch East India Company officials in 1749 wrote that inhabitants of the Bungku kingdom were "the fiercest of all Malukan peoples".

== Economy ==
According to Dutch sources, Bungku was a secondary trade center during the late seventeenth and early eighteenth century, and was known as a smuggling and slave trading center. It benefitted from its relative proximity to Makassar, and was frequented by Bugis merchants. In the 1830s, colonial authorities considered Bungku to be the main port in Sulawesi's eastern coast. Bungku's maritime trade rapidly declined after its subjugation by Ternate in the 1840s, which coincided with a decline in Bugis trade. Trade increased again in the late nineteenth century when KPM extended its shipping service from Kendari to reach Bungku.

Goods traded at Bungku included spices, tortoiseshell, and wax. Iron mining and blacksmithing was a major industry, with iron tools exported to tribes in Halmahera, Seram, and Raja Ampat. The neighboring Kingdom of Luwu was Bungku's competitor in this trade, with the ore-rich vicinity of Lake Matano being contested by the two polities. Sea cucumbers were also traded in the nineteenth century, with Makassarese, Bugis, and potentially Chinese traders calling at Bungku to acquire them.

Dutch governor in Ternate, Robertus Padtbrugge, in 1679 counted over fifty villages within Bungku, with populations ranging from 100 to 500. In 1706, Dutch officials in the region estimated a regional population of around 8 to 9 thousand, excluding the population of the Gulf of Tolo to the north (at that time subject to Bungku rule). In 1850, the main settlement at Lanona had a population of around 1,500. Agriculture was well-developed. Bungku's rulers, based in the coastal areas, received tribute in agricultural produce from inland territories, which in turn was supplied to Ternate as tribute.
