= Tsingshan Holding Group =

Chinese metals company

Tsingshan Holdings Group
- Type: Private
- Industry: Stainless steel, nickel
- Founded: 1988; 38 years ago
- Founders: Xiang Guangda
- Headquarters: Wenzhou, China
- Area served: Worldwide
- Key people: Xiang Guangda (CEO)
- Revenue: US$28 billion (2018)
- Number of employees: 56,000 (2018)
- Website: tssgroup.com

Tsingshan Holding Group
- Traditional Chinese: 青山控股集團有限公司
- Simplified Chinese: 青山控股集团有限公司
- Literal meaning: Green Mountain Holdings Group Company Limited
Transcriptions
Standard Mandarin
- Hanyu Pinyin: Qīngshān kònggǔ jítuán yǒuxiàn gōngsī
- IPA: [tɕʰíŋ.ʂán]

The Tsingshan Holdings Group (Chinese: 青山控股, ching-shan) is a Chinese private company active in the metallurgical industry, namely stainless steel, nickel, and aluminium.

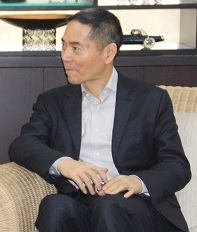
Xiang Guangda in 2017

Tsingshan Holdings was founded in 1988 by Xiang Guangda in Wenzhou. It moved into the Indonesian nickel industry in 2009.

Among its assets are:

- Bases for nickel-chromium alloy smelting, stainless steel smelting and steel rolling in Lishui, Fuyang, Yangjiang and Qingyuan
- A share in the Morowali Industrial Park - a nickel processing facility with at least 20 smelters in Morowali Regency, Sulawesi, part of the Belt and Road Initiative
- The company also has a joint venture with another Chinese group, Huafon, for an aluminium smelter there which was commissioned in 2023. Another smelter is planned to start production in 2026.
- Chrome ore mines in Zimbabwe
- Sales outlets in Foshan, Wenzhou, Shanghai and Wuxi

In 2017 Tsingshan was reported to be the world's largest producer of ferro-nickel and the second-largest manufacturer of stainless steel.

Tsingshan was ranked 279th in the Fortune Global 500 for 2021. It was described in 2022 as the world's largest nickel producer.

In early 2022, Tsingshan experienced financial difficulty after shorting the price of nickel, only to see it rise. The firm took losses of about US$1 billion, and later disbanded its internal futures trading team.
