= Sombori Islands =

Island group in Indonesia

- Location within Sulawesi

Geography
- Location: Banda Sea
- Coordinates: 3.03°S 122.5°E
- Adjacent to: Sulawesi
- Area: 267.78 km^{2} (103.39 sq mi)

Demographics
- Population: 5,388 (as at 2025)

The Sombori Islands (Sombori Kepulauan in Indonesian) are located off the east coast of Sulawesi, Indonesia, in the waters of the Banda Sea. Administratively they constitute a district (Kecamatan Sombori Kepulauan ) of Morowali Regency within Central Sulawesi Province of Indonesia. Until 2022 these islands, located off the south coast of South Bungku District formed part of the Menui Islands District, but they have now been separated off to form the new District, which also includes the three most southern desa from the mainland of Morowali Regency.

== Demographics ==
The Sombori Islands District had a population of 5,388 residents as at mid 2025. Tanjung Harapan on the southeast coast of the Sulawesi mainland, the village which also serves as the seat of district government, had a population of 384 in mid 2024.

== Villages ==
The thirteen villages now forming the district (all classed as desa) are listed with their areas and their populations as at mid 2024. The first ten of these desa were brought in from Menui Kepulauan District, while the last three of these desa were brought in from South Bungku District.

Kode Wilayah	Name of village	Area in km^{2}	Pop'n 2024 Estimate
72.06.07.2011	Masadian	6.03	1,377
72.06.07.2012	Pulau Tiga	3.85	766
72.06.07.2013	Matano	13.79	356
72.06.07.2014	Matarape	20.03	625
72.06.07.2018	Dongkalang	13.01	557
72.06.07.2022	Tanjung Tiram	9.00	227
72.06.07.2021	Mbokitta	7.07	219
72.06.07.2023	Tanona	7.10	376
72.06.07.2020	Pulau Tengah	3.20	249
72.06.07.2024	Tanjung Harapan	12.90	384
72.06.06.2018	Lalemo	48.09	384
72.06.06.2019	Lamontoli	118.70	601
72.06.06.2048	Pulau Dua Darat	5.01	240
Totals	Sombori Islands	267.78	6,361
