= Kolonodale =

- Town
- Location within Sulawesi
- Coordinates: 1°59′S 121°20′E
- Country: Indonesia
- Province: Central Sulawesi
- Regency: North Morowali Regency

Area
  - Total: 30.57 km^{2} (11.80 sq mi)

Population (2023 estimate)
  - Total: 3,501
- Time zone: UTC+8 (+8)

Kolonodale is a town (kelurahan) and the administrative centre of the North Morowali Regency, in Central Sulawesi Province of Indonesia. The town had 3,501 inhabitants as at mid 2023, or 10,496 including the neighbouring urban villages (kelurahan) of Bahontula and Bahoue. It is also the administrative centre of Petasia District (kecamatan), one of the districts within the regency, with a total district population of 22,926 inhabitants according to the official estimates as at mid 2024.

Kolonodale was originally the administrative capital of Morowali Regency. In 2004, the plan to shift the Morowali capital southeast from Kolonodale to Bungku left non-Bungku residents, both Protestant and Muslim, feeling further disenfranchised. On 12 April 2013, a new North Morowali Regency was established, partitioned from the Morowali Regency, with Kolonodale as its principal town.

== Climate ==
Kolonodale has a tropical rainforest climate (Af) with heavy to very heavy rainfall year-round.

Climate data for Kolonodale
Month	Jan	Feb	Mar	Apr	May	Jun	Jul	Aug	Sep	Oct	Nov	Dec	Year
Mean daily maximum °C (°F)	30.9 (87.6)	31.0 (87.8)	31.2 (88.2)	31.3 (88.3)	31.2 (88.2)	30.5 (86.9)	30.0 (86.0)	30.9 (87.6)	31.5 (88.7)	32.5 (90.5)	32.1 (89.8)	31.4 (88.5)	31.2 (88.2)
Daily mean °C (°F)	27.0 (80.6)	27.2 (81.0)	27.3 (81.1)	27.4 (81.3)	27.5 (81.5)	26.8 (80.2)	26.2 (79.2)	26.7 (80.1)	27.0 (80.6)	27.7 (81.9)	27.8 (82.0)	27.4 (81.3)	27.2 (80.9)
Mean daily minimum °C (°F)	23.2 (73.8)	23.4 (74.1)	23.4 (74.1)	23.5 (74.3)	23.8 (74.8)	23.2 (73.8)	22.4 (72.3)	22.6 (72.7)	22.5 (72.5)	23.0 (73.4)	23.5 (74.3)	23.5 (74.3)	23.2 (73.7)
Average rainfall mm (inches)	197 (7.8)	204 (8.0)	264 (10.4)	334 (13.1)	376 (14.8)	311 (12.2)	299 (11.8)	257 (10.1)	196 (7.7)	149 (5.9)	174 (6.9)	222 (8.7)	2,983 (117.4)
Source: Climate-Data.org
