= Wawonii Island =

Island in Southeast Sulawesi, Indonesia

Wawonii
- Location within Sulawesi

Geography
- Location: Southeast Asia
- Coordinates: 4°08′S 123°06′E
- Area: 867.58 km^{2} (334.97 sq mi)

Administration
- Indonesia

Demographics
- Population: 44,423 (mid 2025 Estimate)
- Pop. density: 51.2/km^{2} (132.6/sq mi)

Wawonii (formerly called Wowoni) is an island in the Banda Sea, Indonesia, off the south east coast of Sulawesi. Its land area is 867.58 km^{2} and at the 2020 Census it had a population of 37,050; the official estimate as at mid 2025 was 44,423. From 2013, it forms a regency of its own within Southeast Sulawesi Province, having previously been a part of Konawe Regency; the new Regency, which comprises the seven districts on Wawonii Island, is named Konawe Islands Regency (Kabupaten Konawe Kepulauan). The administrative capital of the new Regency is Langara (in West Wawonii District).

The Wawonii language is spoken here and also in a similar dialect on Menui Island (which lies to the north of Wawonii, and which is administratively part of Morowali Regency within Central Sulawesi Province).

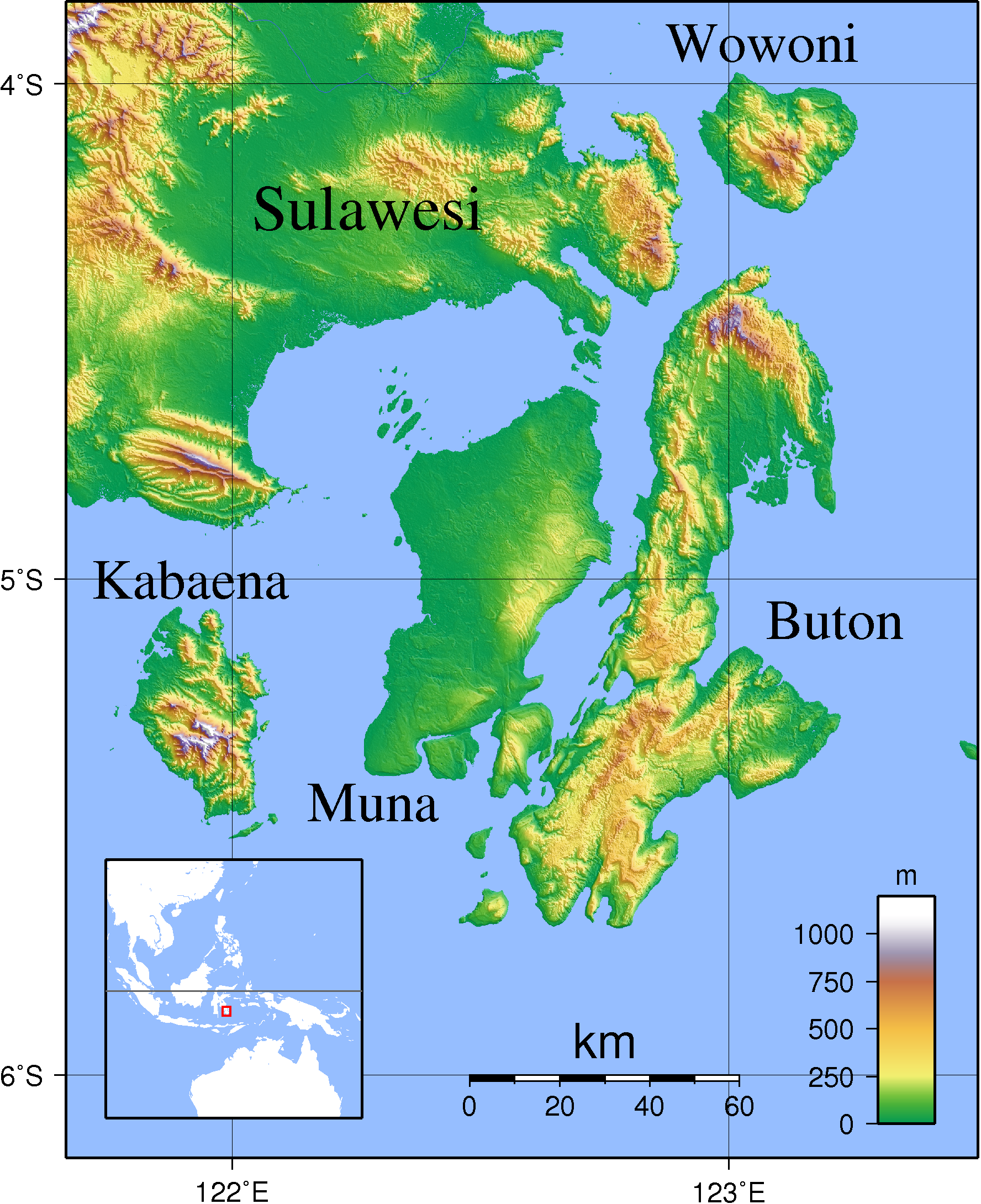
Wawonii Island in the north of the Buton Islands Archipelago

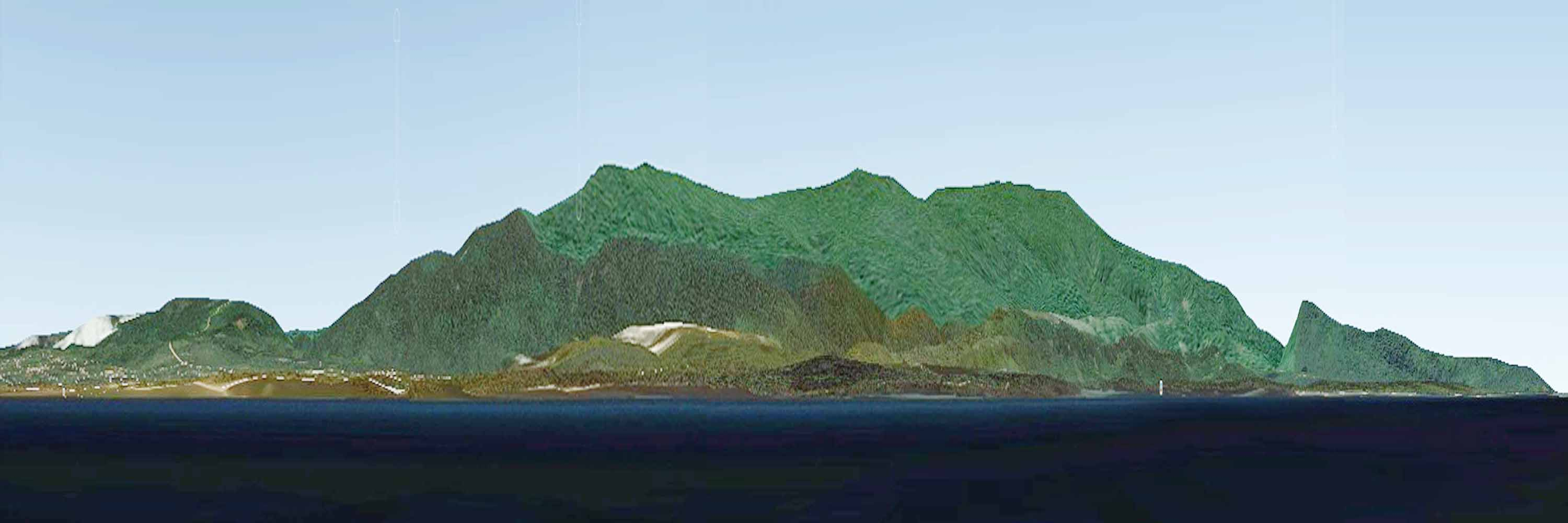
Wawonii Island
