= Morowali Industrial Park =

Industrial park in Morowali Regency, Central Sulawesi, Indonesia

Coordinates: 02°49′48″S 122°09′36″E

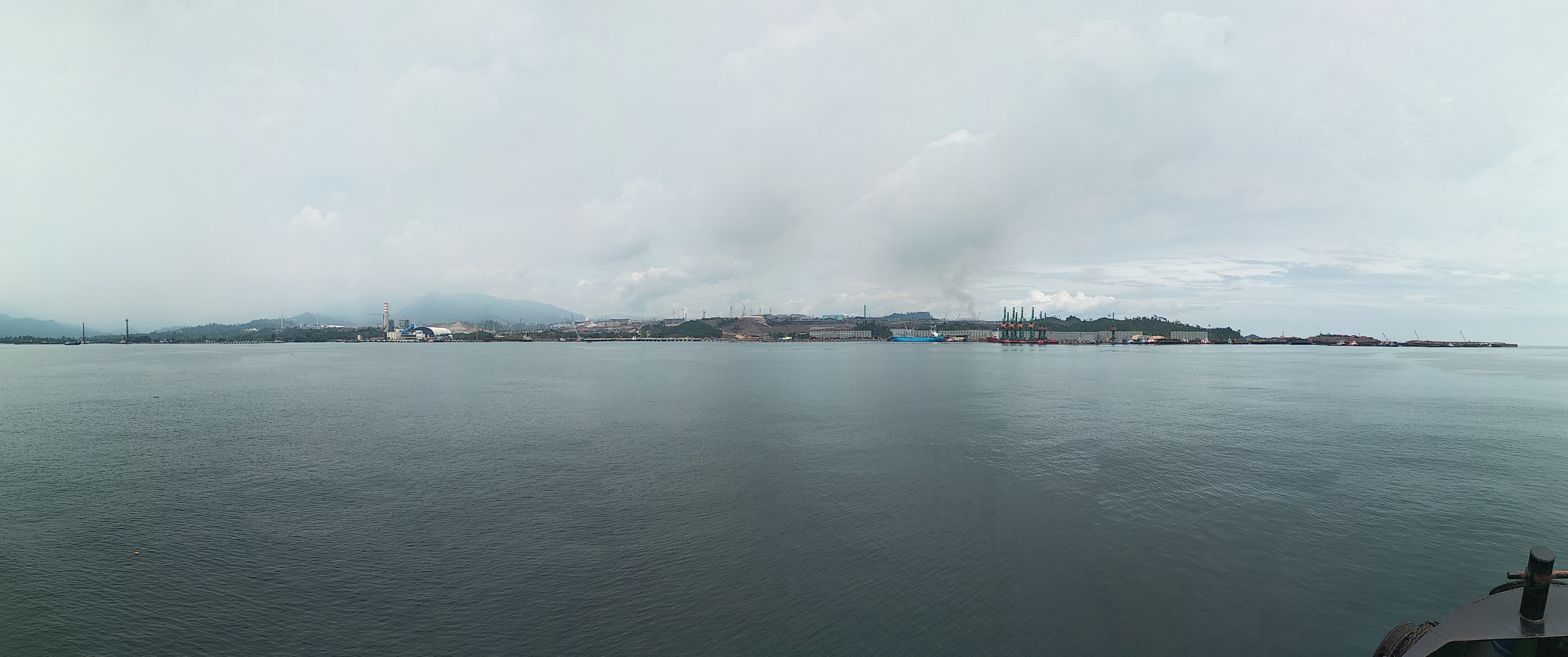
The port area of the park

The Indonesia Morowali Industrial Park (IMIP) is an industrial park hosting primarily nickel-related industries in Morowali Regency, Central Sulawesi, Indonesia. It is the largest nickel processing site in Indonesia, which is the world's top nickel producer. IMIP mainly comprises two key clusters based on nickel ore: a stainless steel cluster and an electric vehicle (EV) battery materials cluster. In addition, it includes a carbon steel cluster based on iron ore. The park also features several supporting clusters, including aluminum production and coke processing.

The park employs approximately 85,000 workers. It has been linked to significant environmental pollution and disruptions to nearby communities. Reports from workers and advocacy organizations highlight poor working conditions, with documented cases of industrial accidents resulting in injuries and fatalities.

== Background ==
Indonesia has the world's largest nickel reserves. Nickel is used to manufacture lithium-ion batteries used in electric vehicles, and Indonesia is positioned to be a key supplier of the mineral for the booming electric vehicle battery market. The country banned export of unprocessed nickel ores around 2013, and has signed several deals with battery manufacturers.

In 2022, Indonesia produced 1.6 million tons of nickel, nearly half of global production.

== Description ==
The industrial park is located in Bahodopi district of Morowali Regency, Central Sulawesi. It covers 2,000 hectares, and is served by a seaport, an airport, and a 2 GW coal power plant. It is operated by PT Indonesia Morowali Industrial Park.

There were reportedly 50 companies in production, construction and planning stages at IMIP with a total investment of USD 34.3 billion in December 2024. The park's estimated total capacity for stainless steel production was 3 million metric tonnes per year in 2020. In 2019, IMIP had plans to develop electric vehicle battery plants. It generated USD 6.6 billion in exports for Indonesia in 2019.

== History ==
Since 1968 Morowali had been the site of a nickel mining operation owned by Inco, which was subsequently acquired by Vale. In August 2013, the Indonesian Ministry of Industry announced plans to develop a 1,500 hectare nickel-oriented industrial park in Morowali. A MoU for the USD 1.5 billion project was signed between Tsingshan Holding Group and Bintang Delapan Group in October 2013. In February 2014 Tsingshan secured a ten-year $384 million loan from China Development Bank for its 300,000-tpy nickel pig iron project. The China-ASEAN Investment Cooperation Fund had funded the balance of the $640 million project. The first stone for the industrial park's construction was placed by Minister of Industry Saleh Husin on 5 December 2014.

Companies began to operate starting in April 2015, with president Joko Widodo inaugurating a smelter on 28 May 2015. In September 2018, Chinese battery firm GEM Co Ltd, Contemporary Amperex Technology Ltd (CATL), stainless steel-maker Tsingshan Holding Group, Japanese trading house Hanwa and Indonesia PT Bintangdelapan Group together invested $700 million in a IMIP project to produce battery-grade nickel chemicals. The joint venture planned to establish nickel smelting capacity of at least 50,000 tonnes per year and 4,000 tonnes of cobalt smelting per year.

By 2021, Tsingshan had become Indonesia's top nickel producer. In March 2023, a joint venture was announced between PT Vale Indonesia, Taiyuan Iron & Steel Company (Tisco) and Shangdong Xinhai Technology (Xinhai), to build a RKEF ferronickel processing plant with a minimum annual production of 73,000 metric tons of nickel.

On 24 December 2023, a major fire occurred at a Tsingshan-owned nickel smelter inside the facility, killing 21 people. In response, at least 25 tenant companies within the park have taken the SMK3 (Occupational Health and Safety Management System) certification, as mandated by the Indonesian government, to strengthen workplace safety standards and prevent similar incidents in the future.

As of 2025, IMIP contained no less than 11 smelters of various metals. The park's operating company claimed that the total investment between 2015 and 2024 reached USD 34.3 billion.

== Impact ==
=== Local ===
Environmentalists report that pollution from IMIP has destroyed fish populations and local forests. Local residents also experience frequent disruptions in power, phone, and internet services due to oversaturation. The population has grown very quickly due to the workers, sanitation services have not been provided, and there are open sewers. Large numbers of commuting workers have also overloaded local roads and caused daily traffic jams lasting hours at a time, with local land prices rapidly increasing from around Rp 12,000 per square meter in 2010 to over Rp 2 million per square meter by 2025. Local farmers report that half their harvest were purchased by IMIP companies.

The regency government of Morowali reported an increase of municipal government revenues from Rp 180 billion in 2018 to Rp 600 billion in 2022, of which 80 percent were attributed to IMIP. On paper, Morowali Regency's GDP per capita became the highest in Indonesia at 927.2 million (~USD 60,000) in 2023, however, activists claimed that around 95 percent of this were remitted to other regions of Indonesia or abroad. Between 2021 and 2025, the municipal government estimated that the number of businesses registered in Bahodopi district alone increased by 3,000 (IMIP gave preference to locally registered contractors), creating over additional 16,000 jobs.

=== Workforce ===
There were around 85,000 employees working at IMIP by the end of 2024, of which around 15,000 were foreign workers, and an additional 27,000 indirect jobs were estimated to be related to the industrial park. Around 15,000 of the Indonesian workers originated from Morowali Regency, with local elementary school graduates being accepted for job openings. A dedicated metallurgical polytechnic opened in 2017 specifically to supply skilled workers for the park.

Workers and advocacy organisations report unsafe working conditions in some smelters at IMIP. Deaths and injuries are frequently reported, and pollution has caused respiratory illness and eye problems. One report found that ten people had died at the smelter between 2020 and 2023. Two workers were killed on the fourth day of the strike. A government official said they had little power to enforce safety regulations in the industry. In 2023, some workers filed a lawsuit against the company over poor working conditions.
