= North Morowali Regency =

Regency in Central Sulawesi, Indonesia

North Morowali Regency Kabupaten Morowali Utara
- Regency
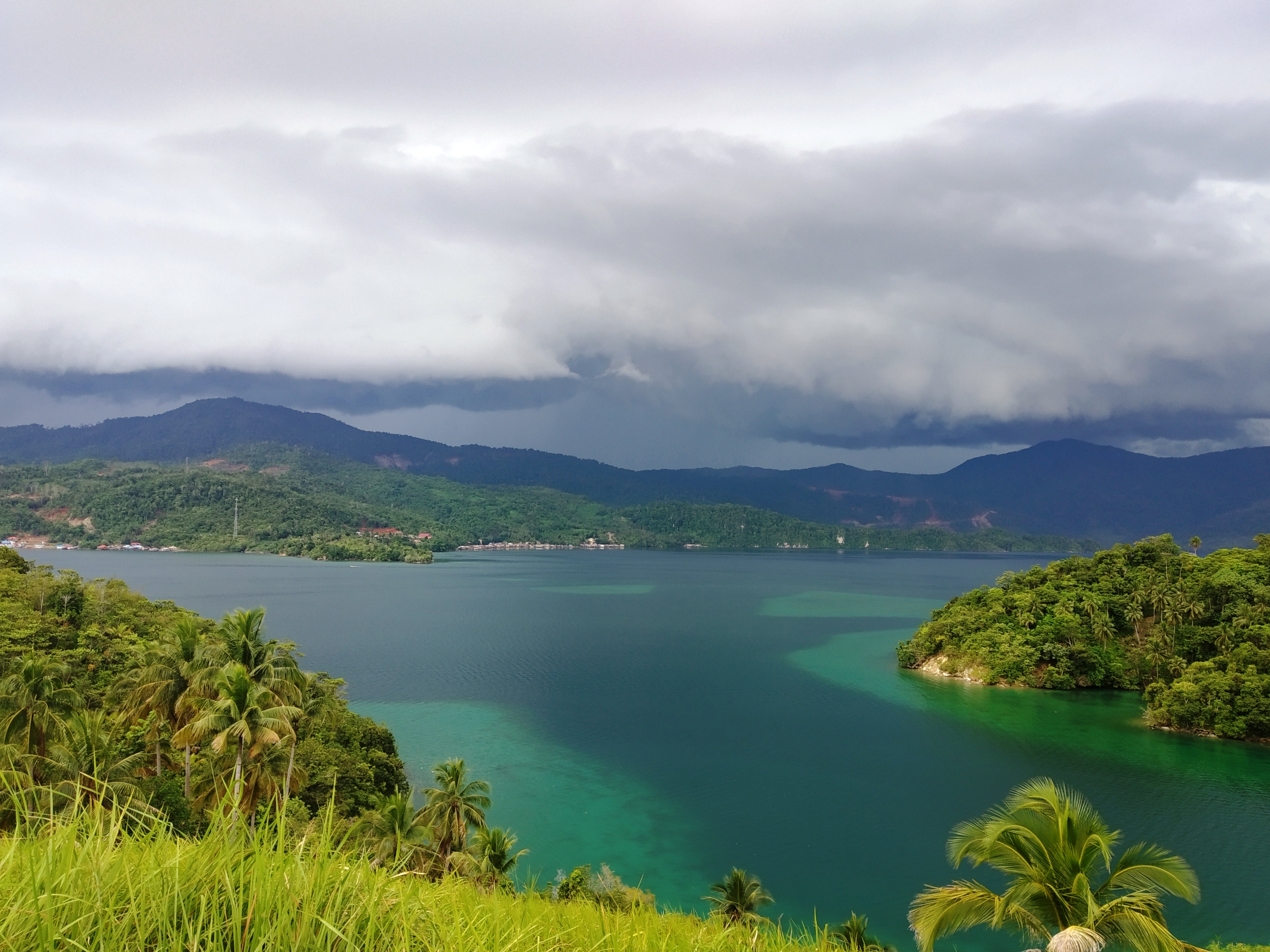
- Tomori Bay, a deep inlet in Petasia District

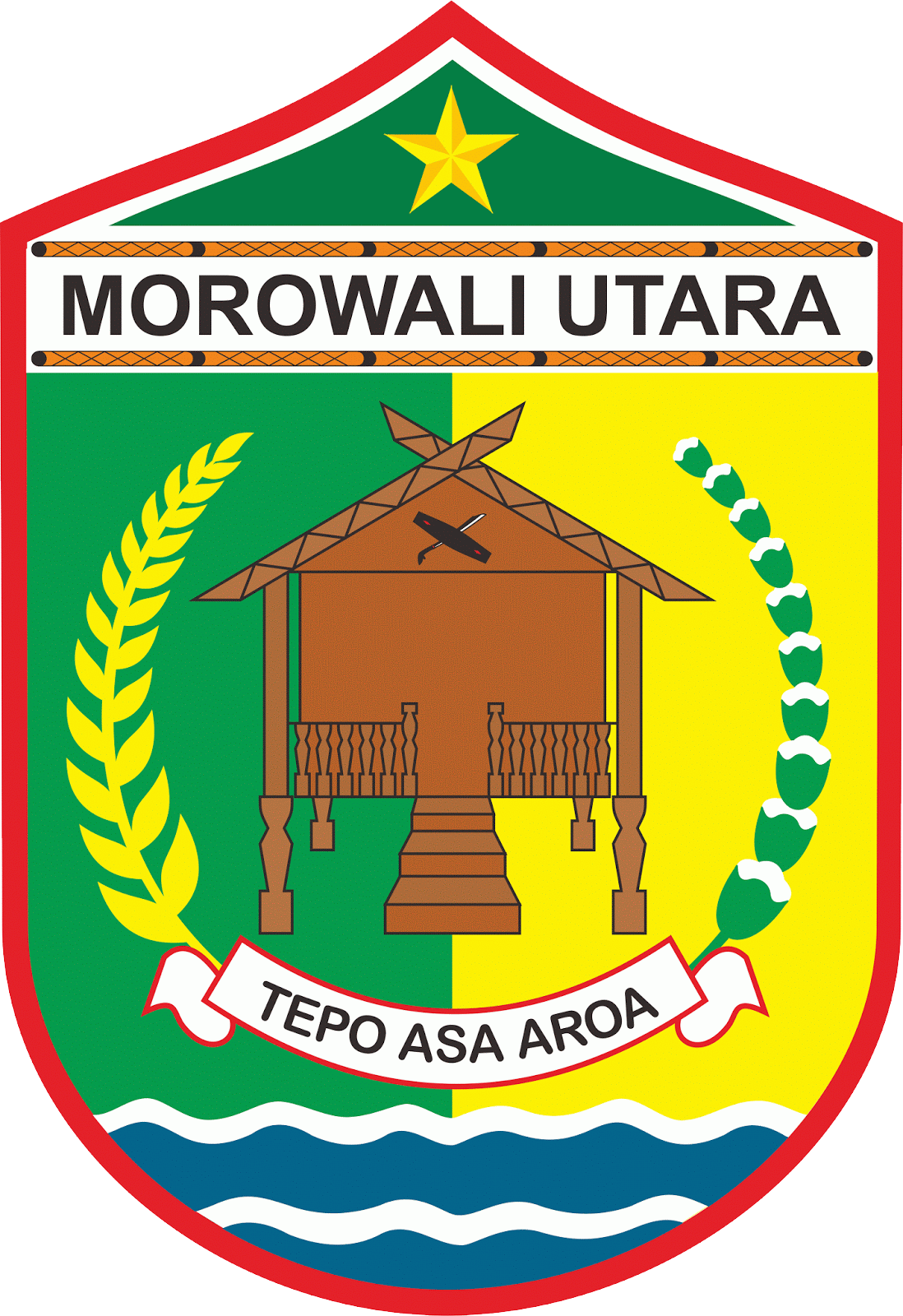
- Coat of arms
- Motto(s): Tepo Asa Aroa (One Word, One Determination and One Goal)
- Location within Central Sulawesi

- Location in Sulawesi and Indonesia North Morowali Regency (Indonesia)
- Coordinates: 1.9870°S 121.3390°E
- Country: Indonesia
- Province: Central Sulawesi
- Established: 12 April 2013
- Capital: Kolonodale

Government
  - Regent: Delis Julkarson Hehi
  - Vice Regent: Djira K

Area
  - Total: 10,004.28 km^{2} (3,862.67 sq mi)

Population (mid 2025 estimate)
  - Total: 155,142
  - Density: 15.5076/km^{2} (40.1644/sq mi)
- Time zone: UTC+8 (ICST)
- Area code: (+62) 465
- Website: morowaliutarakab.go.id

North Morowali Regency is a regency in the province of Central Sulawesi, Indonesia. The regency was established on 12 April 2013, partitioned from the northwestern districts of Morowali Regency (having formed almost two-thirds of the Morowali Regency at that time). It covers an area of 10,004.28 km^{2} and the component districts which were then in Morowali Regency had a combined population of 104,094 at the 2010 Census. The new regency had 120,789 inhabitants at the 2020 Census; the official estimate as of mid-2025 was 155,142 (comprising 84,231 males and 70,911 females). The administrative centre lies at the town of Kolonodale (with 4,602 inhabitants in 2024), but Bunta town (with 8,981 inhabitants in 2024), Bahontula town (with 5,458 inhabitants in 2024) and Burgintimbe (with 4,783 inhabitants in 2024) are all larger.

== Administrative districts ==
The North Morowali Regency was divided (following its separation from Morowali Regency in 2013) into seven districts (kecamatan), but three further districts (Lembo Raya, Petasia Timur and Petasia Barat) were created in the southern part of the regency. These are all tabulated below with their areas and their populations at the 2010 Census and the 2020 Census, together with the official estimates as of mid-2025. The table also includes the locations of the district headquarters, the numbers of administrative villages in each district (totaling 122 rural desa and 3 urban kelurahan), and its postal codes.

Name of District (kecamatan)	Area in km^{2}	Pop'n Census 2010	Pop'n Census 2020	Pop'n Estimate mid 2025	Admin centre	No. of villages	Post codes	
72.12.05	Mori Atas	1,508.81	10,418	12,510	14,609	Tomata	14	94965
72.12.04	Lembo	675.23	20,300	14,396	17,941	Beteleme	10	94966
72.12.03	Lembo Raya	657.61	^{(a)}	8,241	9,674	Petumbea	10	94967
72.12.02	Petasia Timur (East Petasia)	509.77	^{(b)}	16,428	29,980	Bungintimbe	12	94963
72.12.01	Petasia ^{(c)}	646.34	33,705	17,997	23,596	Kolonodale	10 ^{(d)}	94971
72.12.10	Petasia Barat (West Petasia)	480.30	^{(b)}	7,711	8,972	Tiu	10	94970
72.12.06	Mori Utara (North Mori)	1,048.93	6,819	8,023	9,794	Mayumba	8	94964
72.12.07	Soyo Jaya	605.51	7,884	8,821	9,977	Lembah Sumara	10	94969
72.12.08	Bungku Utara ^{(e)} (North Bungku)	2,406.79	14,699	15,853	18,114	Beturube	23	94972
72.12.09	Mamosalato	1,464.99	10,269	10,809	12,485	Tanasumpu	14	94968
	Totals	10,004.28	104,094	120,789	155,142		125	

Notes: (a) the 2010 population of Lembo Raya District is included in the figure for Lembo District from which it was cut out in 2013.
(b) the 2010 populations of Petasia Timur and Petasia Barat Districts are included in the figure for Petasia District from which they were cut out in 2013.
(c) including 44 offshore islands. (d) comprising 3 kelurahan (Kolonodale, Bahontula and Bahoue) and 7 desa. (e) including 15 offshore islands.
