= Morowali Regency =

Regency in Central Sulawesi, Indonesia

Morowali Regency Kabupaten Morowali
- Regency
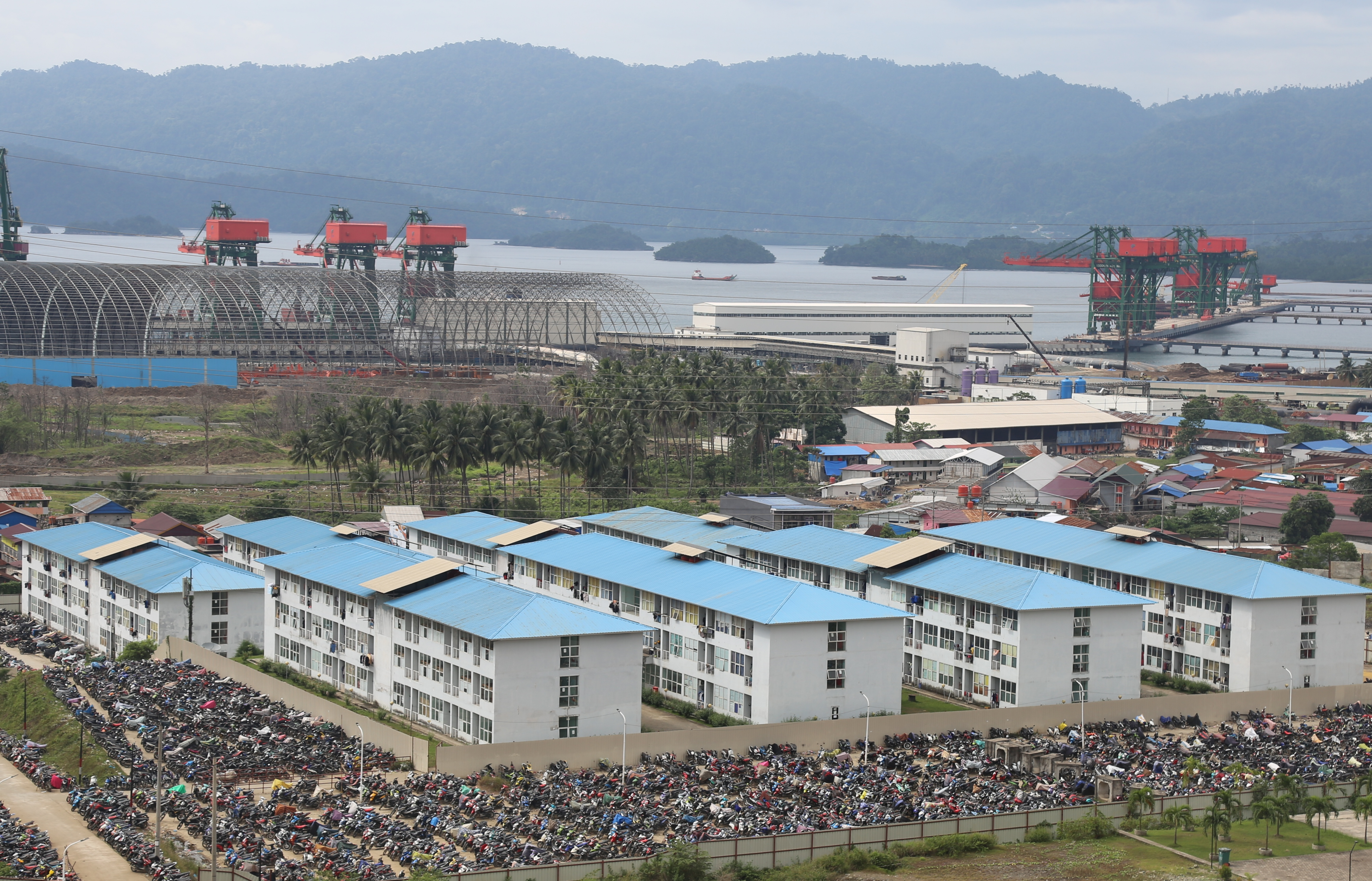
- Morowali Industrial Park

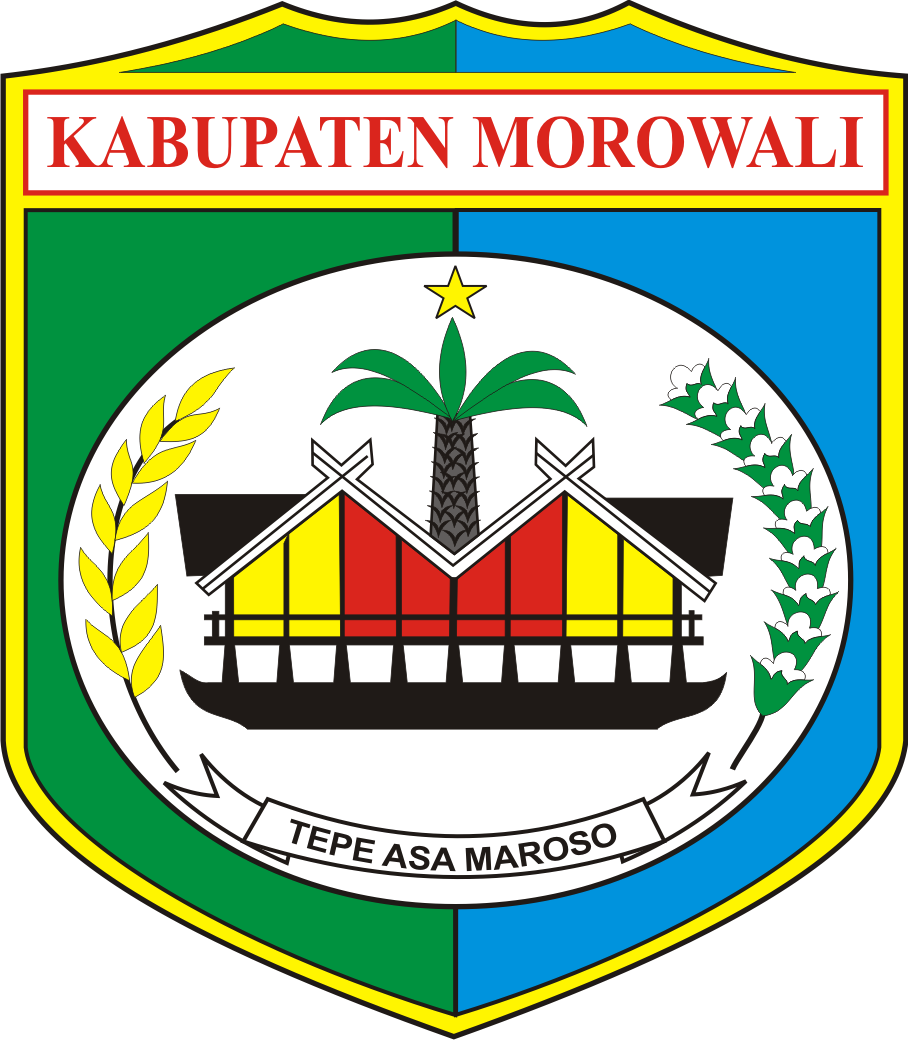
- Coat of arms
- Motto: Tepe Asa Maroso (Pamona) (United We Are Firm)
- Location within Central Sulawesi

- Location in Sulawesi and Indonesia Morowali Regency (Indonesia)
- Coordinates: 2.818536°S 121.860786°E
- Country: Indonesia
- Province: Central Sulawesi
- Capital: Bungku

Government
  - Regent: Iksan Baharudin Abdul Rauf
  - Vice Regent: Iriane Iliyas

Area (as reduced by the separation of North Morowali)
  - Total: 5,472 km^{2} (2,113 sq mi)

Population (mid 2025 estimate)
  - Total: 203,860
  - Density: 37.26/km^{2} (96.49/sq mi)
- Time zone: UTC+8 (ICST)
- Area code: (+62) 464/465
- Website: morowalikab.go.id

Morowali Regency is a regency of Central Sulawesi Province of Indonesia. It covers a land area of 5,472 km^{2}. The districts currently within the regency had a combined population of 102,228 at the 2010 Census; the regency population at the 2020 Census was 161,727; and with rapid growth in the regency's population in recent years the official estimate as of mid 2025 was 203,860 (comprising 107,363 males and 93,559 females). The administrative centre is at the town of Bungku (in Bungku Tengah District), which comprises six kelurahan and a number of desa. The Regency includes the far-flung Menui Islands (Kepulauan Menui), lying to the southeast of the rest of the province.

== History ==
Before Dutch rule, the region comprising what is today Morowali was the territory of the Kingdom of Bungku. After Dutch annexation, it was administered as the landschap of Boengkoe. On 4 October 1999, Morowali Regency was created out of a portion of Poso Regency. At that time it was composed of the southeastern fourteen districts from the Poso Regency.

On 12 April 2013 this Morowali Regency was in turn divided into two Regencies; the seven northernmost districts were split off to form a new North Morowali Regency (Morowali Utara) covering nearly two-thirds of the area of the then Morowali Regency, while the seven southernmost districts were retained as the residual Morowali Regency, although two additional districts were created by the division of existing ones.

=== Economy ===
Morowali Regency contains rich deposits of high-quality nickel, a vital material needed to manufacture lithium batteries. Starting in the 2010s and into the 2020s, the thriving nickel industry in Morowali has resulted in a large increase in the region's GDP (300% increase between 2013 and 2019), but the expansion of the extraction industry has also caused environmental degradation. From 2014 to 2020, over US$6.5 billion in foreign direct investment has flowed into the construction of nickel smelters and other downstream processing activities in Morowali Regency. Morowali is the site of an industrial park, the Morowali Industrial Park, specifically earmarked for refining activities. In Morowali, GDP more than tripled in just six years from Rp 6.9 trillion (US$480 million) in 2013 to Rp 24.3 trillion (US$1.7 billion) in 2019, almost all of it driven by investment in downstream nickel processing. As of 2021, the largest foreign investors were American, Chinese, and Japanese companies, while the government of Indonesia is attempting to build a domestic battery industry.

The growth of this facility has resulted in the rapid expansion in the population, particularly in Bahodopi District where the mine is situated. The increased workforce migrating into the area has been largely male, resulting in a substantively high gender ratio in the regency.

== Administrative districts ==
The Morowali Regency was divided (following the creation of the separate North Morowali Regency in 2013) into seven districts (kecamatan), but two further districts (Bungku Pesisir and Bungku Timur) were later created, and a tenth district (Sombori Islands) was formed in 2022 with ten desa from Menui Islands District and three desa from South Bungku District. These districts are all tabulated below with their areas and their populations at the 2010 Census and 2020 Census, together with the official estimates as of mid 2025. The table also includes the location of the district headquarters, the numbers of administrative villages in each district (totaling 126 rural desa and 7 urban kelurahan), and its postal codes.

Kode Wilayah	Name of District (kecamatan)	Area in km^{2}	Pop'n Census 2010	Pop'n Census 2020	Pop'n Estimate mid 2025	Admin centre	No. of villages	Post codes
72.06.07	Menui Kepulauan ^{(a)} (Menui Islands)	127.65	12,064	13,232	10,719	Ulunambo	14 ^{(b)}	94975
72.06.	Sombori Kepulauan ^{(c)} (Sombori Islands)	267.78	^{(d)}	^{(d)}	5,388	Tanjung Harapan	13	94975
72.06.06	Bungku Selatan ^{(e)} (South Bungku)	232.10	17,273	13,914	15,654	Kaleroang	23	94979
72.06.10	Bahodopi ^{(f)}	1,080.98	6,594	37,322	47,160	Bahodopi	12	94974
72.06.15	Bungku Pesisir (Coastal Bungku)	867.29	^{(g)}	6,625	8,833	Lafeu	10	94981
72.06.05	Bungku Tengah (Central Bungku)	725.57	27,774	29,302	37,228	Marsaoleh	19 ^{(h)}	94973
72.06.18	Bungku Timur (East Bungku)	387.23	^{(g)}	12,061	15,908	Kolono	10	94980
72.06.08	Bungku Barat (West Bungku)	758.93	10,093	14,061	21,330	Wosu	10	94977
72.06.09	Bumi Raya	504.77	11,488	14,524	17,839	Bahonsuai	13	94976
72.06.12	Witaponda	519.70	16,942	20,686	23,801	Laantula Jaya	9	94978
	Totals	5,472.00	102,228	161,727	203,860		133	

Notes: (a) until 2022 this was partly on Sulawesi island (and comprising the most southeastern part of the province), but is now reduced to the island group to the southeast of the rest of the province. The largest islands are Menui Island (Pulau Menui) and the two Padei Islands. (b) including one kelurahan - Ulunambo (with 2,399 inhabitants in 2024).
(c) the Sombori Islands District was formed in 2022 from part of Menui Islands District (10 villages/desa) plus part of South Bungku District (3 villages/desa).
(d) the 2010 and 2020 Census populations are included in the figures for Menui Islands and South Bungku Districts, from which they were taken.
(e) until 2022 this included the Sombori Islands off the south coast of Bungku Selatan. These have now been removed to the newly-formed district of that name.
(f) including the offshore islands of Pulau Manu-Manu (or Pulau Poteang, covering 1.78 km^{2}), Pulau Langala (1.74 km^{2}) and Pulau Kandapute (or Pulau Sidundu, 1.52 km^{2}).
(g) the 2010 populations of Bungku Pesisir District and Bungku Timur District are included in the figures for the Districts from which they were cut out in 2013.
(h) including 6 kelurahan (Bungi, Lamberea, Marsaoleh, Matano, Mendui and Tofoiso).
