= Moluccans =

Ethnic group from the Moluccas Islands

Moluccans Molukker, Moluccas, Orang Maluku
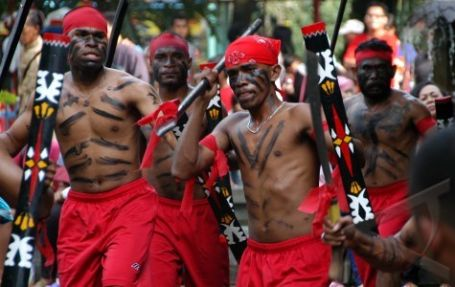
- Moluccan men performing the traditional Cakalele dance, carrying the parang salawaku (Maluku sword and shield)

Total population
- 2.5 million

Regions with significant populations
- Indonesia: 2,203,415 (2010 census) (Maluku, North Maluku, Jakarta, East Java, North Sulawesi, West Papua); Netherlands: c. 70,000 (2018 census)

Languages
- Central–Eastern Malayo-Polynesian languages, North Halmahera languages, North Moluccan Malay, Ambonese Malay, Indonesian, Dutch

Religion
- Majority Sunni Islam; Minority Christianity (Protestantism (Moluccan Evangelical Church and Protestant Church of Maluku) and Roman Catholicism), Hinduism, Animism

Related ethnic groups
- Other Austronesians, Melanesians, Papuan people, Malagasy peoples

Moluccans are the Melanesian-Austronesian ethnic groups indigenous to the Maluku Islands (also called the Moluccas). The region was historically known as the Spice Islands, and today consists of two Indonesian provinces of Maluku and North Maluku. As such, the term Moluccans is used as a blanket term for the various ethnic and linguistic groups native to the islands.

Most Moluccans practice Islam, followed by Christianity. Despite religious differences, all groups share strong cultural bonds and a sense of common identity, such as through Adat. Music is also a binding factor, playing an important role in the cultural identity, and the Moluccan capital city of Ambon was awarded the official status of City of Music by UNESCO in 2019.

As of 2018, a Moluccan diaspora community of c. 70,000 people lives in the Netherlands. This group consists mainly of descendants of soldiers from the former Royal Netherlands East Indies Army, who were evacuated to the Netherlands after the Indonesian invasion of South Maluku in 1950. The remainder are descended from Moluccan servicemen in the Royal Netherlands Navy and civil servants who left Dutch New Guinea after the New York Agreement came into effect in 1962.

However, the vast majority of Moluccans living outside the Maluku Islands are found in surrounding regions, such as Western New Guinea, Timor-Leste, West Timor, North Sulawesi, and further west.

== History ==
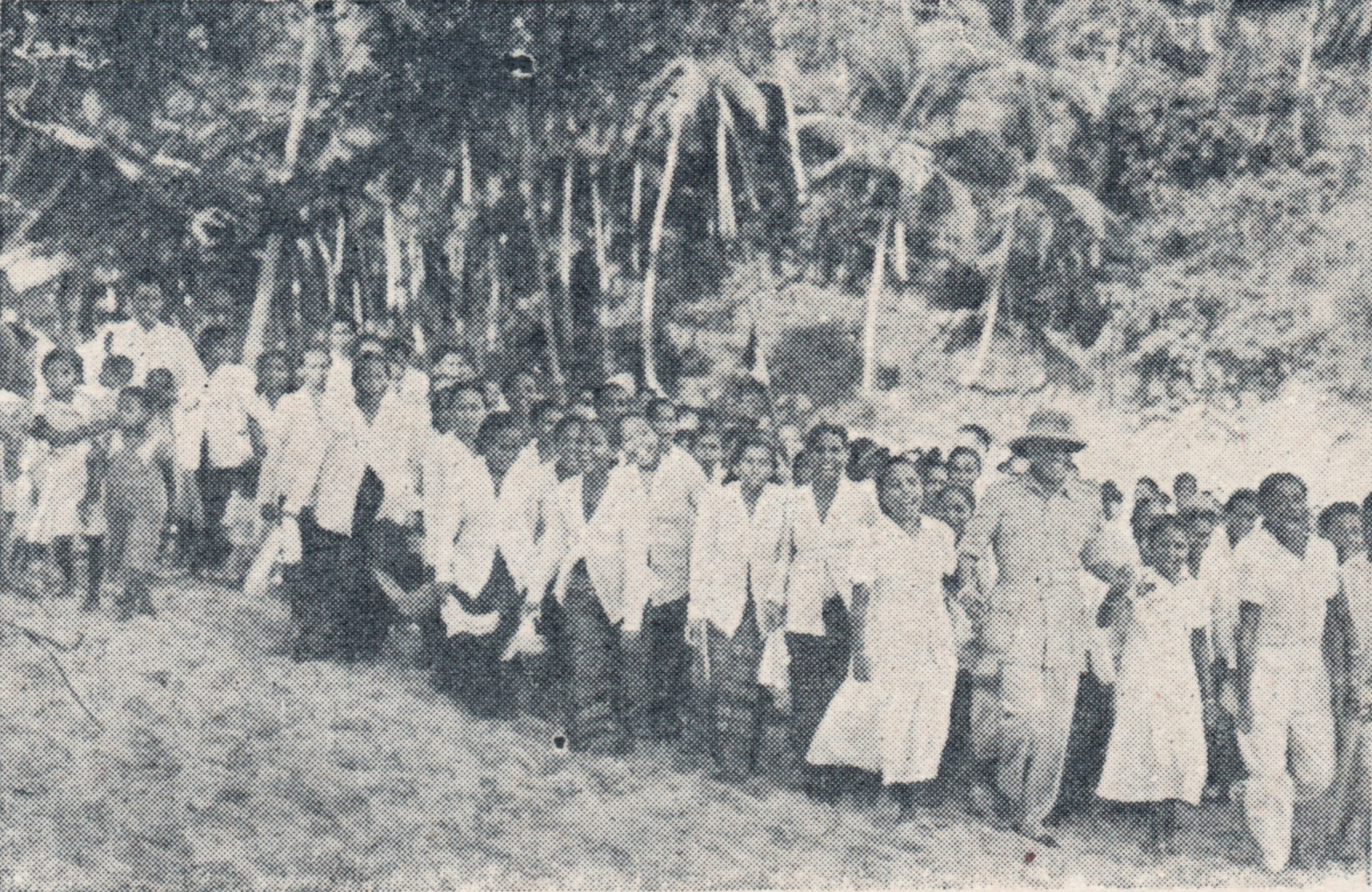
Sukarno dancing with Moluccan people, 1958

The indigenous inhabitants of the Maluku Islands are Melanesian in origin and have been living in the Maluku archipelago since at least 30,000 BCE. However, due to later Austronesian migration waves from around 5,000 - 2,000 BCE, genetic studies detail the presence of varying levels of Austronesian mitochondrial DNA in populations on different islands in Maluku, whereas paternal genetic structure remains predominantly Melanesian in its make-up within the region. This explains a primarily maternal Austronesian influence on the Melanesian population that influenced the development of typical socio-linguistic elements and other areas within the Moluccan culture, making Malayo-Polynesian languages dominating in most of the region, with the exception of some areas where languages belonging to the West Papuan language group are still prevalent. Later added to this were several Dutch, Chinese, Portuguese, Spanish, Arabian and English influences, due to colonization, intermarriage with foreign traders during the Silk-route era and Middle Ages, and even with European soldiers during the World Wars. A small number of German descendants was added to Moluccan population, especially in Ambon, along with arrival of Protestant Missionaries since 16th century.

After the Japanese occupation of the Dutch East Indies during World War II, the Netherlands wished to restore the previous colonial system; however, indigenous Indonesians opposed this. A struggle for independence led by Sukarno and his rebel forces broke out in 1945 and lasted until 1950. The reconstituted Royal Netherlands East Indies Army (KNIL) was commissioned by the Dutch government to maintain order and to disarm the rebels. Moluccan professional soldiers formed an important part of this army. The Moluccan community was thus regarded by the Dutch as allies and vice versa. The government of the Netherlands had promised Moluccans that they would get their own free state and independence back in return for assisting the Netherlands. After international efforts could not support the Netherlands to maintain its colony, the Dutch government chose to no longer keep its promise to Moluccans of an independent state. Moluccans, who were seen by the Indonesians as collaborators with the Dutch, were given two options: to demobilize the military force and "temporarily" go to the Netherlands before returning to an independent Maluku, or to assimilate and take on the Indonesian nationality. Most Moluccans who served in the command of KNIL chose the first option, which was to reside temporarily in the Netherlands. Upon arriving in the Netherlands, Moluccans were discharged from military service, and housed in repurposed WWII concentration camps, including in the former Westerbork transit camp, where they were isolated from Dutch society and held under extremely poor living conditions for years.

Maluku Islands

The Dutch Moluccan community repeatedly petitioned the Dutch government to uphold its commitment to supporting their claim for an independent Republic of South Maluku, as previously promised. Their struggle for independence began to gain traction in the 1970s, when demonstrations and violence propelled them into the public eye. Finally, after still being ignored and denied a hearing by the government, a number of hostage-takings were committed by the Free South Moluccan Youths as a means to gain attention on the matter. These included the Wijster train hijacking and Indonesian consulate hostage crisis in 1975, the De Punt train hijacking and Bovensmilde school hostage crisis in 1977, and the Assen province hall hostage crisis in 1978, which, in total, resulted in the death of seven civilians and seven hostage-takers.

== Languages ==
Moluccans speak over a hundred different languages, with a majority of them belonging to the Central Malayo-Polynesian language family. An important exception is the North Moluccan islands which include the island of Halmahera and its surrounding islands, where the majority of the population speak West Papuan languages (North Halmahera branch), possibly brought through historical migration from the Bird's Head Peninsula of New Guinea. Another exception are the Malay-based creoles such as the Ambonese language (also known as Ambonese Malay), spoken mainly on Ambon and the nearby Ceram; and North Moluccan Malay used on the islands of Ternate, Tidore, Halmahera and Sula Islands in North Maluku. Moluccans living in the Netherlands mostly speak Ambonese and Buru, as well as the national and official Dutch language.

== Ethnic groups ==
The Moluccans homeland is divided into two provinces which are part of the Maluku Islands, namely the provinces of Maluku and North Maluku. Each has ethnic diversity, there are many different ethnic groups in Maluku Islands, and they are a mixture of Austronesian and Melanesian.

=== Maluku province ===
- Alune people
- Ambonese people
  - Haruku people
  - Hitu people
  - Saparua people
- Aru people
  - Ujir people
- Babar people
- Banda people
- Bati people
- Buano people
- Buru people
  - Ambelau people
  - Kayeli people
  - Lisela people
  - Masarete people
  - Rana people
  - Wai Apu people
  - Wai Loa people
- Geser people
- Gorom people
- Kei people
  - Tanimbar Kei people
- Kisar people
- Leti people
- Manipa people
- Masela people
- Mausu Ane people
- Meher people
- Nuaulu people
- Oirata people
- Tanimbarese people
- Teon–Nila–Serua (TNS)
  - Nila people
  - Serua people
  - Teon people
- Teor people
- Von people
- Wemale people
- Wetar people
- Yamatitam people

=== North Maluku province ===
- Bacan people
- Buli people
- Galela people
- Gamkonora people
- Gane people
- Gebe people
- Gorap people
- Ibu people
- Maba people
- Makian people
- Modole people
- Kao people
- Kayoa people
- Pagu people
- Patani people
- Sahu people
- Sawai people
- Sula people
  - Mangole people
- Tabaru people
- Taliabu people
- Ternate people
- Tidore people
  - Mare people
- Tobelo people
  - Boeng people
  - Togutil people
- Waioli people
- Weda people

== Religion ==
Most Moluccans in northern Maluku (present-day province of North Maluku) are Muslim. Central and southern Maluku (present-day province of Maluku) have approximately equal numbers of Muslims and Christians.

There is significant number of native Hindus (Tanimbar Kei people) living in the Kei Islands, which is a predominantly Catholic region. This is because, according to oral traditions, their ancestors came from Bal (Bali) during the Majapahit era. Additionally, they practice local customary law called Larvul Ngabal (transl. "red blood and spear from Bali").

The most common religion amongst Moluccans in the Netherlands is Protestantism, followed by Islam.

== See also ==
- Proto-Malay
- Malagasy people
- Republic of South Maluku
