= Wai Apu people =

Indonesian ethnic group

Wai Apu
Total population
- 3,691 (1971)

Regions with significant populations
- Indonesia (Buru Regency)

Languages
- Buru (Wai Apu dialect), Ambonese Malay, and Indonesian

Religion
- Indigenous belief, Islam, and Christianity

Related ethnic groups
- Other Alifuru peoples

The Wai Apu people are an ethnic group that are the indigenous inhabitants of Buru Island in the province of Maluku, Indonesia. The name of this ethnic group is taken from its distribution area, namely around the Waeapo River, usually inhabiting the northeastern region of the island which is now known as the districts of Namlea and Waplau. Research from the Indonesian Ministry of Social Affairs in 1971 numbers the Wai Apu population at approximately 3,691.

== Religion ==
The creator Opolastala formed Mount Date and Lake Rana, together a region termed Bumilale, as the source of life for humanity. Accordingly Bumilale occupies a central position within the Wai Apu belief system, conceptualised as a paradise surpassing all other regions in its beauty, one which must be protected from outside harm to preserve its harmony.

In the Wai Apu cosmology, Buru Island (Bupolo) is likened metaphorically to a human, with the various geographic features representing anatomical features:

1. Head: Mount Kapalatmada
2. Left hand: Wanibe River
3. Right hand: Waemala River
4. Back: Garan Forest
5. Stomach: Lake Rana
6. Genitals: Mount Date
7. Left foot: Waeapo River
8. Right foot: Mount Batakbual

== See also ==
- Moluccans
- Buru people
- Wai Loa people
