= Rana people =

Ethnic group in Indonesia

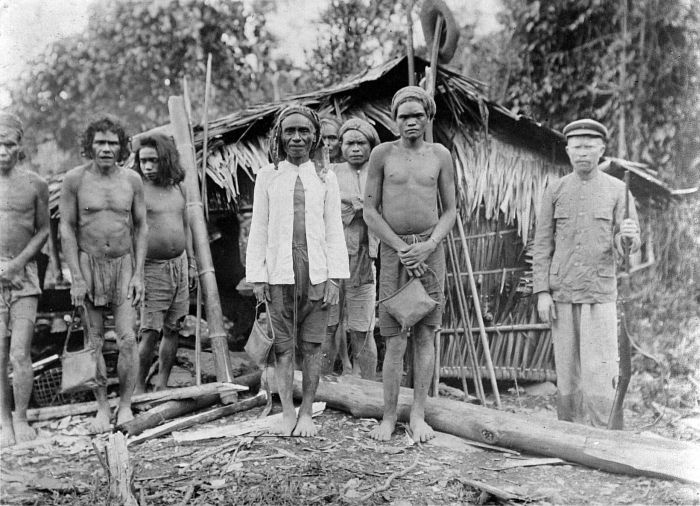
- The Rana people from the southeastern area of Lake Rana.

Total population
- 3,454 (1971)

Regions with significant populations
- Indonesia (Buru Island)

Languages
- Buru (Rana dialect), Ambonese Malay, and Insonesian

Religion
- Islam (48%), Christianity (20%), and animism (32%)

Related ethnic groups
- Buru • Lisela • Kayeli

The Rana people is an ethnic group that inhabits the central part of Buru Island. They live in the area of Lake Rana, which is located in the district of Fena Leisela, Buru Regency, Maluku Province, Indonesia. They are one of the ethnic groups classified as indigenous people on Buru Island, besides the Ambelau, Buru, Kayeli, Masarete, Lisela, Wai Apu, and Wai Loa. The Rana people belong to the Polynesian race. They have physical characteristics with an average height of 1.50–1.60 cm, have a mature brown skin color, eyes are not too thin and lips are not thick with hair. The Social Department includes the Rana people in the category of uncontacted ethnic groups.

Buru Island is the second largest island with an area of 8,473.2 square kilometers after Seram Island in the province of Maluku, which has a coastline of 427.2 km. In the middle of the Buru Island mountains there is a lake called Lake Rana. This lake is the largest lake in the province of Maluku with an elevation of 700 meters above sea level. The lake is considered a sacred place by the native people. The Rana people believe that their ancestors are gods who live on the slopes of the mountains and Lake Rana.

== Population ==
Buru Island with its territorial division in 1850, the distribution of the Rana people is around Lake Rana in the middle of the island.

The Rana are the indigenous people of Buru Island. Some were born from marriages between indigenous people and immigrants and there are also immigrants who settled on the island. In 1971, the total number of Rana people was 3,454. The Rana people's villages around Lake Rana include Waegrahe, Kaktuan, Waemite, Waelo, Trukat, Waegeren, and others.

Geographically, the Rana people are divided into 3 groups, namely the Wai Nibe River Valley group, which numbers 1,013 people, the most scattered in 10 villages. The Wai Geren River Valley group has a total of 592 people and is spread across 10 villages and finally the Rana Lake Pain group has a total of 1,849 people who are spread across 10 villages.

== Livelihood ==
The main source of livelihood of the Rana people is farming. The Rana farming methods are still very traditional such as logging and nomadic cultivation. The crops that the Rana people plant are rice, corn, sweet potatoes, sweet potatoes, beans and hotong (a kind of wheat). In addition, the Rana people raise pigs, chickens and goats. They harvest forest products for resin and rattan and also hunt and fish as a livelihood.

The tools used to cut down the forest are iron tools, machetes, small hoes (horses) and task tools. To catch fish Rana people use fishing rods, trawl land (awlo). To hunt the Rana people use traps. The spearhead is poisoned so that the animal hit by the spear dies quickly.

When the first harvest Rana people have a tradition of Wahadegan where the results of the first harvest is not sold but eaten with all the villagers, if the harvest is abundant neighbors are invited to eat together. This tradition is held every first harvest of all types of food crops.

== Language ==
Only 10% of Rana people can use Indonesian when interacting with foreigners. There are 2 types of languages used, namely liam-liam language used in everyday life, then liam garam language used at certain times such as customary ceremonies by the head or customary elders. They are speakers of the Buru language (Rana dialect), which belongs to the Austronesian language family.

== Culture ==
=== Traditional clothing ===
The Rana people of the Geba Karu Mountains still adhere to traditional clothing. However, many people now wear traditional clothing. The Rana people who live in coastal areas are relatively more advanced than those in the mountains. They often wear kebaya, sarong, and other traditional clothing. Men usually wear bracelets and rings to ward off calamity and disease. While for women using necklaces, bracelets and rings are as decorations as a tool of attraction or lure.

=== Traditional house ===
The houses of the Rana people are mostly made of wood. The wooden poles of the house are round. Some houses are in the shape of a stage house. The walls of the house are made of bark or grass. The Rana house does not use nails, certain parts are tied with rattan and do not have windows and room divisions. Although simple, there are decorations in the house like skulls, animal shapes, bird wings and others. Usually one Rana house is occupied by two to three families.

=== Kinship system ===
The kinship system that prevails in the Rana people is a patrilineal kinship system drawing the lineage from the male side after performing patrilocal marriage. There are batih families or combinations of nuclear families forming a unit of kinship based on a common ancestor. In the division of inheritance, the husband and wife have an equal share.

=== Traditional wedding ===
The Rana people like the same marriage that is the nature of giving each other to the bride that the Rana people call matukar. There are also families who give conditions to men who want to become daughters-in-law must enter their soa.

Match selection is exogamous (marrying out) soa. The soa is a union of relatives living in several villages). This marriage is the responsibility of the members of the soa.

The man must give the woman a dowry (kupang). The kupang usually given are several pieces of gong, several meters of white cloth, several pieces of cloth sarong, several dozen plates, cups, several blades (parang), a few pans and a few pigs. Although maskawin given a lot but this is not so giving because it is borne by the soa.

The dowry is divided into three types, namely gau, the part given to the parents of the prospective wife. The fena kupang shells, given to members of soa, given to the head of soa. In villages where the community is Christians, kupang remains a customary requirement but stoppe for the head of soa is replaced with money. For the village where the majority of the population is Muslims, most dowry are replaced by money.

There is a marriage in the same way as engagement (himlao) where the man engages when the girl is just born. If you can not afford to pay kupang there are those who do marriage run away (hakafian) because they love each other and not approved by parents and there are also men who dedicate themselves to their parents-in-law since their future wives are still small as a replacement kupang (bauta).

=== Birth and death traditions ===
If there are children born from marriage then it will be governed by certain customs. Until the age of three months, the baby is only allowed to be seen by the mother and father, others are not allowed to see the baby. Only the mother can take care of and regulate the food consumed by her baby. This affects the health of the mother and baby and becomes one of the factors of high infant mortality rates in the Rana people.

If a Rana dies, the body is bathed and then placed on a mat or bark and covered with a white cloth. Then the body is buried and put in the grave. The Rana people do not have a cemetery complex but are scattered in various places.

=== Organization system ===
The Rana people recognize hereditary leadership. The Rana people call the customary head the same title raja or upulatu as the highest leader. The raja was assisted by the hinolog, the head of the soa, the head of the village (pervision), and the head of the klea (area). The closest assistant is called hinolong who has the task of managing all the heads of soa. The heads of soa are assisted by an advisory council of customary leaders called gebantuan. A soa usually lives in the same village.

== Religion ==
According to the Social Department's survey team in 1975, 20% of the Rana people had converted to Christianity, some of adhere to Islam (48%). Especially the Rana people who are around the coast have many who follow the religion. However, there are still Rana people who still have their native beliefs, namely animism (32%).

The Rana peole have a belief called Opulastala where the Rana believe that there is one supreme power that created the universe. The Rana people also have a belief called koin or lekoit, which is the belief that there is an old element in nature that has supernatural powers. They believe in the spirits of their ancestors and subtle beings who they believe can give them help, safety and happiness. There is a captain spirit that can help when the enemy attacks called fufuan.

The Rana people also believe that there are subtle creatures called Anane, Gebrahe, and Gebuse who help them. Anane in the mountains help them when hunting, Gebrahe in the ground and help when planting and getting a bountiful harvest, and Gebuse helped bring rain and helped to get enough fish when fishing. In addition to the helpful subtle creatures, it is believed that there are evil subtle creatures that will occasionally disturb the Rana people.

== See also ==
- Ethnic groups in Indonesia
- Buru people
- Lisela people
- Wai Apu people
