= Kayeli =

Kayeli may refer to:

- the Kayeli people
- the Kayeli language
