= Namniwel Airport =

Namniwel Airport Bandar Udara Namniwel
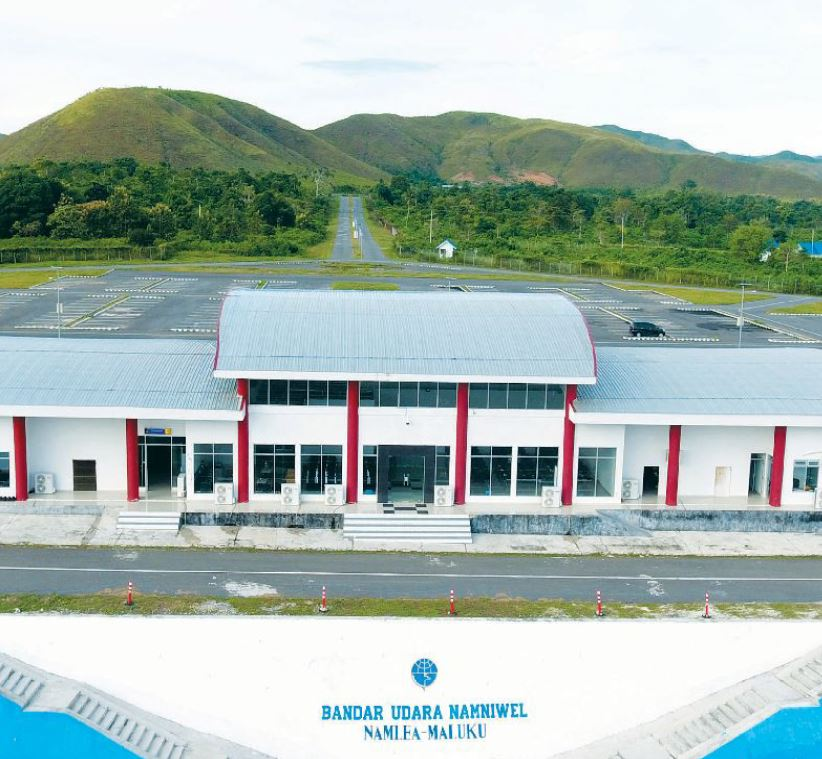
- IATA: NAM; ICAO: WAPN

Summary
- Airport type: Public
- Owner: Government of Indonesia
- Operator: UPT Ditjen Hubud
- Serves: Namlea
- Location: Namlea, Buru island, Maluku Islands, Indonesia
- Time zone: WITA (UTC+09:00)
- Elevation AMSL: 41 ft / 12 m
- Coordinates: 003°14′13″S 127°06′01″E
- Website: hubud.kemenhub.go.id/upbu/namniwel

Map
- Location of the airport in Namlea, Buru

Runways
Direction	Length		Surface
Direction	ft	m	Surface
11/29		1,600	Asphalt

Namniwel Airport (Indonesian: Bandar Udara Namniwel) (IATA: NAM, ICAO: WAPN) is a domestic airport serving Buru Regency, Maluku, Indonesia.The airport is located in Namlea District on Buru Island and is operated by the Technical Implementation Unit of the Directorate General of Civil Aviation.

== History ==
Construction of Namniwel Airport was completed in 2015. The airport was inaugurated, conducted its first test landing, and was declared ready for operation in November 2017. Commercial flights commenced in December 2017 when Wings Air began operating ATR 72 services between Pattimura Airport in Ambon and Namniwel Airport.

== Facilities ==
Namniwel Airport is a Class III airport operated by the Directorate General of Civil Aviation. The airport has a runway measuring 1,600 x 30 metres, a taxiway measuring 185 x 12 metres, and an apron measuring 130 x 70 metres.

The passenger terminal has an area of 1,350 square metres and yearly capacity of 20,838 passengers.

== Airlines and destinations ==
Airlines	Destinations
Wings Air	Ambon
