= Lisela =

Lisela may refer to:

- the Lisela people
- the Lisela language
