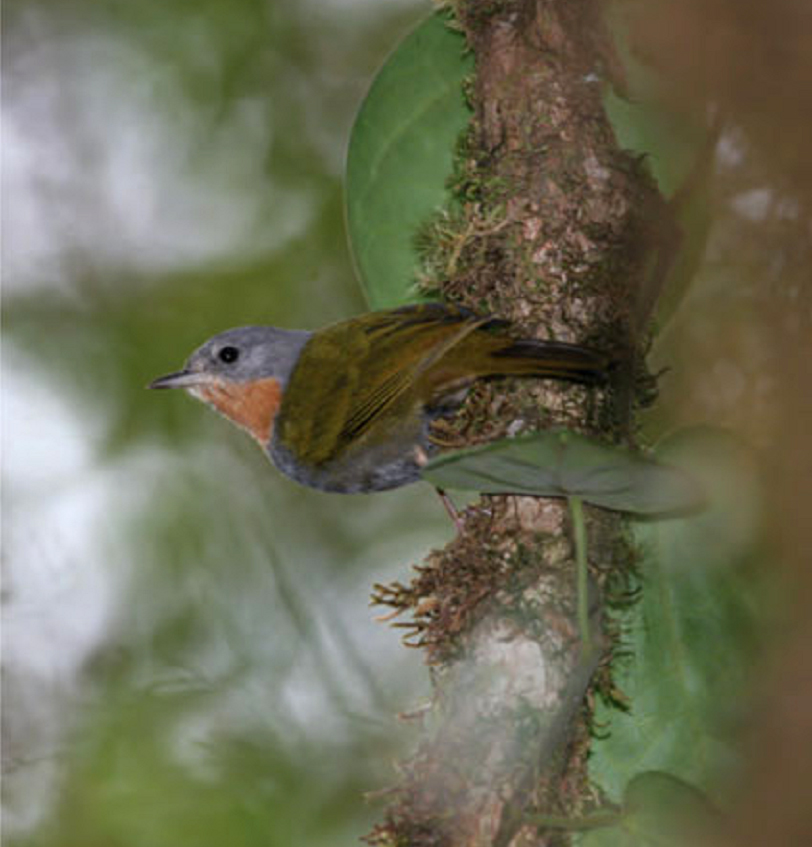

Conservation status
- Near Threatened (IUCN 3.1)

Scientific classification
- Kingdom: Animalia
- Phylum: Chordata
- Class: Aves
- Order: Passeriformes
- Family: Motacillidae
- Genus: Anthus
- Species: A. ruficollis

Binomial name
- Anthus ruficollis (Rothschild & Hartert, 1923)

Synonyms
- Madanga ruficollis

= Madanga =

Species of bird

The madanga or rufous-throated white-eye (Anthus ruficollis) is a species of bird that was formerly included in the family Zosteropidae but is now thought to be an atypical member of the family Motacillidae, consisting of the pipits and wagtails. Its close relatives are tree pipits of the genus Anthus, and is endemic to the moist, mountainous, subtropical and tropical forest of the Indonesian island Buru. The bird was initially described from four specimens collected in April 1922 from one area in the western part of the island, near the settlement Wa Fehat, at elevations between 820 and 1,500 m (2,690 and 4,920 ft). These observations were reproduced on two birds in December 1995 at Wakeika, at an elevation of 1,460 m (4,790 ft); changes in the bird's habitat at Wa Fehat were also noted in 1995. The bird was observed only in a few localities and neither its habitat area nor population is reliably known. The population is estimated at more than several hundred individuals, and the habitat at several hundred km^{2} from the available area above 1,200 m (872 km²) and above 1,500 m (382 km²); the birds are believed to disperse over their habitat rather than form groups. Because the species is restricted to a single island and its habitat is threatened by logging and other human activities, it is listed as endangered by the IUCN since 1996.

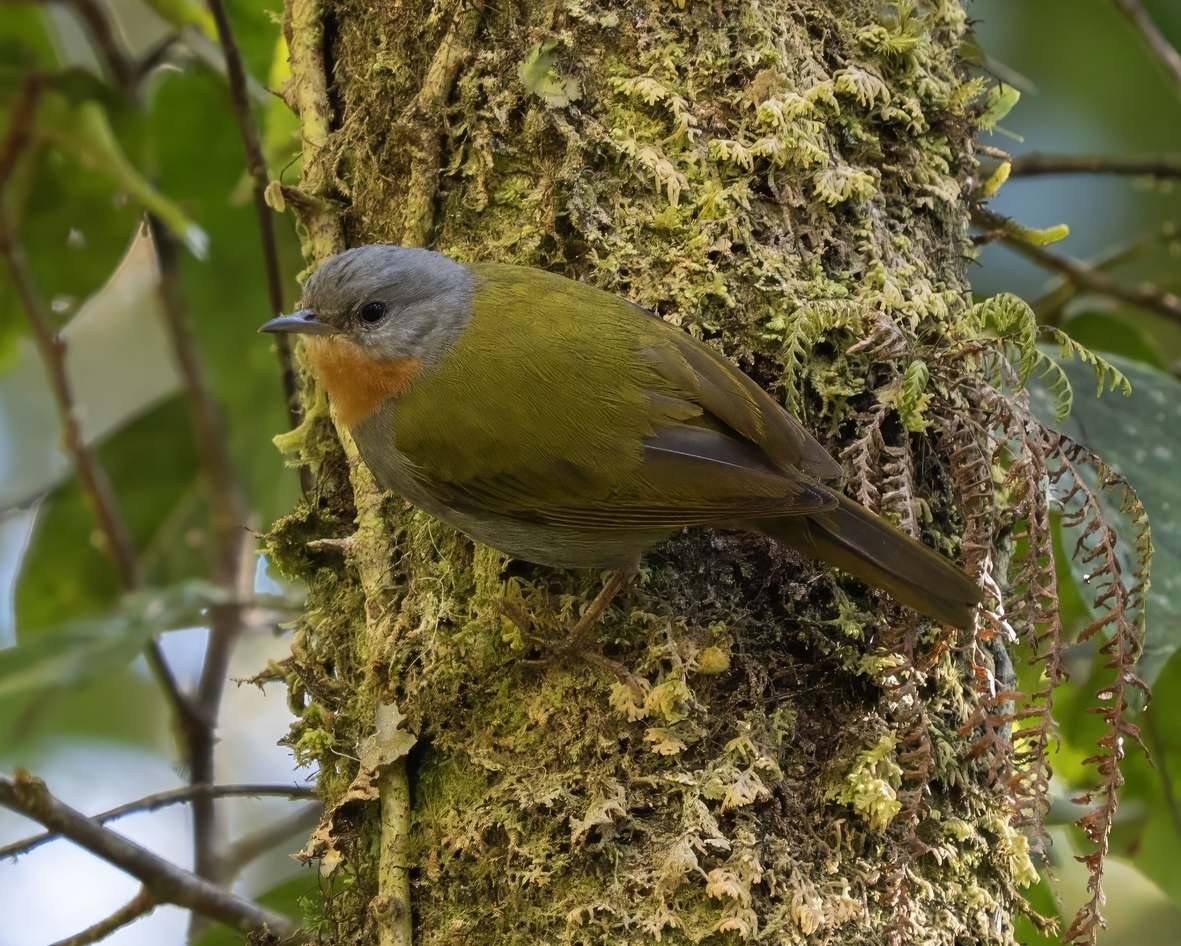
Madanga sighted during expedition to Mount Kapalatmada in 2026

The madanga most likely eats small invertebrates recovered from bark and lichen. The bird has distinct coloration and body features, namely lack of a white eye-ring; longer toes, wing and tail, and the pointed shape of the rectrices (part of the tail).

A 2015 DNA analysis indicates the species is more closely related to the pipits than the white-eyes, and some taxonomic authorities now tend to regard it as being a member of the family Motacillidae within the clade containing pipits in the genus Anthus.
