= Neoserica buruana =

Scientific classification
- Kingdom: Animalia
- Phylum: Arthropoda
- Clade: Pancrustacea
- Class: Insecta
- Order: Coleoptera
- Suborder: Polyphaga
- Infraorder: Scarabaeiformia
- Family: Scarabaeidae
- Genus: Neoserica
- Species: N. buruana

Binomial name
- Neoserica buruana (Moser, 1916)

Synonyms
- Autoserica buruana Moser, 1916

Species of beetle

Neoserica buruana is a species of beetle of the family Scarabaeidae. It is found in Indonesia (Buru).

== Description ==
Adults reach a length of about 7.5 mm. They are dull and yellowish-red. The frons is tomentose, with a few setae behind the suture. The punctation of the pronotum is difficult to discern due to the dense tomentum covering. The front and lateral margins are covered with erect setae, and some setae are also present on the disc of the pronotum. The elytra have regular rows of punctures, with the interstices mostly unpunctate.
