= Moluccan Evangelical Church =

The Moluccan Evangelical Church (Dutch: Molukse Evangelische Kerk; Indonesian: Geredja Indjili Maluku, abbreviated GIM) is a Reformed church in the Netherlands. 12,500 Moluccans arrived in the Netherlands in 1951 as a consequence of decolonization, and today they number 40,000. The Reformed Moluccans are descended from the Protestant Church of Maluku. The GIM is the largest of at least eighteen Moluccan Reformed churches in the Netherlands. It had approximately 11,215 members as of 2004.
