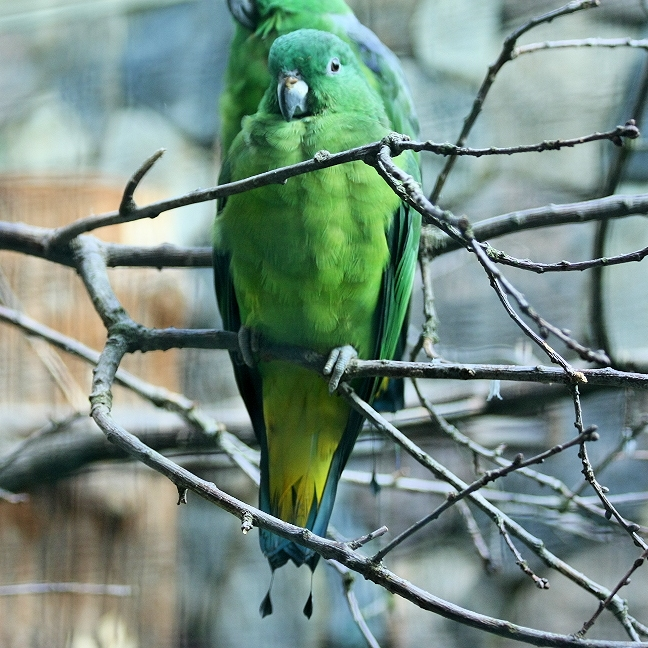
- Female with male in background
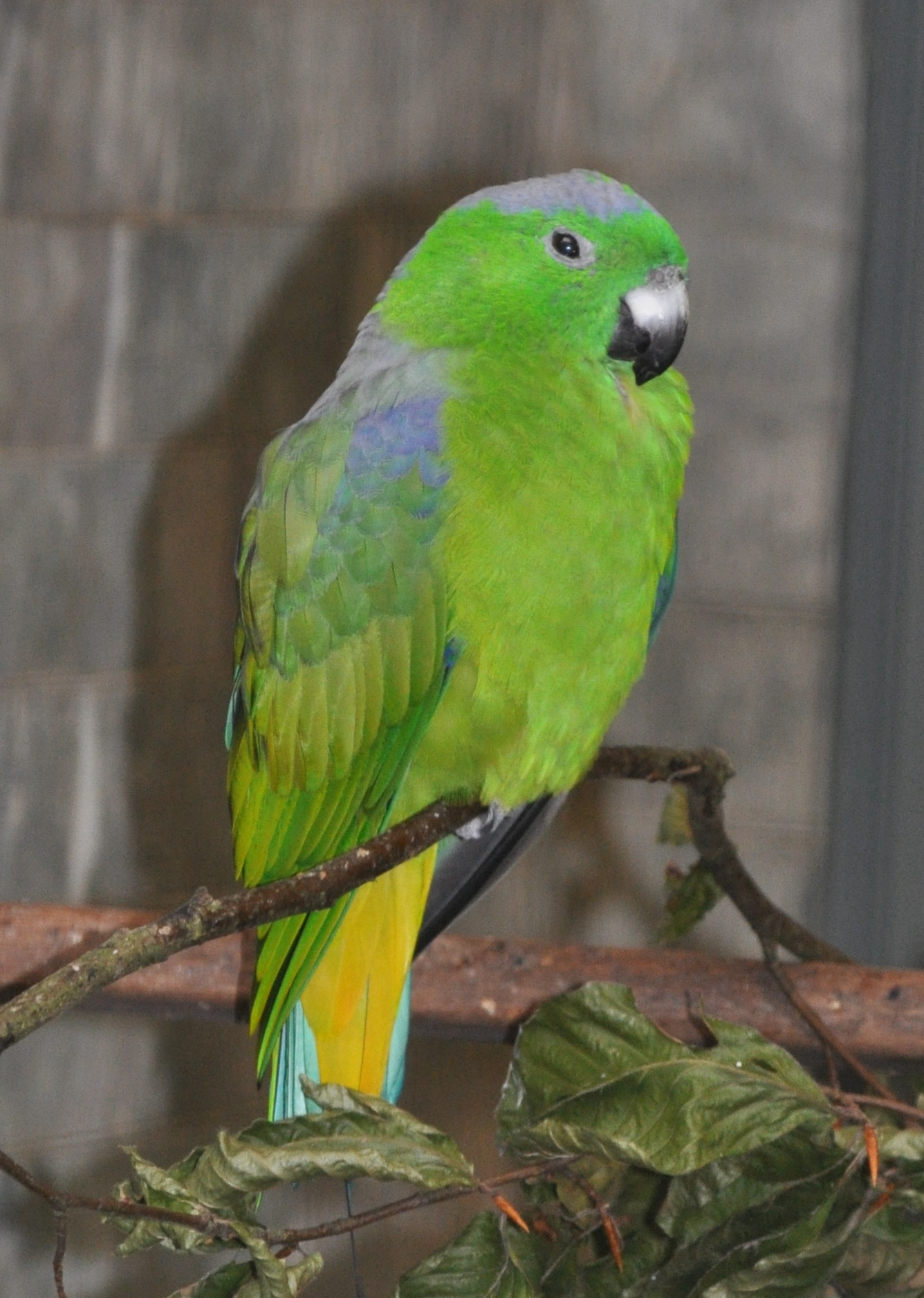
- Male at Walsrode Bird Park

Conservation status
- Least Concern (IUCN 3.1)

Scientific classification
- Kingdom: Animalia
- Phylum: Chordata
- Class: Aves
- Order: Psittaciformes
- Family: Psittaculidae
- Genus: Prioniturus
- Species: P. mada

Binomial name
- Prioniturus mada Hartert, 1900
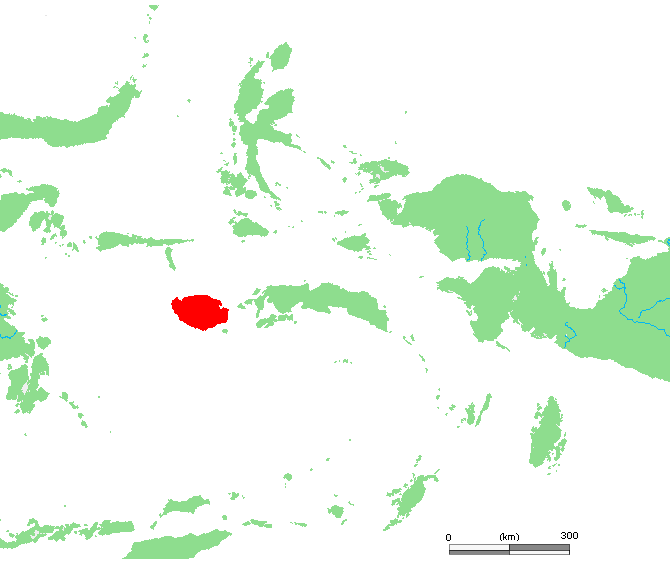
- The Indonesian island of Buru, its range, in red

= Buru racket-tail =

Species of bird

The Buru racket-tail (Prioniturus mada), is a species of parrot in the family Psittaculidae. It is endemic to the forest on the island of Buru, one of the Maluku Islands of Indonesia.

== Description ==
The Buru racket-tail is a mainly green parrot about 32 cm (13 in) long. The beak is blackish and lighter at the base, and the long undertail-coverts are yellow. The adult male has blue upper-parts from the back of its head to mid-back and which extends into the upper surfaces of the forewings. The female has a small area of blue on the nape. Juveniles do not have racket-shaped tail feathers. The male juvenile has a little blue on the nape and the female juvenile has all-green upper-parts.

== Range and Distribution ==
The Buru racket-tail is endemic to the Indonesian island of Buru in the Maluku Islands archipelago. There have been no other sightings of wild Prioniturus mada outside the island of Buru.

== Habitat ==
Prioniturus mada is usually found in elevations up to approximately 1600 meters where it is found in many different types of forest habitat. It is commonly seen in both old-growth forest and taller secondary forest. It is also usually found in the remaining trees of cultivated areas such as in farms and small villages.

== Ecology ==
The Buru racket-tail is usually found in flocks of up to 10 birds. They are seasonally nomadic birds that travel to where fruiting trees are blooming in the mountains. The diet of Prioniturus mada mainly consists of wild fruits, seeds, berries, and flowers. Females usually lay a clutch of up to five eggs. The known breeding season for the Buru racket-tail is from December–February.

== Threats ==
Like most other Indonesian birds, the Buru racket-tail is threatened by habitat destruction due to deforestation to make ways for plantations (especially palm oil), logging, and mining operations. This bird is also threatened by trapping for the exotic pet trade.

== Cited texts ==
- Forshaw, Joseph M. (2006). Parrots of the World; an Identification Guide. Illustrated by Frank Knight. Princeton University Press. ISBN 0-691-09251-6.
