= Namrole Airport =

- IATA: NRE; ICAO: WAPG

Summary
- Airport type: Public
- Operator: Government
- Location: Buru island, Maluku Islands, Indonesia
- Time zone: WITA (UTC+09:00)
- Coordinates: 03°51′21″S 126°41′59″E

Map
- Location of the airport in Namrole, Buru

Runways
Direction	Length		Surface
Direction	ft	m	Surface
	6,070	1,850	Asphalt
- Sources: AirportNavFinder, DAFIF

Namrole Airport (IATA: NRE, ICAO: WAPG) is a public airport on Buru island, which is one of the Maluku Islands in Indonesia.

The airport is operated and managed by the government.

== Passengers ==
In 2018, the airport served 24,574 passengers with 350 arrivals and 350 departures. It could serve ATR 42 aircraft.
