= Waeapo River =

River in Maluku, Indonesia

Waeapo River Wae Apo, Way Apu, Apo
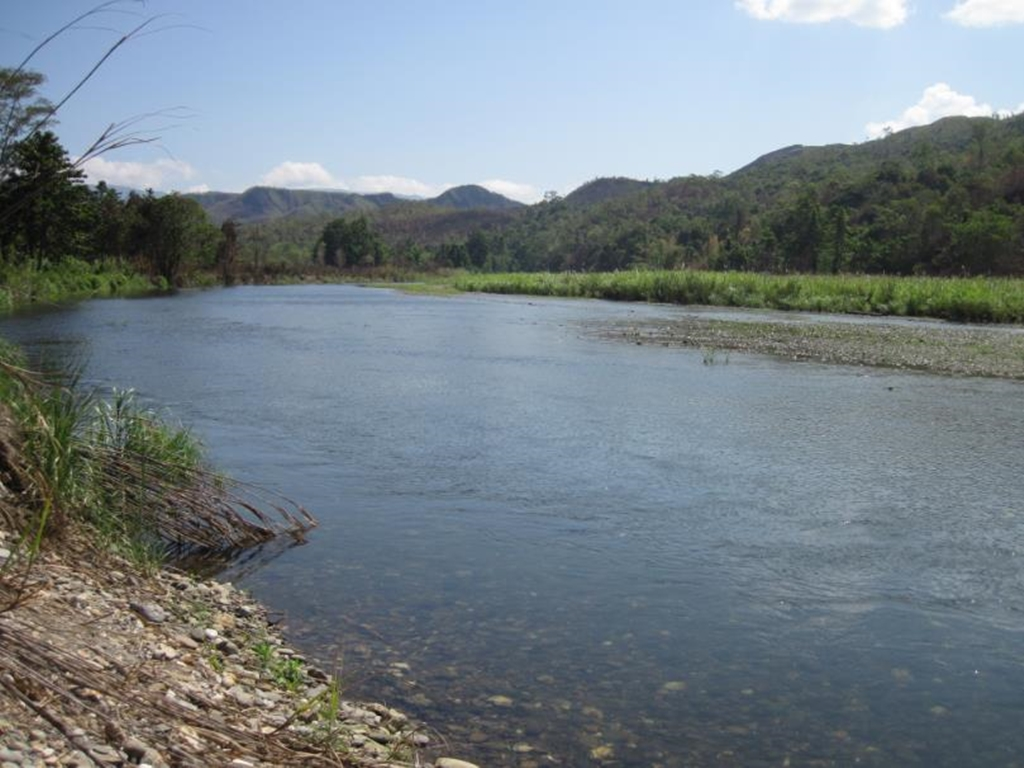
- The Waeapo River

- Location of river mouth

Location
- Country: Indonesia
- Province: Maluku
- Regency: Buru; South Buru

Physical characteristics
- Mouth: Banda Sea
  - coordinates: 3°19′34″S 127°4′21″E
- Length: 80 km (50 mi) to 47.22 km (29.34 mi)
- Basin size: 1,800 km^{2} (690 mi^{2}) to 1,891.4 km^{2} (730.3 mi^{2})
- Discharge
  - location: Near mouth
  - average: (Period: 1971–2000)46.3 m^{3}/s (1,640 cu ft/s) (Period: 2003–2015)65.3 m^{3}/s (2,310 cu ft/s)

Basin features
- River system: Waeapo River

The Waeapo River is a river which flows on the island of Buru, Maluku, Indonesia. It is one of the main rivers of the island, draining towards the Banda Sea in the northeast of the island.

== History ==
Following the communist purges in the 1960s, thousands of political prisoners were incarcerated in Buru, and they were mostly placed around the Waeapo River valley. This was partly due to the valley's topographic features, being surrounded by continuous steep cliffs. As the river was navigable, it was used to transport prisoners inland. The lower Waeapo valley later became a destination for Javanese transmigrants, with over 20,000 settlers moving into settlements on the Waeapo River's floodplain and establishing rice fields. The Waeapo valley remains the concentration of nearly all rice agriculture in Buru.

Since 2012, due to gold mining activities in a nearby mountain, mercury has begun leaching into the river, although 2015 measurements indicated acceptable levels. Further illegal gold mining continued to pollute the river and its tributaries with mercury. In August 2020, dam construction began in the river to provide water for irrigation systems and an expected electrical production of 8 MW.

== Geography ==
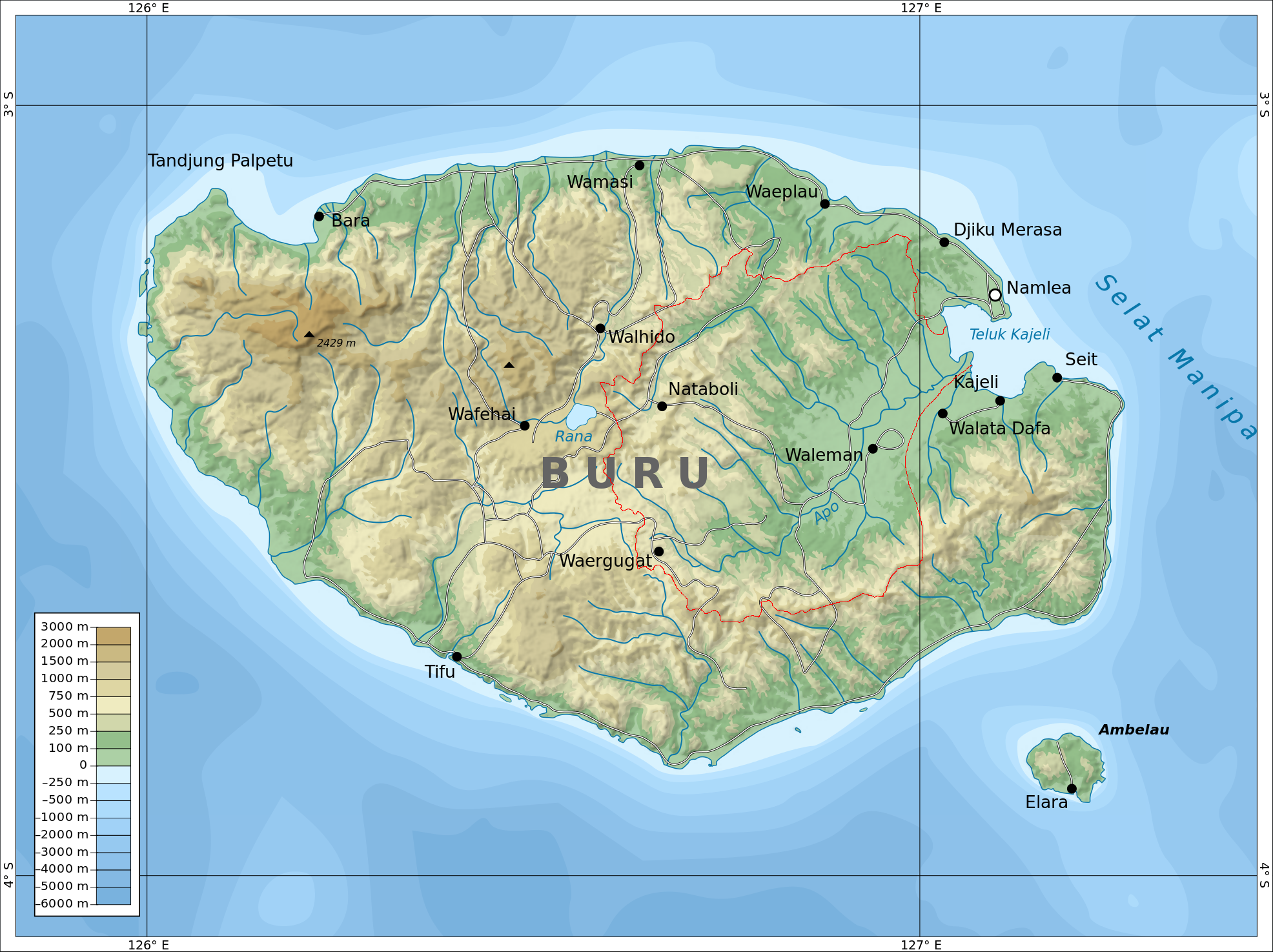
Waeapo River ("Apo") flowing to "Teluk Kajeli" on the northeast coast of Buru. Red line marks approximate watershed boundaries.

The river valley forms an alluvial plain in the northeast of the island, which comprised the Waeapo district of Buru Regency. It is the largest alluvial plain in Buru, with a basin area of around 1,800 square kilometers. It drains into the Kayeli Bay in the northeast of the island, which is connected to the Banda Sea. The river floods annually during monsoon season.

The river's mouth is a mangrove swamp, the largest on the island.

== See also ==
- List of drainage basins of Indonesia
