= Buru people =

Ethnic group in Indonesia

Gebfuka, Gebemliar
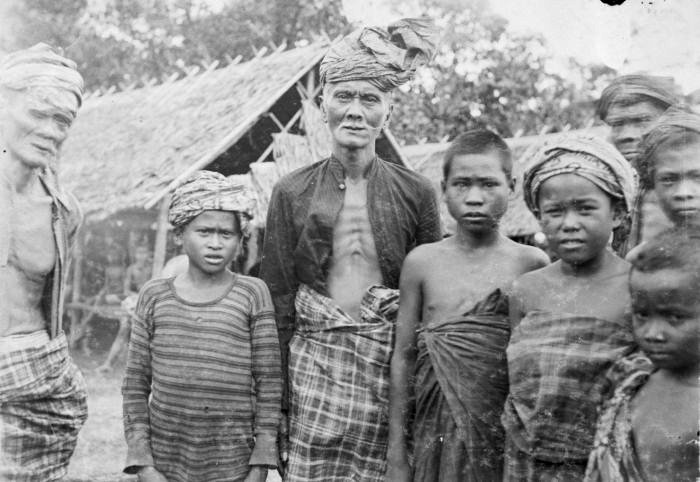
- Buru people in folk costume, early 1900s.

Total population
- 35,000

Regions with significant populations
- Indonesia (Buru): 33,000

Languages
- Sula–Buru languages (Buru language), Indonesian language

Religion
- Islam, Christianity, Animism

Related ethnic groups
- Lisela, Kayeli, Ambelau

The Buru people (Indonesian: Orang Buru) is an ethnic group mostly living on the Indonesian island of Buru, as well as on some other Maluku Islands. They also call themselves Gebfuka or Gebemliar, which literally means "people of the world" or "people of the land". Buru people are related to the eastern Indonesian anthropological group and from an ethnographic point of view are similar to other indigenous peoples of the island Buru. They speak the Buru language.

== Distribution ==
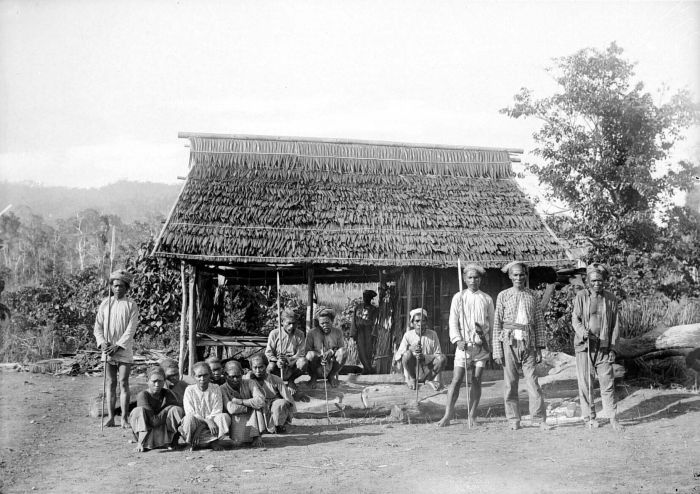
Traditional Buru house of the early 1900s.

About 33,000 of 35,000 Buru people live on the island of Buru; they make about a quarter of the island population (about 135,000 as of 2009) and are the most numerous native ethnicity of Buru; about 2,000 live on Ambon Island and several hundred are scattered over other islands in the Indonesian province of Maluku and the capital Jakarta. There is a small Buru community in the Netherlands formed by the descendants of the soldiers of Republic of South Moluccas (Indonesian: Republik Maluku Selatan) who moved there after the accession of this self-proclaimed state in Indonesia in 1950.

Buru people are evenly spread over Buru island, except for some parts of the northern coast and the central mountainous part which is sparsely populated. Their relative fraction is somewhat lower in the towns, such as Namrole and Namlea, owing to inflow of people of other Indonesian ethnicities. In the initial period of the Dutch colonization of the island in the middle of the 17th century, much of the tribal nobility of Buru was moved to the eastern part and later became one of the components in the ethnogenesis of ethnic Kayeli people. Several ethnic groups are distinguished within Buru people, which differ in lifestyle and language specifics – Rana (14,258 people mainly in the central part of the island), Masarete (about 9,500 people mainly in the south), Wae Sama (6,622 people mostly in the south-east), and Fogi (about 500 people in the west).

== Language ==
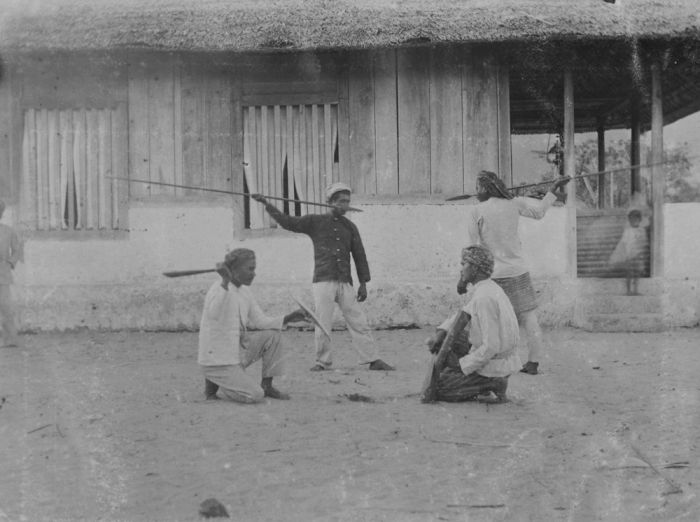
Buru people demonstrating spearing techniques.

The ethnic group speaks the Buru language, which belongs to the Central Maluku branch of the Malayo-Polynesian languages. Three dialects are distinguished according to the major ethnic groups of the Rana, Masarete, and Wae Sama. In addition, some 3,000–5,000 of the Rana people along with their main dialect use the so-called "secret dialect" Ligahan. The western dialect Fogi is now extinct. Lexical differences between the dialects are relatively small: about 90% between Masarete and Wae Sama, 88% between Masarete and Rana, and 80% between Wae Sama and Rana. Apart from native vernaculars, most Buru people, especially in the coastal regions and towns have command of the official language of the country, Indonesian. The coastal population also uses the Ambonese language, which is a creolized form of Malay with additions of the local lexicon.

== Religion ==
Religiously, Buru people are divided into comparable fractions of Sunni Muslims, who mostly live in the north of the island, and Christians-Protestants in the south. Remnants of traditional local beliefs persist almost everywhere, and in the central areas of the island many openly profess the cult of the supreme deity Opo Hebe Snulat and his messenger Nabiat. The economical crisis of the 1990s resulted in frequent conflicts among Buru people over religious grounds. So within a few days in December 1999, 43 people were killed and at least 150 houses burned in the Wainibe village.

== Lifestyle ==
Most Buru people are engaged in farming rice, millet, sago, sweet potato and various spice, such as allspice, nutmeg and Eucalyptus tree, which is used for aromatic oil. In the inland areas, they also hunt the wild pig Buru babirusa, deer and possum, and take part in tuna fishing on the coast. In the urban areas, the growing number of Buru people take jobs in the industrial enterprises. Traditional Buru houses are made from bamboo, often on stilts. The roofs are covered with palm leaves or reeds, with tiles becoming progressively popular. Traditional Buru clothing is similar that of many other Indonesia peoples. Men wear sarong (a kind of kilt) and a long-skirted tunic, and women are dressed in sarong and a shorter jacket. However, the colors and decor items differ quite substantially among Masarete, Wae Sama and Rana. Traditional Buru weapons are straight machete (parang) and a short spear. In the past, Buru hunters were famed for their spear throwing skills. Buru people, along with the Muslim or Christian names, also use traditional ones, the most common being Lesnussa, Latbual, Nurlatu, Lehalima, Wael and Sigmarlatu.
