= Lisela people =

Ethnic group of Indonesia

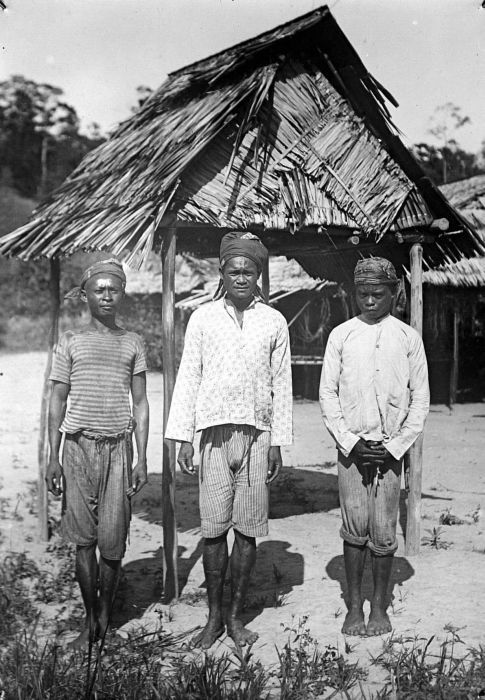
- Buru people in folk costume, early 1900s.

Total population
- 13,000

Regions with significant populations
- Indonesia (Buru): more than 11,000

Languages
- Lisela language, Indonesian language

Religion
- Islam (predominantly), Animism, Christianity

Related ethnic groups
- Buru • Kayeli • Rana

The Lisela people (Indonesian: Orang Lisela) is an ethnic group mostly living on the Indonesian island of Buru, as well as on some other Maluku Islands. They belong to the eastern Indonesian anthropological group and are sometimes referred to as northern Buru people. From an ethnographic point of view, Lisela are similar to other indigenous peoples of Buru island. They speak the Lisela language.

== Distribution ==
The total number of Lisela people is about 13,000, of which more than 11,000 live on Buru Island, other small communities living adjacent to Buru Island in Seram Island and Manipa Island, and as well as a few hundreds more on Ambon Island.

On Buru Island, the Lisela people live quite compactly in a narrow strip of lowland along the northern coast of the Kayeli Gulf. They constitute the ethnic majority in this region, despite their fraction in the total population in Buru Island is only about 8%. On Seram Island, they lived on the west coast, forming 3 isolated islands.

During the Dutch colonization in the first half of the 17th century, much of Lisela people had been relocated to the far eastern part of Buru Island for working at the Dutch plantations; then later in the process they became part of Kayeli people.

== Language ==
The native Lisela people speak the Lisela language, which belongs to the Central Maluku branch of the Malayo-Polynesian languages. Within its framework consists of 2 distinct dialects namely the Lisela dialect, which is spoken by most of the Lisela people and the Tagalisa dialect, which is mostly spoken among those living in the north eastern coast of Buru Island.

Most Lisela people speak their native Lisela language on a daily basis, although there are traces of its usage tends to head toward a decline; which is much noticeable compared to their closely related Buru people. This is due to active contact with the Lisela people living along the coastal areas with outsiders from other parts of Indonesia who settled in the Buru Island since the beginning of the 20th century. As a result the natives gradually shift to the usage of the official language of Indonesia, Indonesian or the Ambon dialect of Malay language (Ambonese Malay), a fairly common lingua franca among the Moluccans which is a simplified Indonesian language with additions of the local lexicon.

== Religion ==
The vast majority of Lisela people are Sunni Muslims. There is also a small Christian community that makes up about 5% of the people group who are mostly Protestants, but also Catholics and Evangelical Christians. The remaining 30% of the people group are also represented with some remnant of the traditional folk beliefs. At the same time, many Muslims themselves also retain significant remnants of these beliefs. This often leads to peculiar interpretations of the Islamic canons and sometimes result in the formation of unique syncretic cults and rituals. The blending of the Islamic-pagan ritual is most pronounced for example in marriage, when wedding begins with selling the bride by her parents' house, in accordance with the traditional ritual minta bini and culminates with the collective Muslim prayer.

== Economy ==
Most Lisela people are engaged in farming rice, maize, sago, sweet potato and various spice, such as allspice, nutmeg and Eucalyptus tree used for aromatic oil. In the inland areas, they also hunt the wild pig Buru babirusa, deer and possum, and take part in tuna fishing on the coast. In the urban areas, the growing number of Lisela people take jobs in the industrial enterprises. Traditional Buru houses are made from bamboo, often on stilts. The roofs are covered with palm leaves or reeds, with tiles becoming progressively popular. National Buru costume is similar that of most other Indonesia peoples. Men wear sarong (a kind of kilt) and a long-skirted tunic, and women are dressed in sarong and a shorter jacket.
