= Buru language =

Austronesian language spoken in Indonesia

Buru
- li fuk Buru
- Native to: Indonesia
- Region: Buru Island (Maluku)
- Ethnicity: Buru, Masarete, and Rana
- Native speakers: 45,000 (2009)
- Language family: Austronesian: Malayo-Polynesian; Central–Eastern; Central Maluku; Sula–Buru; Buru; Buru
- Writing system: Latin

Language codes
- ISO 639-3: mhs
- Glottolog: buru1303

Buru or Buruese (Buru: li fuk Buru) is a Malayo-Polynesian language of the Central Maluku branch. In 1991 it was spoken by approximately 45,000 Buru people who live on the Indonesian island of Buru (Indonesian: Pulau Buru). It is also preserved in the Buru communities on Ambon and some other Maluku Islands, as well as in the Indonesian capital Jakarta and in the Netherlands.

The most detailed study of Buru language was conducted in the 1980s by Australian missionaries and ethnographers Charles E. Grimes and Barbara Dix Grimes.

== Dialects ==
Three dialects of Buru can be distinguished, each of which is used by its corresponding ethnic group on Buru island: Rana (named after the lake in the center of Buru; more than 14,000 speakers), Masarete (more than 9,500 speakers), and Wae Sama (more than 6,500 speakers). Some 3,000–5,000 of the Rana people along with their main dialect use the so-called "secret dialect" Ligahan. The dialect of Fogi which once existed in the western area of the island is now extinct. Lexical similarities between the dialects are about 90% between Masarete and Wae Sama, 88% between Masarete and Rana and 80% between Wae Sama and Rana. Aside from native vernaculars, most Buru people, especially in the coastal regions and towns, have at least some command and understanding of the official language of the country, Indonesian. The coastal population also uses Ambonese Malay.

== Naming and taboo ==
Buru people use traditional names, along with Muslim or Christian names, the most common being Lesnussa, Latbual, Nurlatu, Lehalima, Wael and Sigmarlatu. The language has several sets of taboo words, which are both behavioral and linguistic. For example, relatives refer to each other by kin names, but not by proper names (i.e., father, but not Lesnussa). However, contrary to many other Austronesian cultures, Buru people do refer to the deceased relatives by name. Other restrictions apply to the objects of nature, harvest, hunting and fishing, for which certain words should be chosen depending on the island area. These taboos have explanations in associated myths of legends. In all cases, the words for taboo items are not omitted, but substituted by alternatives. All Buru dialects have loanwords. Many of them originated from Dutch and Portuguese during the Dutch colonization and referred to the objects not previously seen on the island. Other types of borrowed words came from Malayan languages as a result of inflow of people from the nearby island.

== Phonology ==
The Buru language has 5 vowels and 17 consonants. They are illustrated on the tables below:

Consonants
		Labial	Apical	Laminal	Dorsal
Nasal		m	n		ŋ
Stop	voiceless	p	t̪	tʃ	k
Stop	voiced	b	d	(dʒ)	g
Fricative		f	s		h
Trill			r		
Approximant		w	l	j	

Vowels
	Front	Central	Back
Close	i		u
Mid	e		o
Open		a	

== Writing system ==
Contrary to other indigenous languages of Buru and the nearby island of Ambelau (Lisela, Kayeli and Ambelau), Buru has a functional writing system based on the Latin alphabet. Buru Christians worship with a Bible written in their native language, the first translations of which were made in 1904 by Dutch missionaries.

== Grammar ==
The Buru language can be classified as a subject–verb–object language, prepositional, with modifiers following the head noun in a noun phrase, and the genitive occurring before the noun.

=== Negation ===
In Buru, a speaker's perspective or evaluation of one or several utterances often appears at the end. Even whole stories may be concluded with a sentence or two expressing the speaker's attitude to what was just said, where or who they heard it from, or similar judgements. This is reflected at both the sentence and even clause level by means of auxiliaries, parts of the TAM (Tense-aspect-mood) system, tags, and other such modifiers. Grimes classifies these items as "external to the clause proper". This comes to include speaker evaluation of the truth value of what is said, marked by moo, the main negative adverbial in Buru.

All page references refer to Grimes (1991).

[Sira hapu lafa-t la yako langina] moo.
3.PL.A tie food-NOM for 1.SG earlier NEG
'They didn't tie up trailfood for me earlier.'

Such clause-final negation is atypical of Austronesian languages, in which the negative almost exclusively appears before the verb or predicate. This feature appears to have crossed the linguistic boundary between neighbouring Papuan languages and Buru, as well as other languages of the Moluccas. This is substantiated by the fact that "historical records indicate long-term and extensive interactions between Austronesians and Non-Austronesians in Halmahera and the Moluccas". Consequently, Klamer concludes that it is "reasonable to analyze ... final negation in ... Buru ... as having a [non-Austronesian (i.e. Papuan)] origin for which there is substantial historical and linguistic evidence".

By combining with moo, other negative adverbials have been derived throughout the language's history, giving rise to mohede ('not yet') and tehuk moo ('no longer'). Mohede is a frozen compound of the words moo and hede, where hede is an adverbial with a continuative aspect (translated as 'still', i.e. mohede = 'still not', cf. German noch nicht or Italian ancora no(n)). Unlike other negative adverbials and auxiliaries, the segment tehuk may appear in both the "nucleus" (directly following the verb) or clause-final, as well as (rather uniquely) in both positions at once.

Da kaa mohede.
3.SG eat {not yet}
'He hasn't eaten yet.'

Da kaa gehu-t tehuk moo
3.SG eat taro-NOM longer NEG
'She doesn't eat taro anymore.'

Da kaa tehuk gehu-t tehuk moo.
3.SG eat longer taro-NOM longer NEG
'She doesn't eat taro anymore.'

The deictic element sa can be combined with moo (or any of the other aforementioned negative elements) to mean 'nothing, no(ne), nobody'. Sa is related to the quantifier sia ('some'), and, as such, constructions involving sa … moo may be glossed as 'not one'. Where exactly a speaker places this element sa indicates the intended scope of the negation, whilst the negative, as is mandatory for Buru, remains clause final. The negative polarity items anyone and anything are represented consistently in Buru as ii sa ('one thing') and geba sa ('one person') respectively.

Lea tau-n dii, da dufa sa moo, da oli hama saa.
sun full-GEN DIST 3.SG get one NEG, 3.SG return search one
'All that day, if he gets nothing, he goes home hunting for something.'

Geba sa kaa ii sa mohede.
person one eat thing one {not yet}
'Nobody has eaten anything yet.'

Geba sa kaa ii sa tehuk moo.
person one eat thing one longer NEG
'Nobody is eating anything anymore.'

Moo may also be employed to add stronger emphasis to prohibitive clauses that are introduced by the prohibitive marker bara ('don't').

Bara iko ego pala moo!
don't go get rice NEG
'Do not, by any means, go get rice!'

If moo directly follows a verb, then the cliticised object marker -h, if present, will attach to it to form of mohe.

Ya te puna mo.he.
1.SG CAP do NEG.it
'I don't know how to make it.'
'I can't do it.'

=== Pronouns and person markers ===
Free pronouns may be used equally for the subject and object of intransitive verbs (marking either actor or undergoer).

Free pronouns
Person	Number		
Person	Singular	Plural	Dual
1INC		kita	
1EXCL	yako	kami	
2	kae	kimi	
3	rine/ringe	sira	sino

Examples:

Yako paha ringe
1SG hit 3SG
'I hit him.'

Ringe paha yako
1SG hit 1SG
'He hit me.'

Yako iko
1SG go
'I go.'

Sira oli
3PL return
'They come back.'

Yako glada
1SG hunger
'I am hungry.'

Ringe mata
3SG die
'He died.'

Pronominal proclitics
Person	Number	
Person	Singular	Plural
1INC		kam
1EXCL	yak/ya	kit
2	ku	kim
3	da	du

Examples:

Ya paha ringe
1SG hit 3SG
'I hit him.'

da paha yako
3SG hit 1SG
'He hit me.'

ya iko
1SG go
'I go.'

Du oli
3PL return
'They come back.'

Ya glada
1SG hunger
'I am hungry.'

Da mata
3SG die
'He died.'

=== Possession ===
Depending on its distribution a possessive word can behave verbally or nominally, or as the head of a predicative possessive construction or as the modifier of the possessive NP. The possessive word is the only word in the Buru language obligatorily inflected for person and number and behaves much like a verb in its affixing possibilities. All examples in this section have been taken from Grimes, 1991 chapter 14.

The basic structure of the constituent is SVO.

Yako nango huma saa.
1SG 1SG.POSS house one
'I have/own a house.' (p. 279)

Functional and distributional behaviour of the possessive construction:
Applicative /-k/ is used to indicate a definite pronominal object (an object that functions as a pronoun).

Todo naa, ya nangu-k.
machete PROX 1SG 1SG.POSS-k
'This machete, it is mine.' (p. 280)

San nake-k?
who 3SG.POSS-k
'Whose is it?.' (p. 280)

The possessive word can also accept valence changing verbal prefixes; however, this is restricted to the third singular form nake.

Petu kami rua hai em-nake-k eta dena na Rana.
SEQ 1PL.EX two follow STAT-3SG.POSS-k until arrive PROX lake
'So the two of us followed as his companion-assistants until arriving here at Rana.' (p. 280)

Geba-ro kadu-k pa du wana em-nake-k eta lea.
person-PL come-k REAL 3PL awake STAT-3SG.POSS-k until sun
'People came and they stayed away at his disposal keeping him company until dawn.' (p. 280)

People can be put at someone's disposal through the combination of /ep-em-/.

Kawasan p-em-nake-k geba rua ute ringe eta dena la masi.
head CAUS-STAT-3SG.POSS-k person two DAT 3SG until arrive downstream sea
'The village head put two people at his disposal until they should reach the coast.' (p. 280/1)

The possessive word, with or without a proceeding cliticised free pronoun, functions as a possessive pronoun with a NP.

Da kala-k ya nang ama.
3SG call-k [1SG 1SG.POSS father]NP
'He summoned my father.' (p. 281)

Da lata-h tu ya nang todo.
3SG cut-it [with 1SG 1SG.POSS machete]
'He cut it with my machete.' (p. 281)

Used with verbs of exchange, the possessive word can have the force of a dative argument.

Ego nang pawe saa.
Get 1SG.POSS mango one
'Get me a mango/get a mango for me.' (p. 281)

== Morphology ==
=== Demonstratives ===
The World Atlas of Language Structures (WALS) classifies demonstratives based on two criteria: the demonstrative has a meaning that contrasts with some other form in terms of physical proximity to the speaker, so that there is at least a two-way contrast of proximal (near speaker) versus distal (not near speaker); or that the form can be used as an indication that the hearer is intended to direct their attention towards something in the physical environment.

Buru follows an order of noun-demonstrative in noun phrases (NP). This appears to be typical of languages in the Centro-Malayo Polynesian (CMP) language family. Paulohi, Tetun and Nuaulu are just some of the CMP languages that follow this pattern, and there do not appear to be any exceptions to this rule.

==== Demonstrative tags ====
Demonstrative tags dita – 'that particular way, like that, in that way' – and nata 'this particular one, like this, in this way' – are formed by combining the general definite deictics dii and naa with /-ta/.^{:173.}

Da tewa soal na.ta.
3SG know problem PROX.DEM
'He knows this particular problem.'

Ingat tu ana-fina di.ta, la ku kaweng tu-ha.
Remember with child-female, DIST.DEM IRR 2SG marry[Arab] with-3SG
'Pay attention to that particular girl, so you can marry her.'

As a sentence tag, these demonstratives imply a summarising of previous information.

Kae geb.akal na.ta.
2SG person.idea[Arab] PROX.DEM
'You are a deceitful person, [behaving] in this way.'

=== Spatial and temporal deixis ===
Deictics narrow the scope of definiteness and referentiality, with general deictics marking both time and space. Buru uses a relative system of deictics, where it is concerned with the spatial or temporal orientation of the speaker, rather than an absolute system whereby it would anchor to fixed points in space or time. For example, lawe 'downstream' can signal different orientations depending on which village the speaker is in, as well as the scope of the land in question- narrow scope: village and associated fields, or broad scope: inter-village territories.^{:167.}

==== Overview ====
A noun that has not been modified by a deictic is ambiguous as to whether it is generic or indefinite.

Da puna katin.
3S make mat
'She makes mats/She's making a mat.'

Saa is indefinite and is ambiguous as to whether the referent is non-specific or specific. Indefinite saa contrasts with definite naa 'proximal' and dii 'distant'. Saa is used to introduce referents that are cataphorically important.

Da puna {katin saa}.
3S make mat-general
'She's making a mat.'

Da puna {katin naa}.
3S make mat-definite
'She's making this mat/ She's making a mat now.'

General or indefinite deictics signal time whenever they follow a specific or definite deictic. dii indicates past time unless specifically marked otherwise.

Da puna {huma dae dii}.
3S make house-definite-past.
'He made that (upstream) house then.'

Focus may be placed on naa and dii when combined with ang – 'immediate'.

Da puna huma ang.naa.
3S make house immediate-definite.
'He's making this very house / He's making this house right now.'

Buru uses a system of double deictics to emphasise definite arguments by using a specific deictic followed by a general deictic.

Ringe iko pa wae pao dii.
3S go down water down DIST
'He went down to that water down there.'

==== Topographical deictics ====
Topographical deictics are all definite. Deictics saka and pao are typically oriented to the topographical notions of 'up' and 'down' (respectively) the sides of a valley perpendicular to a stream or river. However, they may be extended to culturally anchored notions such as 'up/down the coast'.^{:170.}

The notion of dae 'toward an emic centre' and la(we) 'away from an emic centre' are the deictics used when referring to distance. Headwaters (olo-n) and sources (lahi-n) are of extreme cultural significance on the island of Buru. This is also the case in Proto-Austronesian. Proto-Austronesian had deictics for land-sea, upstream/uphill and inland, as well as downstream/downhill and seaward, which were synonym pairs.

When one is returning to Buru one is going dae, overlooking the local topography of where they are standing when talking about returning to Buru. When one is traveling away from the island, for example to Jakarta, one is going lawe. The meaning and use of lawe has thus expanded to an extended sense of 'far'.

Da puna {huma dae}.
3S make house-upstream.
'He's making that (upstream) house.'

Da puna {huma lawe}.
3S make house-downstream.
'He's making that (downstream) house.'

Inside a house is referred to with the non-finalised cliticised deictics as da lale 'inside' or da huma lale-n 'inside the house', in contrast to la kako 'outside (the house)', unless the local drainage patterns are of particular relevance, overriding the local topography. The preposition la 'to, for' has also developed from the notion of 'away from an emic centre', signalling energy being directed away from the Actor as the source of the action or effort toward a goal.

==== Deixis in noun phrases ====
===== Modifying a noun phrase =====
Deictics in noun phrases (NP) are always final and thus never cliticised as topic or in post-verbal arguments. In this environment, definite deictics indicate that the referent is anaphorically understood or uncontroversially known. When following a NP, deictics may specify spatial or temporal orientation.^{:171.}

Geba dii, da iko haik.
[person DIST]_{TopicNP} 3s go PFV.
'That man, he's already gone.'

===== Substituting for a noun phrase =====
Noun phrases on post-verbal arguments whose referent is can be understood anaphorically can be substituted by a deictic. In cases where deictics behave as pro-forms for noun phrases, they cannot be modified for number or attribute.^{:171.}

Da peka fafu isi-n bono dii.
3S {throw out} [pig content-GEN rotten DIST]_{O}
'He threw out that rotten pig meat.'

Da peka dii.
3S {throw out} [DIST]_{O.}
'He threw that out.'

===== Deictics as prepositions =====
Functioning as a preposition, the deictic relates the object of the preposition in space or time. Where information is not anaphorically retrievable, the cliticised form of a deictic may function as a non-restrictive modifier when placed before the head noun. A preceding cliticised deictic functions as a locative preposition. The object of the preposition may also be considered a deictic NP to signal that it is anaphorically retrievable.

Da kadu-k na huma naa.
3S come-k PROX house PROX
'He came here to this house.' [preposition and deictic NP]

The directional sense of deictics used as prepositions may be differentiated by the use of the allative gam 'go/toward' or non-allative fi 'at, from' complex prepositions. These prepositions are dependent and therefore are obligatorily followed by a deictic.^{:172.}

Da kadu-k gam na huma.
3S come-k [ALL PROX house]_{PP}
'He came to/toward this house.'

====== Fi ======
Fi is thought to have been derived from the archaic verbs fili(m) 'be from' and fiki(ng) 'be at' ^{259}.For fi to not be followed by a deictic in some form would be ungrammatical. The use of fi as a preposition indicates location 'at' when used with a verb that does not involve motion.

====== Gam ======
The use of the allative gam(a) is used as a locative rather than dative. If used where one would expect a dative, it serves to highlight the direction of the exchange. Like fi, it would be ungrammatical for gam to not be followed by a deictic.

Ya tuke-h la ringe.
1S give-it DAT 3S
'I gave it to her.'

====== Deictic la as a preposition ======
The notion of la(we) as 'downstream' is secondary to the notion of la(we) as 'energy directed away from an emic center'. La has also developed into dative 'to, toward' and benefactive 'for', indicating energy being directed away from the Actor.^{:257.}

Ya tuke matan la ringe.
1S give money DAT 3S
'I gave money to him.'

==== Deictics as object of preposition ====
Deictics may substitute for the object or complement of a preposition, just as they may do for core argument NPs. When used in this way, it is assumed that the identity of the referent is anaphorically retrievable or uncontroversially known.^{:173.}

Da defo fi saka.
3S stay [LOC up]_{PP}
'He lives up there.'
