= Buru–Sula languages =

Subgroup of the Austronesian language family

Buru–Sula
- Geographic distribution: Indonesia
- Linguistic classification: Austronesian: Malayo-Polynesian; Central–Eastern; Central Maluku; Buru–Sula
- Subdivisions: Buru; Sula

Language codes
- Glottolog: sula1247

The Buru–Sula languages are a group of Austronesian languages (geographically Central–Eastern Malayo-Polynesian languages) spoken on the Buru and Sula Islands in the eastern Moluccas. They are known for their unique numbering system. Buru itself has almost forty thousand speakers, and Sula about twenty thousand.

== Classification ==
The languages are:

- Buru: Ambelau, Buru, Lisela, Moksela (extinct), Hukumina (extinct), Palumata (extinct)
- Sula: Mangole, Sula, Taliabo
