= Ambelau people =

Ethnic group from Maluku, Indonesia

Total population
- 8,260

Regions with significant populations
- Indonesia (Ambelau and Buru)

Languages
- Ambelau, Ambonese Malay, and Indonesian

Religion
- Sunni Islam

Related ethnic groups
- Masarete • Kayeli • Buru

The Ambelau people (Indonesian: Orang Ambelau) are an ethnic group who form the majority of the population of the Indonesian island of Ambelau. They also live on nearby island Buru and other islands. By ethnography, the Ambelau are close to most indigenous peoples of Buru island. They number about 8,260, and speak the Ambelau language.

== Settlement and distribution ==
Ambelau people form a majority on the island of Ambelau and each of its settlements and they inhabit the coastal areas of the island. The largest Ambelau community outside Ambalau island is the village of Wae Tawa (700 people) south-east of Buru. Its members maintain their ethnic identity and keep cultural, social and economic ties with Ambalau island. Ambelau minorities also live in other parts of Buru, on Ambon and other Maluku Islands and in Jakarta. During the Dutch colonization in the first half of the 17th century, most Ambelau people were forced to move to Buru to work on the Dutch spice plantations.

== Language ==
The ethnic group speaks the Ambelau language, which belongs to the Central Maluku branch of the Malayo-Polynesian languages. Most of Ambelau people also speak Indonesian or Ambonese Malay (Melayu Ambon), which is a creolized form of Malay.

== Religion ==
The majority of Ambelau people are Sunni Muslims. Islam has become deeply rooted in their culture and daily lives.

== Livelihood ==
Most Ambelau people are engaged in farming. The mountainous terrain of Ambalau island hinders cultivation of rice, which is the major crop of the region, and therefore maize, sago, sweet potato, cocoa, coco, allspice and nutmeg are grown instead in the coastal areas. Some residents of Ambalau work at the sago plantation on Buru. Hunting the wild pig Buru babirusa is common, but tuna fishing is mostly localized to the villages of Massawa and Ulima.

== Culture ==
=== Traditional house ===
Traditional Buru houses are made from bamboo, often on stilts. The roofs are covered with palm leaves or reeds, with tiles becoming progressively popular.

=== Traditional clothing ===
Traditional Buru clothing is similar that of most other Indonesia peoples. Men wear sarong (a kind of kilt) and a long-skirted tunic, and women are dressed in sarong and a shorter jacket. The specificity of Ambelau clothing is the preference of red color in holiday attire, which also includes hats of peculiar shape – a peaked cap with a plume for men and dressing with panache for women.
