= Lisela language =

Austronesian language spoken in Indonesia

Lisela
- Li Enyorot
- Native to: Indonesia, Maluku
- Region: Buru Island
- Native speakers: (12,000 cited 1989)
- Language family: Austronesian: Malayo-Polynesian; Central–Eastern; Central Maluku; Sula–Buru; Buru; Lisela
- Writing system: none

Language codes
- ISO 639-3: lcl
- Glottolog: lise1239
- ELP: Lisela

Lisela (Indonesian: bahasa Lisela), also called Li Enyorot, is an Austronesian language; in 1989 it was spoken by about 11,900 Lisela people mostly living in the northern part of Indonesian island Buru (Indonesian: Pulau Buru). It is also preserved among the small Lisela community on the Ambon Island.

The language belongs to the Sula–Buru group of Central Maluku branch of Malayo-Polynesian languages. It has two dialects, major Lisela and minor Tagalisa, the latter is used by the inhabitants of the north-east coast of Buru. The language is dying as most Lisela people switch either to the national language of Indonesia, Indonesian, or to the Ambonese variety of the Malay language (Melayu Ambon). The latter is widely used in the Maluku Islands as a lingua franca and is a local form of Malay with additions of the local lexicon.

The language most closely related to Lisela is Buru, especially its dialect Masarete – their lexical similarity is 68%. Thus many sources regard Lisela as a dialect, though the most diverging, of Buru. Lisela had also borrowed much from the Sula language, as a result of the interaction between the Lisela and Sula people living together as the northern Buru coast. The language has no writing system. The most detailed study of Lisela language was conducted in the 1980s by Charles E. Grimes and Barbara Dix Grimes – Australian missionaries and ethnographers, active members of SIL International (they should not be confused with Joseph E. Grimes and Barbara F. Grimes, Charles' parents, also known Australian ethnographers).
