= Kayeli language =

Extinct Austronesian language of Indonesia

Kayeli
- Kajeli
- Native to: Indonesia, Maluku
- Region: Buru Island
- Ethnicity: Kayeli
- Extinct: 1989
- Language family: Austronesian: Malayo-Polynesian (MP); Central–Eastern MP; East Central Maluku; Seram; Nunusaku; Kayeli
- Dialects: Leliali; Lumaete

Language codes
- ISO 639-3: kzl
- Glottolog: kaye1241
- ELP: Kayeli

Kayeli is an extinct Austronesian language once used by the Kayeli people of the Indonesian island Buru. Two dialects were recognized, namely Leliali (Liliali) and Lumaete (Lumaiti, Mumaite, Lumara).

== History ==
Whereas about 800 Kayeli people still live in the southern coast of the Kayeli Bay, in the eastern part of Buru, as of 1995, only 3 elderly people could speak the language and have not used it for three decades; other natives changed to Ambonese Malay. The latter is widely used in the Maluku Islands as a second language and is a Malay creole with additions of the local lexicon.

A 1983 literature review indicated about 1,000 speakers of Kayeli; however, a field survey conducted in 1989 on Buru island located only four speakers, two men and two women, all in their sixties. They have not used the language for over 30 years and had difficulties in summarizing the basic lexicon. The last speaker of the Leliali dialect died in 1989 and no speakers of Lumaete could be located by then. A little more than 400 basic Kayeli words could be assembled, of which 13% were loanwords from Malay, Arabic, Portuguese and Sanskrit. They revealed significant phonetic and lexical difference with the Buru language – the lexical similarity of Leliali dialect with the closest Buru dialect of Masarete was 45%.

The most detailed study of Kayeli language was conducted in the 1980s by Charles E. Grimes and Barbara Dix Grimes – Australian missionaries and ethnographers, active members of SIL International (they should not be confused with Joseph E. Grimes and Barbara F. Grimes, Charles' parents, also known Australian ethnographers). They use Kayeli language as an example in the analysis of the causes of recent extinction of some Malayo-Polynesian languages.
