= Mount Kapalatmada =

Mountain in Indonesia

- Location within Indonesia

Highest point
- Elevation: 2,700 m (8,900 ft)
- Prominence: 2,700 m (8,900 ft)
- Listing: Ultra; Ribu
- Coordinates: 3°18′00″S 126°13′12″E

Geography
- Location: Buru, Maluku Province, Indonesia

Mount Kapalatmada is a mountain in the Maluku Islands, Indonesia. At an elevation of 2,700 metres (8,858 ft) above sea level, it is the highest point on the Indonesian island of Buru.

== See also ==
- List of ultras of the Malay Archipelago
- List of islands by highest point
