= Kayeli people =

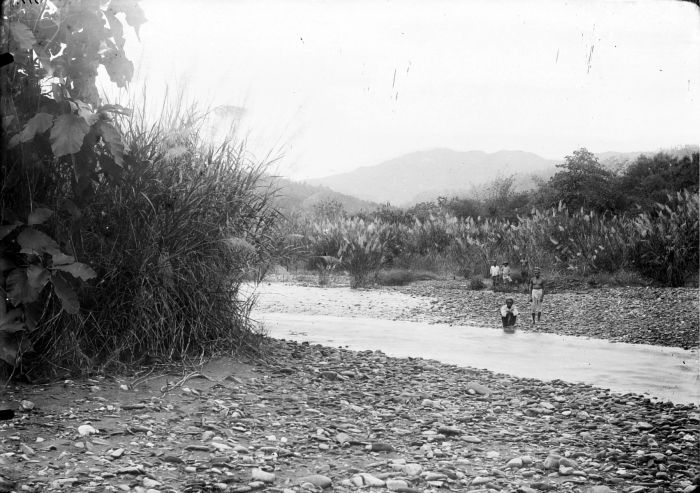
- Kayeli men at the Lumaiti riverbank in Buru, 1892.

Total population
- 600

Regions with significant populations
- Indonesia (Buru)

Languages
- Kayeli (extinct), Ambonese Malay, and Indonesian

Religion
- Islam (predominantly), Christianity, and Paganism

Related ethnic groups
- Buru • Rana • Lisela

The Kayeli people (Indonesian: Orang Kayeli) is an ethnic group mainly living on the southern coast of the Kayeli Gulf of Indonesian island Buru. From an ethnographic point of view, Kayeli are close to other indigenous people of Buru, such as the Lisela, Rana, Masarete, and Buru.

The Kayeli people were formed during the Dutch colonization of the modern Indonesian territory and during the 17th to the 19th century, the Dutch occupied their strategic location in comparison to other inhabitants of Buru Island. From the middle of the 20th century, the ethnic group's population experienced rapid population decline and there were approximately 800 people left by the early 21st century. In regards to religion, majority of them are Sunni Muslims, with some remnants of pagan beliefs. The Kayeli lost their native language by the end of the 20th century as they began to adopt other indigenous Buru languages or the Indonesian language.

== History ==
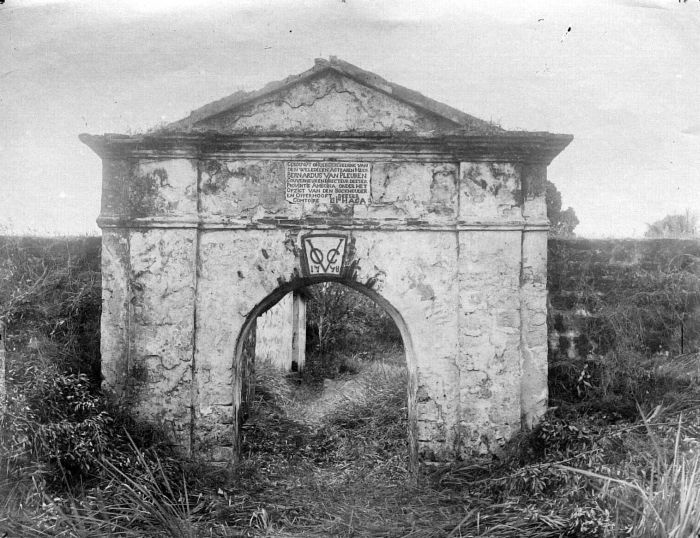
The remains of the Dutch fort near Kayeli Gulf.

Ethnogenesis of Kayeli is directly associated with the colonization of the Buru island by the Dutch East India Company in the 17th century. In 1658, the first permanent Dutch settlement and a military fort were built at the southern coast of Kayeli Gulf, and for two centuries it was the administrative center of the island. Accordingly, thousands of indigenous people were forcibly relocated to this area from other parts of the island, including much of the tribal nobility, and about thirteen large villages had been built around the fort. The relocation was designed to facilitate control over the local population and provide workforce for clove fields which were being planted by the Dutch in this part of the island.

As a result, 13 villages were built on a relatively small area around the fort. Representatives of various ethnic groups of the island were settled side by side and brought together by common economic activity, which eventually created the conditions that led to numerous mixed marriages. It is this way, by mixing peoples of different ethnic groups among themselves, as well as with a small native population of the eastern coast of Buru Island, wherein this part of the island there was the formation of a new ethnic community. Kayeli ethnicity with its own language was formed as a mixture of the newly arriving settlers and the native population of the fort area. Already by the end of the 18th century, a large proportion of the population of the locals identified themselves not by the ethnicity of their ancestors that they belonged to, but as a separate people group, of which their own name was adopted from the name of the gulf and the largest settlement that was founded on that very coast.

The presence among the ancestors of the tribal aristocracy and interaction with the Dutch colonial administration resulted in a special position of Kayeli over the next centuries, who claimed the role of indigenous elite of the island. However, upon gradual softening of the colonial system; due to the gradual decline in global prices for the cloves produced here, the Kayeli people began to lose their privileged status. By the end of the 19th century, a large part of the coastal population in Kaiely Gulf; which did not lose ethnic and cultural ties with relatives, started returning to their ancestral homes and as a consequence stopped the possibility of forming a larger community of Kayeli people.

So in 1880s, the leaders (rajas) of Liliali, Wae Sama, and Fogi moved back a significant part of their ethnic groups; they were joined in the early 1900s by Tagalisa. So the Muslim (indigenous) population of Kayeli fort decreased from 1,400 in the 1850s to 231 in 1907. The decay was accelerated by the departure of the Dutch in the 1950s and formation of independent Indonesia. The loss of support from the colonials added with the abandonment of the fort led to the acceleration of most of the Kayeli people to assimilate with other larger indigenous people of the island. Whereas a small Kayeli community still remains at Kayeli Gulf, their language is likely lost.

== Population and settlements ==
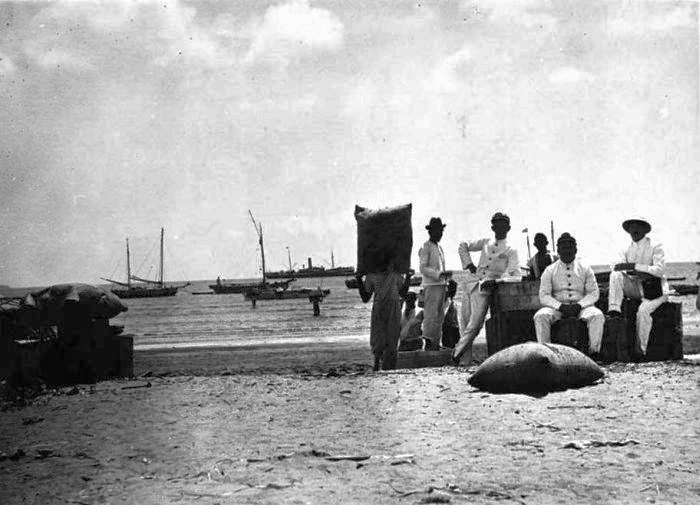
Kayeli men seen unloading of a KPM steamer on a beach near Kayeli, circa 1905 to 1914.

The total population of the Kayeli people in the early 21st century is about 600 people. There are some sources that claim 5,000 people but these apparently uses outdated data. In any case, the Kayeli people have the smallest population among the indigenous ethnic groups in Buru Island. They make up less than 0.5% of the island's present-day population (approximately 165,000 people in 2012). At the same time, given the rather rapid assimilation of the Kayeli people, the number of people who attribute themselves as part of the ethnicity continues to decline rapidly.

The Kayeli people are relatively concentrated in the northeastern part of Buru Island. Most of them are settled along the southern coast of Kayeli Gulf and the remaining small number of them in the valley of Apo River, which flows into the gulf.

== Religion ==
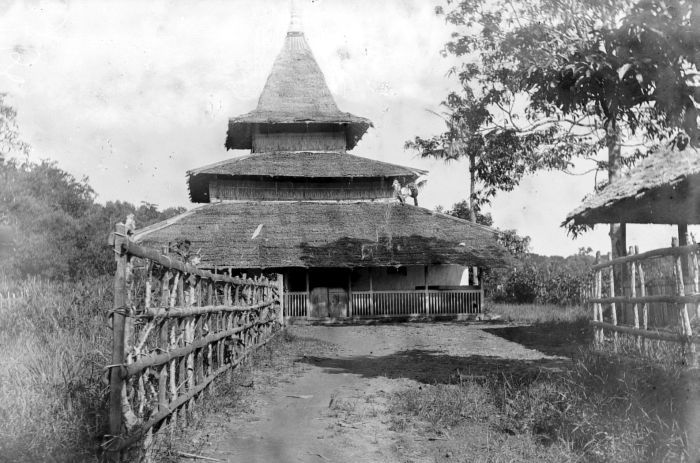
A traditional mosque in Kayeli, circa 1890 to 1940.

Like the very origin of the Kayeli people, the peculiarities of the religious affiliation of this people are directly related to the colonial activity of the Dutch. Since the arrival of the Dutch colonials on the island in the middle of the 17th century, the nobles and a large part of the ordinary inhabitants of Buru Island were converted to Sunni Islam, including the community that resettled in 1658 on the coasts of Kayeli Gulf were also Muslims. In an effort to ensure the loyalty of new settlers, the Dutch East India Company administrators signed a contract with the tribal leaders to guarantee their right to practice their Islamic religion. During the following centuries, the Dutch colonials were to some extent adhered to this commitment, despite active proselytizing preaching in Buru Island by the European Catholic and Protestant missionaries, it did not affect the region of Kayeli.

As a result, the Kayeli people are the most Islamized ethnic community of Buru Island. Among them there are remnants of pre-Islamic pagan belief systems, but to a much lesser extent than among other ethnic peoples of the island.

== Economic activity ==
In the first two centuries of the Dutch colonial rule, the absolute majority of the Kayeli people were exploited on carnation plantations. After the plant ceased to be the main agricultural crop of Buru Island, the economic activity of the Kayeli people began to diversify. Much of the people has gone into the cultivation of sago palm tree and Eucalyptus respectively for the production of sago and aromatic oil. Other significant development were acquired in fisheries.

== Notes ==
=== Bibliography ===
- Thomas Reuter, ed. (2006), Sharing the Earth, Dividing the Land: Land and territory in the Austronesian world (PDF), Australian National University, ISBN 1-920942-69-6
- Charles E. Grimes (January 1995), Digging for the Roots of Language Death in Eastern Indonesia: The Cases of Kayeli and Hukumina (PDF), Annual Meeting of the Linguistic Society of America
