= Buru =

Island in Maluku, Indonesia

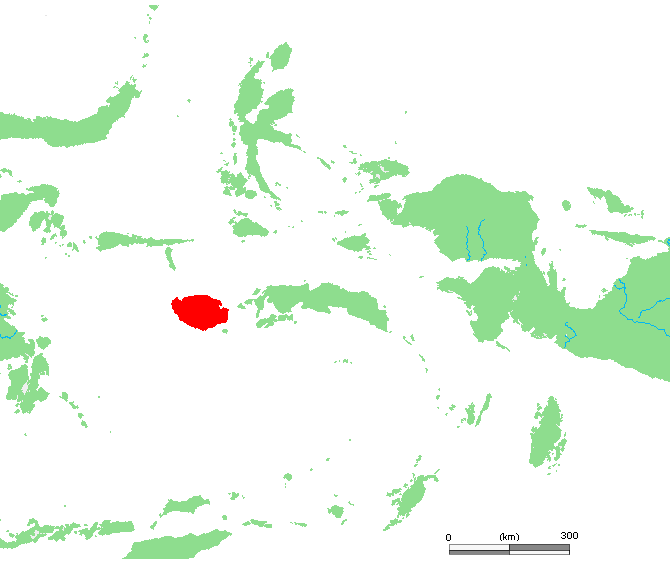

Geography
- Location: Oceania
- Coordinates: 03°25′30″S 126°40′03″E
- Archipelago: Maluku Islands
- Area: 9,505 km^{2} (3,670 sq mi)
- Highest elevation: 2,428 m (7966 ft)
- Highest point: Mount Kapalatmada

Administration
- Indonesia
- Province: Maluku
- Regencies: Buru and South Buru
- Largest settlement: Namlea (pop. 37,869)

Demographics
- Population: 215,277 (2020 Census)
- Pop. density: 17.0/km^{2} (44/sq mi)
- Ethnic groups: Buru, Lisela, Ambelau, Kayeli, Masarete, Rana, Wai Apu, and Wai Loa (native); Ambonese, Butonese, Javanese, Bugis, Sula, Tobelo, and others (migrant)

Additional information
- Time zone: IEST (UTC+09:00)

Buru (formerly spelled Boeroe, Boro, or Bouru) is the third largest island within the Maluku Islands of Indonesia. It lies between the Banda Sea to the south and Seram Sea to the north, west of Ambon and Seram islands. The island belongs to Maluku province and includes the Buru and South Buru regencies. Their administrative centers, Namlea and Namrole, respectively, have ports and are the largest towns of the island, served by Namlea Airport and Namrole Airport respectively.

About a third of the population is indigenous, mostly the Buru, but also the Lisela, Ambelau, Kayeli, Masarete, Rana, Wai Apu, and Wai Loa. The rest of population are immigrants from Java and nearby Maluku Islands. Religious affiliation is evenly split between Christianity and Sunni Islam, with some remnants of traditional beliefs. While local languages and dialects are spoken within individual communities, the national Indonesian language is used among the communities and by the administration. Most of the island is covered with forests rich in tropical flora and fauna. From the present 179 bird and 25 mammal species, about 14 are found either on Buru only or also on a few nearby islands, the most notable being the wild pig Buru babirusa. There is little industry on the island, and most population is engaged in growing rice, maize, sweet potato, beans, coconuts, cocoa, coffee, clove and nutmeg. Other significant activities are animal farming and fishing.

The island was first mentioned around 1365. Between 1658 and 1942, it was colonised by the Dutch East India Company and then by the Crown of the Netherlands. The Dutch administration relocated many local villages to the newly built island capital at Kayeli Bay for working at clove plantations. It also promoted the hierarchy among the indigenous people with selected loyal rajas placed above the heads of the local clans. The island was occupied by the Japanese forces between 1942 and 1945 and in 1950 became part of independent Indonesia. During former president Suharto's New Order administration in the 1960s–1970s, Buru was the site of a prison used to hold thousands of political prisoners. While held at Buru, writer Pramoedya Ananta Toer wrote most of his novels, including Buru Quartet.

== Geography and geology ==
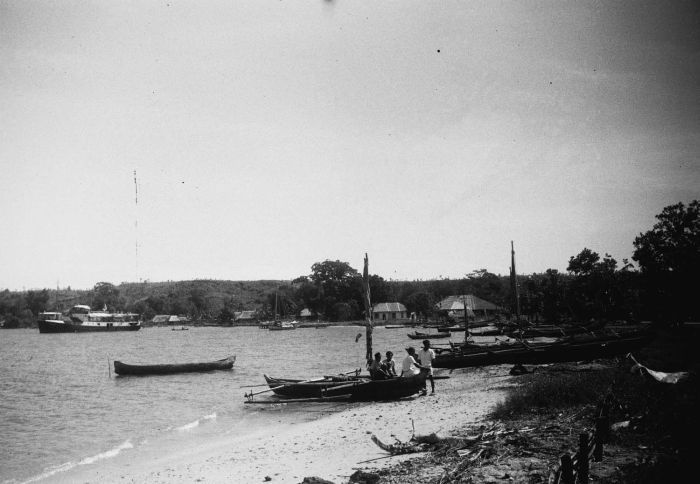
Kayeli bay near Namlea in July 1949

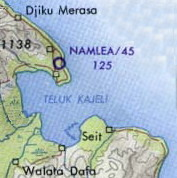
Kayeli Bay

Buru island lies between two seas of the Pacific Ocean – Seram Sea (Indonesian: Laut Seram) on the north and Banda Sea (Indonesian: Laut Banda) to the south and west. To the east, it is separated by the Manipa Strait (Indonesian: Selat Manipa) from Seram Island (Indonesian: Pulau Seram). With an area of 9,505 km^{2} (3,670 sq mi), Buru is the third largest among the Maluku Islands (Indonesian: Kepulauan Maluku) after Halmahera and Seram.

Buru is shaped like an oval, elongated from west to east. The maximum length is about 130 km (81 mi) from east to west and 90 km (56 mi) from north to south. The coastline is smooth, with the only major indentation being Kayeli Bay located on the eastern coast. The bay also has a smooth, oval shape. It extends into the island to 8–12 km and has a maximum width of 17 km; the width decreases to 9 km at the mouth; the coastal length of the bay is about 50 km. At the northern part of the mouth stands Namlea, the largest town of the island.

The highest point on the island (2,700 m (8,900 ft)) is the peak of Mount Kapalatmada (also called Kepala Madan, Kepalat Mada or Ghegan). Off the coast of Buru there are several smaller islands; those permanently inhabited are Ambalau (the largest, about 10 km in diameter, located about 20 km south-east of Buru) and Tengah (Indonesian: Pulau Tengah). The largest uninhabited islands are Fogi (Indonesian: Pulau Fogi), Oki (Indonesian: Pulau Oki) and Tomahu (Indonesian: Pulau Tomahu).

The island is mostly mountainous, especially in the central and western parts. Of the 9,505 km^{2} of the island area, 1,789 km^{2} lie 900 m above mean sea level, 872 km^{2} above 1,200 m and 382 km^{2} above 1,500 m. Flat areas are located in narrow strips near the coast and along the banks of river Apo. There they form a valley of the same name. Much of the island is covered with tropical rain forest.

The Apo River is the longest river of Buru. It flows nearly straight to the north-east and empties into Kayeli Bay; however, its bed is very winding for hundreds of meters, with loops all along its length. Two other permanent rivers are Geren and Nibe; the rest are intermittent rivers with discontinuous flow. The river discharge varies significantly through the year, reaching a maximum in the rainy season. Indonesian sources often include wae (meaning river) before the river names; thus Apo is often referred to as Waeapo or Wae Apo, or Apu in some local dialects. In the center of the island, at an altitude of 767 metres (2,516 ft), lies freshwater Lake Rana (Indonesian: Danau Rana). This is the only significant lake on Buru; it has a nearly rectangular shape with the length of about 4.3 km, width of about 2.7 km and an area of 11.5 km^{2} (4.4 sq mi)

The crust consists of several types of deposits. It is dominated by Cenozoic sedimentary rocks, probably originating from the Australian continent; Also present are younger volcanic rocks and more recent alluvial deposits. Sedimentary deposits in the form of silt, peat, sand and mud are mostly found in the river valleys. Metamorphic rocks of slate, schist and arkose dominate the northern part of the island. Very few mineral deposits of Buru have industrial value, and only limestone is mined commercially. However, significant reserves of oil and gas were discovered in the shelf in 2009. There are numerous coral reefs around the island. The soil mostly consists of yellow-red Podsol, Organosol, Grumosol and various mixtures.

== Climate ==
The climate is equatorial monsoonal, wet, and in general typical for the Maluku Islands. The rainy season extends from October to April with the highest rainfall in December–February. Despite the relatively small size of the island, its mountainous terrain results in several climatic zones. Apart from temperature reduction with altitude, the temperature variations across these zones are negligible, with the annual average of about 26 °C, However the annual precipitation differs and amounts to 1,400–1,800 mm in the north, 1,800–2,000 mm in the center, 2,000–2,500 mm in the south and 3,000–4,000 mm in the mountains, at elevation above 500 m.

== Flora and fauna ==
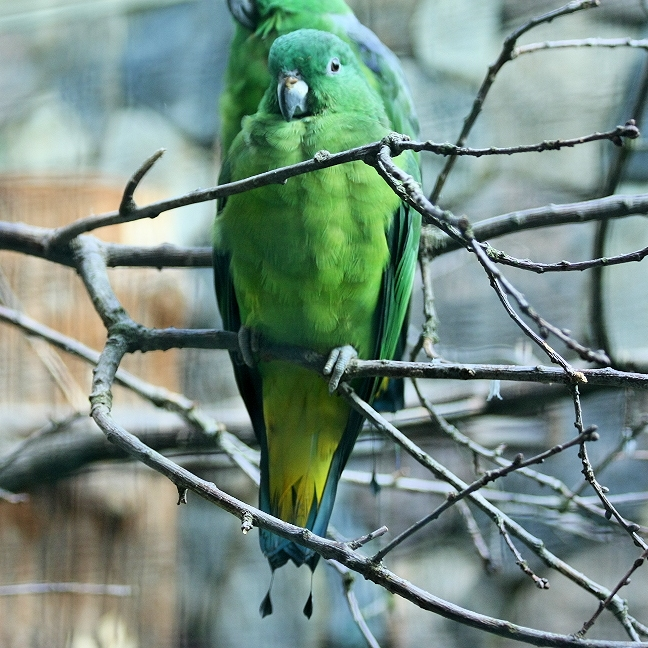
Buru racket-tail is endemic to the island

As Buru is located at the boundary between the biogeographic zones of Australia and Asia, its flora and fauna are unique and are the subject of national and international scientific research. Of 25 species of mammals found on the island, at least four are endemic to Buru and closest to it islands. The local species of the wild pig named Buru babirusa (Babyrousa babyrussa) is distinguished from the other Babyrousa species by having relatively long and thick body-hair. It also has very low fat content in their meat (only 1.27% compared to 5–15% for domestic pigs) and is regarded as a delicacy among the local population, which favours it to other wild pigs or deer in terms of texture and flavour. Also endemic to Buru are three types of bats: Moluccan flying fox (Pteropus chrysoproctus), Seram fruit bat Pteropus ocularis and lesser tube-nosed bat (Nyctimene minutus).

Of the 178 recorded species of birds, 10 are endemic to Buru and nearby islands: Buru racket-tail (Prioniturus mada), black-lored parrot (Tanygnathus gramineus), blue-fronted lorikeet (Charmosyna toxopei), Buru honeyeater (Lichmera deningeri), Buru cuckooshrike (Coracina fortis), Buru jungle flycatcher (Rhinomyias additus), madanga (Madanga ruficollis), Buru white-eye (Zosterops buruensis), tawny-backed fantail (Rhipidura superflua) and Buru monarch (Monarcha loricatus). Among those, the rufous-throated white-eye is regarded as endangered and the black-lored parrot and vulnerable (threatened) by the International Union for Conservation of Nature; both species were observed only in very limited areas of Buru island. There are another 19 birds that are near-endemic to Buru: rufous-necked sparrowhawk (Accipiter erythrauchen), dusky megapode (Megapodius forstenii), Moluccan megapode (Megapodius wallacei), white-eyed imperial pigeon (Ducula perspicillata), long-tailed mountain pigeon (Gymnophaps mada), red lory (Eos bornea), Moluccan hawk-owl (Ninox squamipila), Moluccan masked owl (Tyto sororcula), Wakolo myzomela (Myzomela wakoloensis), Buru friarbird (Philemon moluccensis), drab whistler (Pachycephala griseonota), white-naped monarch (Monarcha pileatus), dark-grey flycatcher (Myiagra galeata), black-eared oriole (Oriolus bouroensis), pale cicadabird (Coracina ceramensis), Buru thrush (Zoothera dumasi), cinnamon-chested flycatcher (Ficedula buruensis), Buru bush warbler (Locustella disturbans) and Buru flowerpecker (Dicaeum erythrothorax). Among butterflies, 25% of the Pieridae and 7% of the Papilionidae found on Buru are endemic to the island.

The vegetation is characteristic of tropical lowland evergreen and semi-evergreen rain forests, with the dominant family of Dipterocarpaceae, genera of Hopea, Shorea and Vatica, and the individual species of Anisoptera thurifera, Hopea gregaria, Hopea iriana, Hopea novoguineensis, Shorea assamica, Shorea montigena, Shorea selanica and Vatica rassak. Some of these trees may grow to more than 30 metres (98 ft) and are usually bound by thick lianas and other epiphytes. Open forest, woodland, and savanna areas also exist on Buru. The fire-resistant paper bark tree (Melaleuca cajuputi) is common in dry areas. The northwestern part of the island has steep limestone cliffs covered by mixed forests that include Shorea trees, and stunted Dacrydium novo-guineense is present at the mountain tops.

Primary forests constitute 60% of the island and are mostly found in the areas of Air Buaya and Waeapo. There is only 0.51% of secondary forests, in the district Batabual, and 0.9% of mangroves, at Waeapo, Air Buaya, Batabual and Namlea. A significant part of the island (23.10%) is taken by shrubs, and only 5.83% is open land, which is spread over most districts of Buru.

== Administrative division ==
The island belongs to the Indonesian province of Maluku (Indonesian: Propinsi Maluku). Until 1999, it was part of the Central Maluku Regency (Indonesian: Kabupaten Maluku Tengah) and then became a separate regency of the same name. In 2008, it was split into Buru Regency (Indonesian: Kabupaten Buru) and South Buru Regency (Indonesian: Kabupaten Buru Selatan).

Buru Regency has an area of 7,595.58 km^{2} and the administrative center at Namlea. It is divided into 10 districts: Namlea (center in Namlea), Waeapo (center – Waenetat), Waplau (center – Waplau), Batubual (center – Ilath), Teluk Kaiely (centre – Kaiely), Waelata (centre – Basakak), Lolong Guba (centre – Kubalahin), Lilialy (centre – Sawa), Air Buaya (center – Air Buaya) and Fena Leisela (center – Wamlana). The governor (Regent or Indonesian: bupati, as of October 2009) is Husni Hentihu and Vice Regent is Ramli Umasugi.

South Buru Regency (administrative center Namrole) has an area of 5,060 km^{2} and includes Ambelau island southeast of Buru (and other small islets). Its governing structure had not been completed as of February 2010, and the current acting Regent was then A. R. Uluputti. The regency is divided into 6 districts: Namrole (centre – Elfule), Kepala Madan (centre – Biloro), Leksula (centre – Leksula), Fena Fafan (centre – Waekatin), Waesama (centre – Wamsisi), and Ambalau (centre – Siwar); the last district is entirely located on the island of Ambalau.

== Population ==
As of the 2010 Census, the population of the islands administered as Buru was 161,828 people; at the 2020 Census this had risen to 210,648 with about 64.2% in the northern regency and 35.8% in the southern; the official population estimate at-mid 2022 was 215,277. The southern regency included the smaller island of Ambalau to the southeast of Buru. In the early 2020s, most of the population was concentrated in the coastal areas, and comprised the following major groups: indigenous Buru, Lisela, Ambelau, Kayeli, Masarete, Rana, Wai Apu, and Wai Loa; migrants from Java, and migrants from other Maluku Islands. The migration to Buru was stimulated by the Dutch colonial administration in the 1900s, and by Indonesian authorities in the 1950s–1990s. The local communities speak Buru, Lisela, and Ambelau in everyday life, however, the national Indonesian language is used as a means of international communication and is also used for writing. Also common is Ambonese Malay (Bahasa Melayu Ambon). The latter is widely used in the Maluku Islands as a second language and is a simplified form of Indonesian language with additions of the local lexicon. Some local dialects, such as the Hukumina, Palumata, and Kayeli, became extinct in the second half of the 20th century.

Religious composition of the population is heterogeneous: the number of islanders practising Sunni Islam (90%) and Christianity (10%) and the rest – mainly residents of remote mountain areas – still follow traditional local cults or do not have a clear religious affiliation. The economical crisis of the 1990s resulted in frequent conflicts among Buru people over religious grounds. In December 1999, 43 people were killed and at least 150 houses burned in the Wainibe village.

== History ==
=== Precolonial period ===
One of the first mentions of Buru occurred in the Nagarakretagama – an Old Javanese eulogy to Hayam Wuruk, the ruler of the Majapahit Kingdom, dating back to 1365. The island appears in the third line of 15th song in the list of lands subordinate to Majapahit under the name Hutan Kadali.

In the 16th–17th centuries Buru was claimed by the rulers of Ternate island and by the Portuguese; both claims were, however, symbolic, as neither party controlled the island, but only visited it on trade matters. More active were Makassar people from Sulawesi island, who had built fortifications on Buru and forced the natives to grow valuable spices, such as clove.

=== Colonial period ===
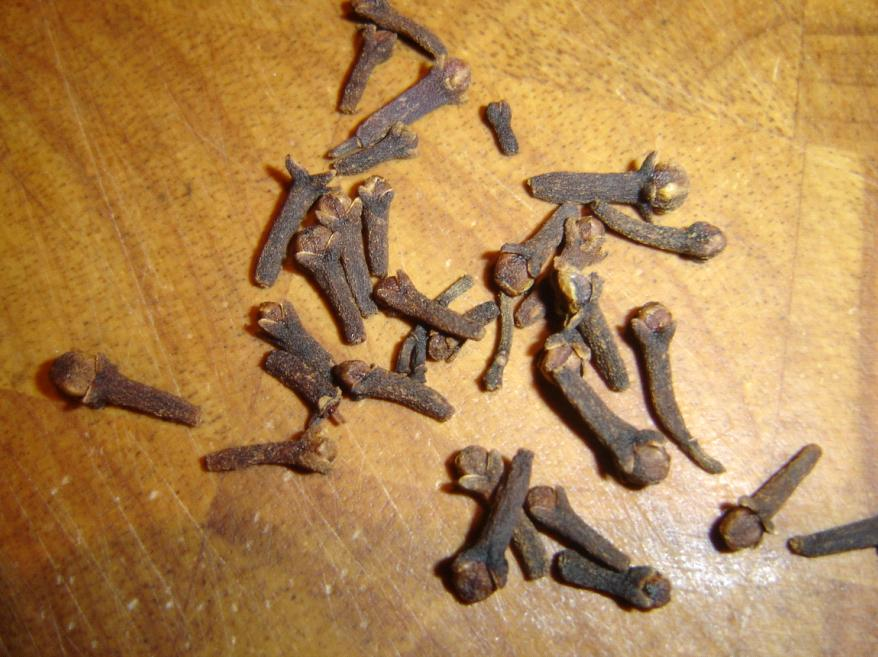
Clove – a spice, which played a significant role in the history of Buru

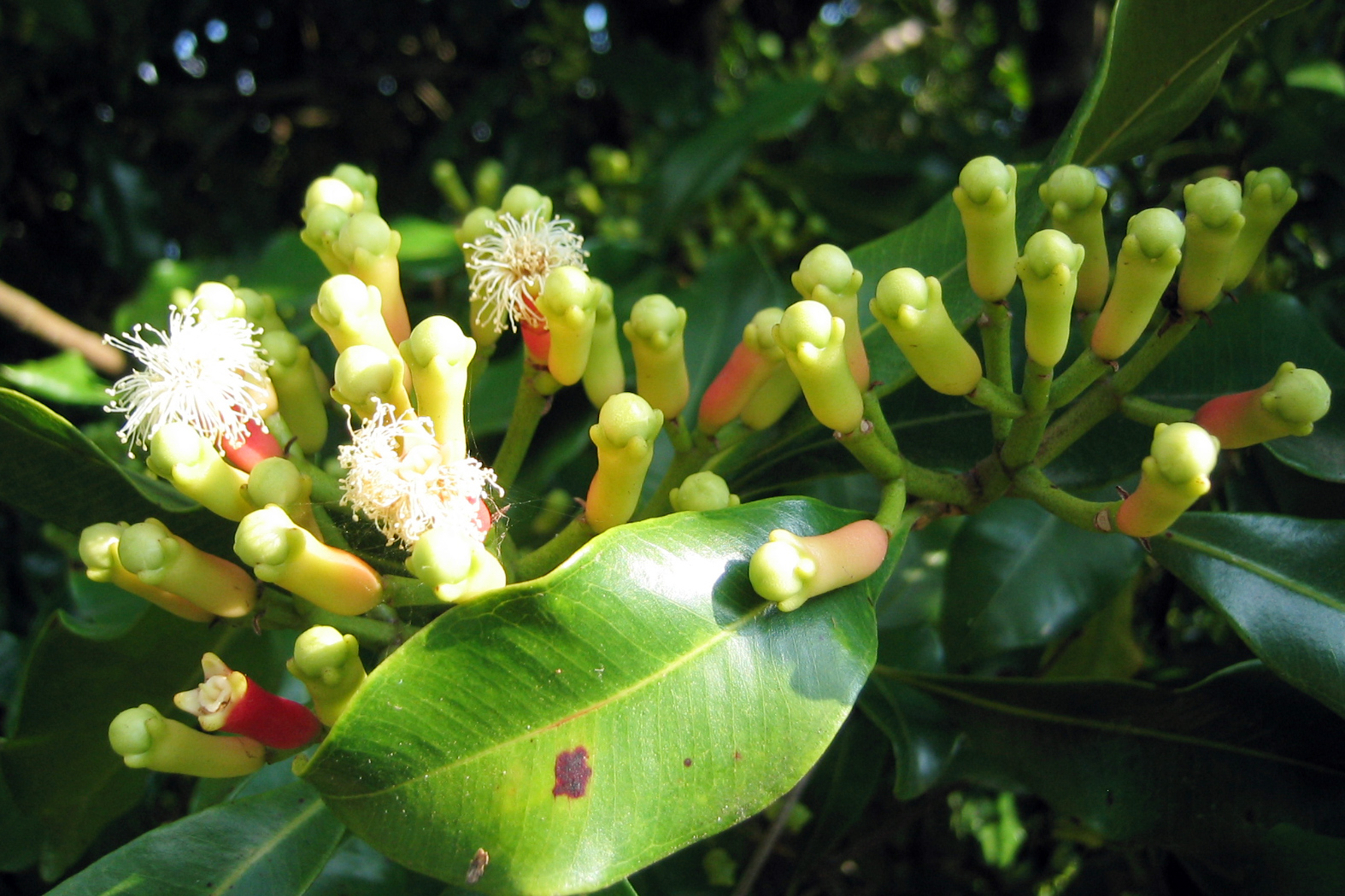
Clove tree

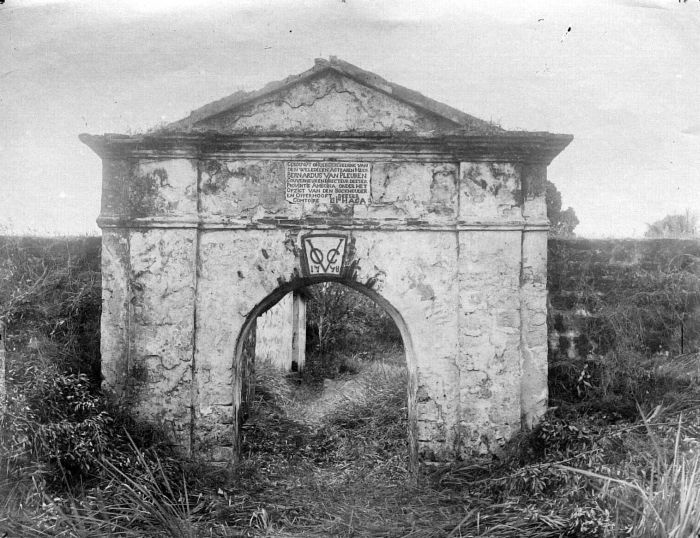
Remains of the Dutch fortress at Kayeli Bay.

The rivalry between the Makassar and Dutch East India Company for control over production and trade in spices in the east of the Malay archipelago resulted in military conflict. In 1648, a Dutch expedition to Buru expelled the Makassar from the island and destroyed their buildings and boats; instead of re-using the existing clove plantations, the Dutch burned more than three thousand trees, as they were not in position to settle on the island and were afraid that the Makassar might return after their departure. They returned after several years and raised a fortress armed with four cannon and staffed by 24 soldiers in 1658 at the southern coast of Kayeli Bay, in the eastern part of Buru. A permanent settlement was established at the fortress, which became the administrative center of the island. About 2,000 native inhabitants of the island were forcibly relocated to this area from other parts of the island, including much of the tribal nobility, and about thirteen large villages were built around the fort: Lumaite, Hukumina, Palamata, Tomahu, Masarete, Waisama, Marulat, Leliali, Tagalisa, Ilat, Kayeli, Bara and Lisela. The relocation was designed to facilitate control over the local population and provide a workforce for clove fields which were being planted by the Dutch in this part of the island. The Kayeli ethnicity with its own language was formed as a mixture of the newly arriving settlers and the native population of the fort area.

The presence among the ancestors of the tribal aristocracy and interaction with the Dutch colonial administration resulted in a special position for the Kayeli over the next centuries, who claimed the role of indigenous elite of the island. In particularly, they requested donations from each clan of Buru, which could be rice, millet, coconuts, sago, sweet potatoes and tobacco, as well as supplying men to work exclusively for the Kayeli rajas.

The Dutch East India Company was abolished in the early 19th century, and all its possessions in the Malay archipelago came under the direct control of the Dutch crown. In 1824, as part of the reform of the colonial administration, Buru was divided into 14 regencies (this number was gradually reduced to seven over the next 100 years). They were headed by the local rulers, rajas, who were subordinate to the Dutch advisors. All rajas were selected from the Kayeli tribal nobles, who had by this time proved their loyalty to the Dutch.

The demise of Kayeli dominance began in the 1880s, when the leaders of Leliali, Wae Sama and Fogi clans moved significant parts of their ethnic groups to their original settlements; they were joined in the early 1900s by Tagalisa. By then, many other of the original 13 Kayeli villages were either abandoned or had lost their rajas. By about 1910, the leading role of the Kayeli clan had almost disappeared.

=== Transition years 1942–1950 ===
From the spring of 1942 to the summer of 1945, the entire Dutch East Indies, including Buru, were occupied by the Japanese army. During this period, the island was raided by the bombers of the Allies aiming to incapacitate the Japanese military infrastructure, in particular the airport at Namlea, the major town of Buru.

After the capitulation of Japan on 2 September 1945, control over the island fell back to the Netherlands. In December 1946, Buru, along with the other Maluku Islands, Sulawesi and Lesser Sunda Islands, was included in a quasi-independent State of East Indonesia (Indonesian: Negara Indonesia Timur) which was established by the Dutch government to gradually transform their former colonial possessions in the East Indies into a dependent state. In December 1949, eastern Indonesia joined the Republic of the United States of Indonesia (Indonesian: Republik Indonesia Serikat RIS) established at the Dutch–Indonesian Round Table Conference of 23 August – 2 November 1949.

In April 1950, just before the abolition of RIS and inclusion of most of eastern Indonesia to the Republic of Indonesia, the local authorities of Buru, Ambon, Seram and several smaller nearby islands proclaimed the establishment of an independent Republic of South Moluccas (Indonesian: Republik Maluku Selatan, RMS) and committed to maintain close political ties with the Netherlands. After unsuccessful attempts to absorb the RMS through negotiations, the Republic of Indonesia initiated a six-month military conflict in July 1950. In December 1950, Buru was brought under the control of Indonesian troops and proclaimed part of the Republic of Indonesia.

=== As part of Indonesia ===
Between 1950 and 1965, the policy of the new government was aimed at rapid social, political and economic integration of Buru into Indonesia. In the 1960s and 1970s, during the military regime of General Soeharto, Buru became one of the main places of exile and imprisonment of political dissidents – primarily communists and other left-wing representatives, as well as dissident intellectuals. Most camps were closed on Buru in 1980. More than 12,000 people had served a prison sentence in those camps by then, and at least several hundred had died or been killed.

One of the prisoners was a prominent Indonesian writer, Pramoedya Ananta Toer, who spent 14 years (1965–1979) in prison, mostly on Buru, and wrote there many of his novels. Those included a large part of the Buru Quartet, in particular its first part This Earth of Mankind. Until 1975, Toer was deprived of writing tools. He committed his novels to memory and was reciting them to his cellmates, partly relying on their memory.

During the late 1970s, a number of transmigrants from Java arrived at Buru. These transmigrants, along with the political prisoners, established thousands of hectares of rice fields on the island and built irrigation systems in the Waeapo River alluvial plain, significantly increasing local rice production and making it the largest rice producer in the Maluku Islands.

== Economy ==
Year	Growth, %	GDP, billion IDR
2001	0.38	123.657
2002	1.08	124.989
2003	2.90	128.610
2004	3.27	132.821
2005	3.79	137.851
2006	4.80	144.470
2007	4.36	150.767
2008	4.60	157.709

Economic development of the island was depressed in the late 1990s as a result of the national and regional crisis. The growth resumed in the early 2000s, however, unemployment remains high (9.92% of the population in 2008), and more than 37% of islanders are living below the national poverty line (as of 2008).

The basis of the island's economy is agriculture which contributed 51.22% to the GDP in 2008. The major crop is rice with plantations taking an area of more than 5,700 hectares and yielding about 23,000 tonnes per the year (for 2008) in just Buru Regency. Most rice fields are located on the northern coasts of the island, in the districts of Namlea, Waeapo and Air Buaya. With the total area of 135 hectares, maize dominates the southern field of districts Waisama, Kepalamadan and Namrole, yielding 176 tonnes per year (as of 2008). Other crops of the southern part are sweet potato (211 hectares, 636 tonnes), beans (926 hectares, 946 tonnes ) and soybeans (965 hectares, 965 tonnes). Coco (5,724 ha, 2,742 tonnes), cocoa (4,453 ha, 2,368 tonnes), clove (947 ha, 881 tonnes) and coffee (114 acres (46 ha), 1223 tonnes) are grown in the Namlea, Air Buaya, Waeapo, Batubual and Waplau areas, whereas nutmeg (143 ha, 75 tonnes) is restricted to Batubual. Teak plantations are found almost everywhere on Buru and complement the natural sources of timber.

Animal farming is of secondary importance, but its role is gradually increasing. The major animals are cows (41,349 animals as of 2008), buffalo (3,699), chickens (more than 1,346,000), ducks (195,000), sheep (26,950), domestic pigs (1,276) and horses (497). In 2008, there were 410 fishing enterprises with the annual catch of 3,891 tonnes of fish and seafood. The major commercial species are tuna (900 tonnes), sardines (420 tonnes) and mackerel (385 tonnes).

The industry employs only about 2,700 islanders and contributes about 7% to the GDP. Among the 537 enterprises registered in 2008, 482 were engaged in processing of agricultural products and 44 in engineering, chemicals and repair. In January 2010, the Ministry of Industry of Indonesia has approved a plan to build major cement plants on the island. The expansion of tourism is hindered by the lack of infrastructure on the island.

Apart from agriculture and engineering, other significant economic areas are trade, hotel industry and catering (19.19% of GDP in 2008), custom services (12.74%), transport and communication (3.10%), construction (3.13%), financial sector (2.64%) and energy and water (0.49%).

== Transportation ==
Buru is linked with other parts of Indonesia via sea routes and has two main ports in Namlea and Namrole. With 866 registered cargo and passenger vessels, the average transport rate in 2008 was 400 tonnes per day. Speedboats "Bahari Express" run daily between Namlea and the capital of Maluku Province, Ambon (distance 160 km, travel time three hours).

By agreement between the administration of Buru district and local military authorities, the military airfield at Namlea (runway 750 meters) is used for air transportation. Aircraft CASA C-212 Aviocar make 96 passenger flights a year between Namlea and several towns of Maluku. In 2007, construction began of a civil airport near the villages of Suva and Namrole, about 30 km south-west of Namlea.

In absence of railways, most local transportation occurs via the roads. In 2008, their total length was 1,310 km, of which 278 km was covered with asphalt, 282 km with gravel and the rest were laid in soil. The construction project of a modern, 287-kilometre-long (178 mi) highway across the island, connecting its two major towns of Namlea and Namrole and several other towns is delayed due to underfunding. There is a regular long-distance bus service supported by a park of 18 units.

== Health ==
As of 2007, the medical system of the island was in a poor state due to underfunding and lack of qualified medical personnel. There were two hospitals and 16 clinics, five of which were first-aid clinics and 11 were serving non-emergency patients who could arrive there on their own. The medical staff consisted of 22 doctors (two with the medical degree), 65 obstetricians and 303 nurses. The authorities plan to increase the number of medical facilities and staff by 2–4 times by 2012.

== Traditional occupations and culture ==
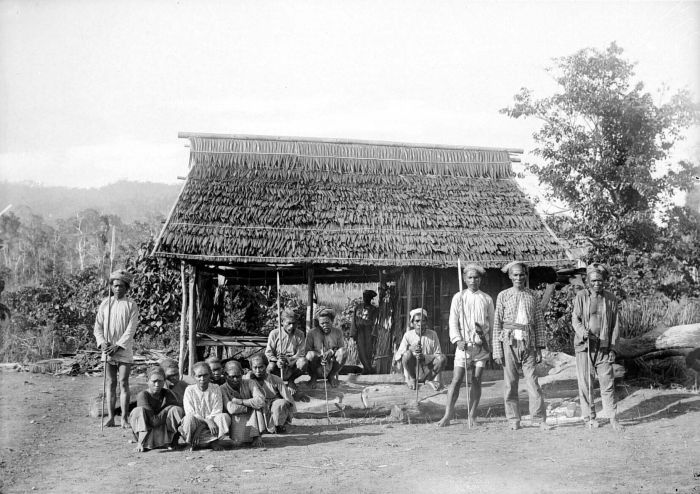
Traditional Buru house of the early 1900s

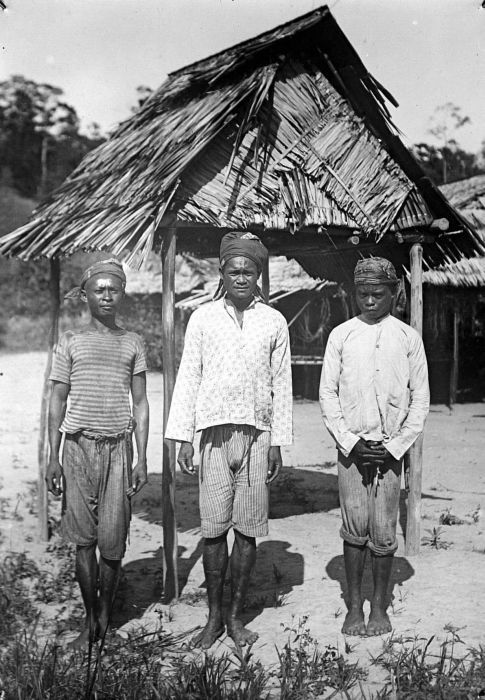
Lisela men at a village, early 20th century.

Whereas local people traditionally occupied villages, variation of their seasonal activities – predominantly hunting and farming – tended to either disperse or gather them. Men hunted the wild pig Buru babirusa, deer and possum, in the forests, mostly during the peak of east monsoon (June and July); meanwhile women were gathering wild vegetables. However, during the west monsoon (November to April) both men and women were working together in the fields. The position of the villages was also changing with time, mostly because of the low soil fertility on the island – recovery of the soil took significant time urging long-distance travel to the new fields. It was rather common for a family to leave the village for most of the week to their field and return only for the religious service on Sunday. It was also rather common to move the entire village after some 20 years of exploiting a plot of land. Partly because of this, most settlements were rather small, with the smallest type accommodating one-two families (hum-hawa or hum-tapa), middle-type (hum-lolin) consisting of 3–10 houses and accommodating 20–50 people, and larger ones of 30–50 houses and 150–300 people (fen-lale). On the coast, there were several multi-ethnic settlements with more than 200 houses (ibu kota kecamatan). This local variety of terms for a "settlement" puzzled the Dutch colonizers trying to systematise the local registries.

Traditional Buru houses were made from bamboo, often on stilts. The roofs were covered with palm leaves or reeds. Cement, metal and tiles were introduced in the 20th century and urged to build more permanent dwelling, but with limited results, as the locals continued to relocate. This was partly due to the habits of relocation and partly due to local disputes or superstitions, such as cursing a place where a certain number of people died within a short period. Presence of a church in a village might hinder relocation for a century, but not always. Traditional Buru costumes are similar those of most other Indonesia peoples. Men wear sarong (a kind of kilt) and a long-skirted tunic, and women are dressed in sarong and a shorter jacket. However, the dress color systematically varies between the different tribes of the island.

== Research ==
The unique flora, fauna and tropical forest ecosystem of the island are systematically researched by both Indonesian and foreign scientific bodies. The original vegetation on the coastal plain has been cleared, and much of the mountain forest on the northern side of the island has been cut and burned out for timber and creating new farming fields, but two large areas of stable rain forest still exist in the mountains. These are currently protected areas, Gunung Kapalat Mada (1,380 km^{2}) and Waeapo (50 km^{2}).

Most of the published studies on the history, culture and languages of the island were conducted in the 1980s out by spouses Charles E. Grimes and Barbara Dix Grimes – Australian missionaries and ethnographers and active members of SIL International (they should not be confused with Joseph E. Grimes and Barbara F. Grimes, Charles' parents, also known Australian ethnographers). They have also completed translation of the Bible to Buru language, which was started by the early Dutch missionaries.

== See also ==
- Waeapo River
