= Namlea =

- Town
- Location in the Maluku Islands of Indonesia
- Coordinates: 3°15′S 127°5′E
- Country: Indonesia
- Province: Maluku
- Regency: Buru

Area
  - Total: 951.15 km^{2} (367.24 sq mi)

Population (mid 2022 estimate)
  - Total: 37,869
  - Density: 39.814/km^{2} (103.12/sq mi)
- Time zone: UTC+9 (WIB)

Namlea is a town and district (kecamatan) situated on the north side of Kayeli Bay on the northeastern coast of the Indonesian island of Buru. It is the capital of the Buru Regency.

== Climate ==
Namlea has a tropical savanna climate (Aw) with moderate to heavy rainfall from December to July and moderate to little rainfall from August to November. Due to a strong rainshadow effect, it has the lowest rainfall on Buru Island.

Climate data for Namlea
Month	Jan	Feb	Mar	Apr	May	Jun	Jul	Aug	Sep	Oct	Nov	Dec	Year
Mean daily maximum °C (°F)	30.8 (87.4)	30.8 (87.4)	30.8 (87.4)	30.4 (86.7)	29.6 (85.3)	29.1 (84.4)	28.1 (82.6)	28.4 (83.1)	29.4 (84.9)	30.1 (86.2)	31.4 (88.5)	31.0 (87.8)	30.0 (86.0)
Daily mean °C (°F)	27.3 (81.1)	27.2 (81.0)	27.3 (81.1)	27.1 (80.8)	26.6 (79.9)	26.4 (79.5)	25.6 (78.1)	25.7 (78.3)	26.2 (79.2)	26.5 (79.7)	27.7 (81.9)	27.4 (81.3)	26.7 (80.2)
Mean daily minimum °C (°F)	23.8 (74.8)	23.7 (74.7)	23.8 (74.8)	23.8 (74.8)	23.7 (74.7)	23.7 (74.7)	23.2 (73.8)	23.0 (73.4)	23.0 (73.4)	22.9 (73.2)	24.0 (75.2)	23.8 (74.8)	23.5 (74.4)
Average rainfall mm (inches)	194 (7.6)	145 (5.7)	141 (5.6)	84 (3.3)	100 (3.9)	124 (4.9)	149 (5.9)	33 (1.3)	36 (1.4)	29 (1.1)	86 (3.4)	136 (5.4)	1,257 (49.5)
Source: Climate-Data.org
