= Buru Regency =

Regency in Maluku, Indonesia

Buru Regency Kabupaten Buru
- Regency
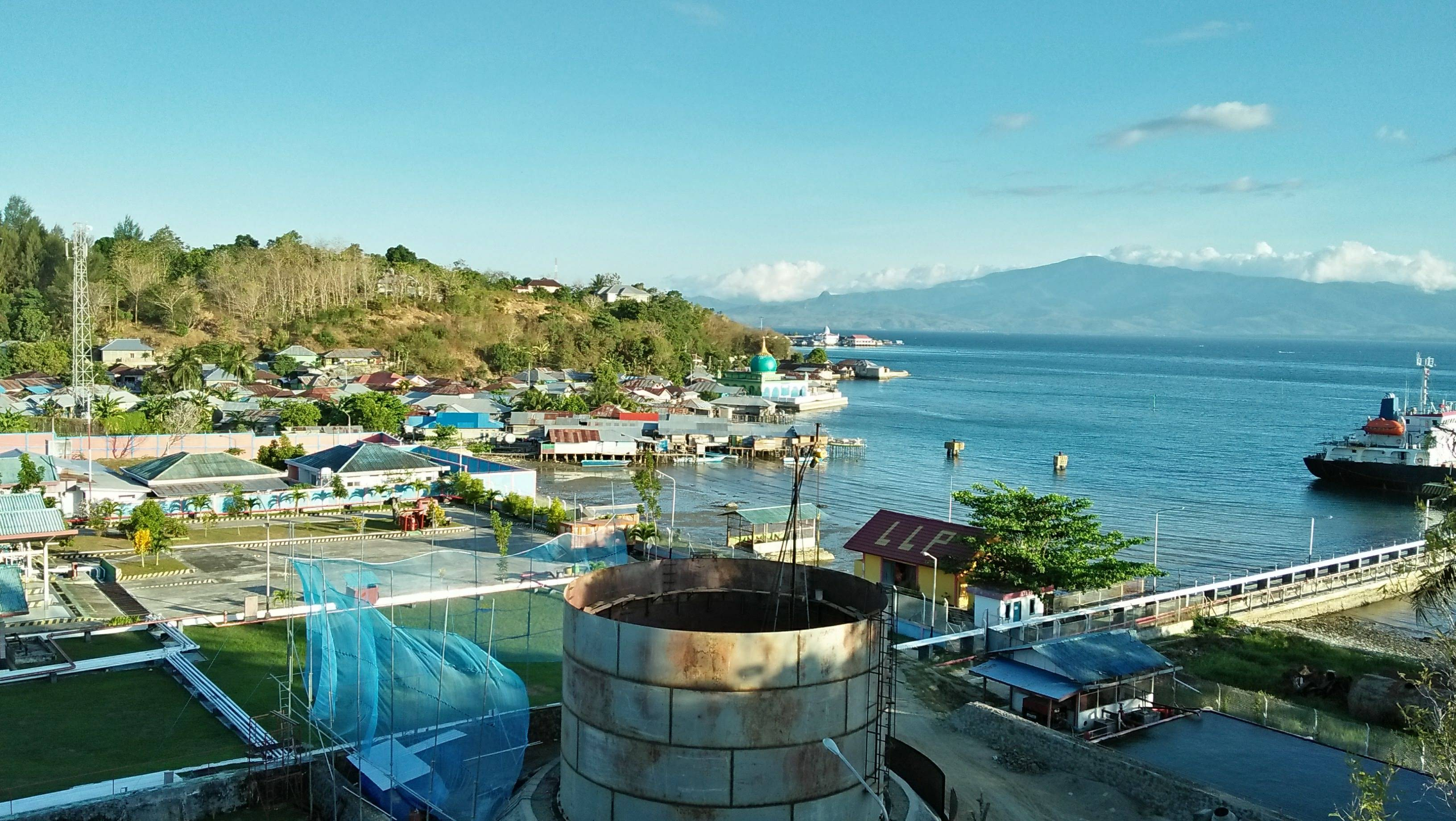
- Coastal area of Buru Island

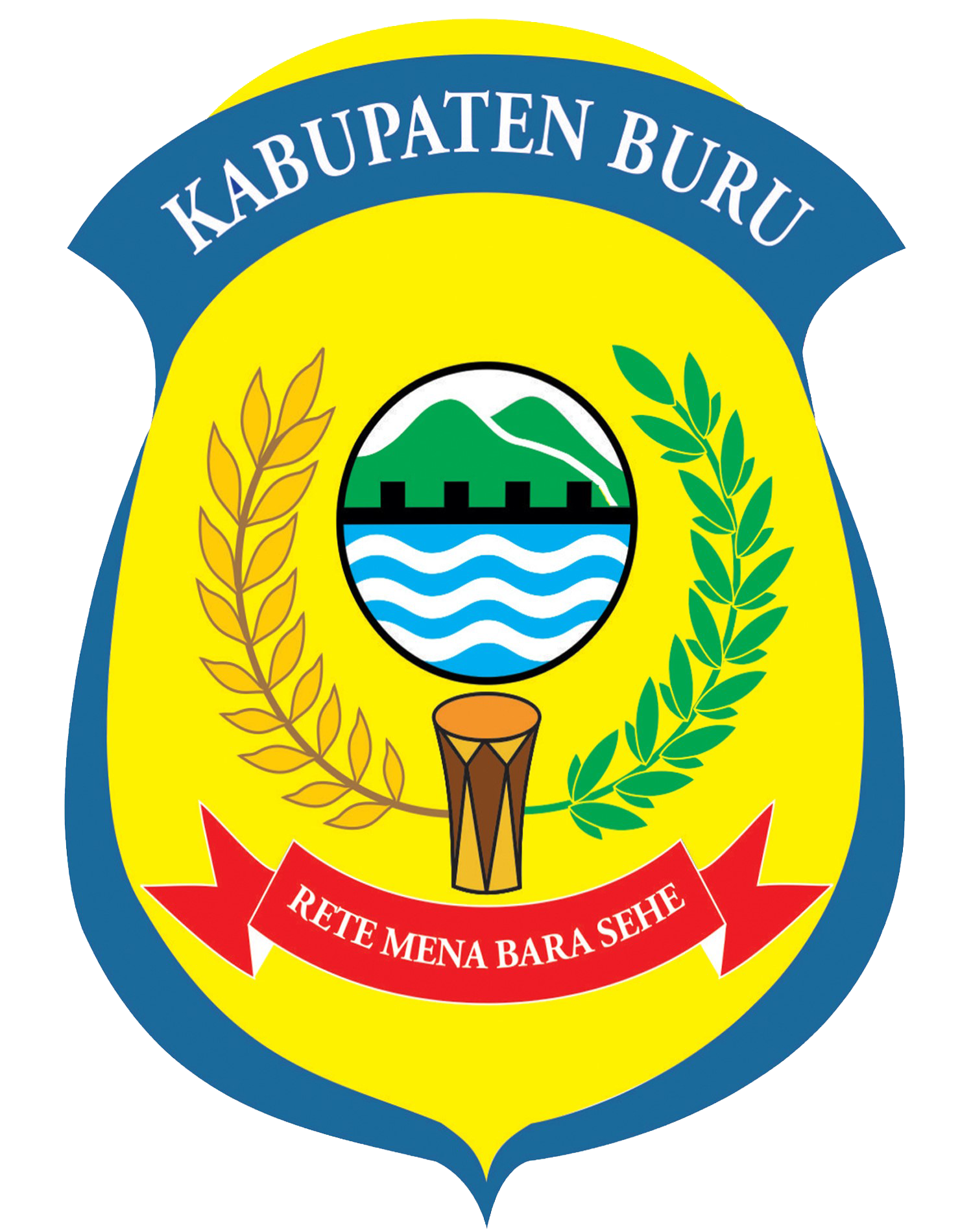
- Coat of arms
- Motto: Retemena Barasehe (Keep Moving Forward, Never Give Up)
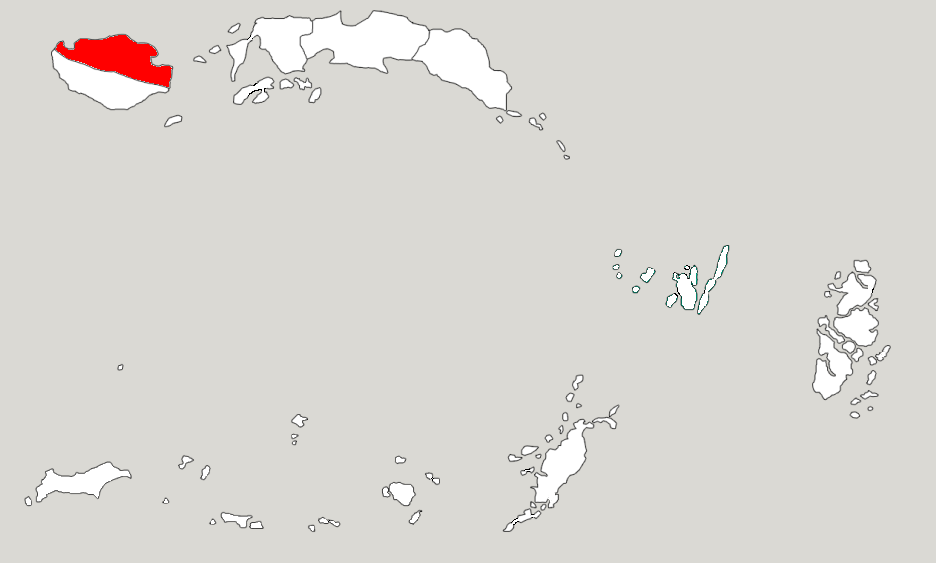
- Location within Maluku

- Location in Maluku and Indonesia Buru Regency (Indonesia)
- Coordinates: 3.3277°S 126.6841°E
- Country: Indonesia
- Province: Maluku
- Capital: Namlea

Government
  - Regent: Ikram Umasugi
  - Vice Regent: Sudarmo

Area
  - Total: 7,595.58 km^{2} (2,932.67 sq mi)

Population (mid 2023 estimate)
  - Total: 139,408
  - Density: 18.3538/km^{2} (47.5362/sq mi)
- Time zone: UTC+9 (IEST)
- Area code: (+62) 913
- Website: burukab.go.id

Buru Regency is a regency of Maluku province, Indonesia. When it was first created on 4 October 1999 (by separation from Central Maluku Regency), the regency encompassed the entire island (plus outlying islands); but on 24 June 2008 the southern 40% of the island was split off to form a separate Buru Selatan (South Buru) Regency. The residual Buru Regency comprises the northern 60% of the island of Buru and covers an area of 7,595.58 km^{2}. The population at the 2010 census was 108,445 and at the 2020 census this had increased to 135,238; the official estimate as at mid 2023 was 139,408 (comprising 70,598 males and 68,810 females). The capital lies at Namlea.

== Administrative districts ==
At the time of the 2010 census the Buru Regency was divided into five districts (kecamatan), but subsequently this has been increased to ten districts by the splitting of the existing districts. The ten districts are tabulated below with their areas and their populations at the 2010 census and the 2020 census, together with the official estimates as at mid 2023. The table also includes the location of the district headquarters, the number of administrative villages (all classed as rural desa) in each district, and its postal codes.

Kode Wilayah	Name of District (kecamatan)	Area in km^{2}	Pop'n census 2010	Pop'n census 2020	Pop'n estimate mid 2023	Admin centre	No. of villages	Post codes
81.04.01	Namlea	951.15	37,218	36,680	37,264	Namlea	7	97571
81.04.03	Waeapo ^{(a)}	102.50	34,153	12,040	12,692	Waenetat	7	97578
81.04.06	Waplau	585.23	10,000	12,698	13,186	Waplau	10	97573
81.04.10	Batabual ^{(b)}	108.60	8,147	9,439	9,261	Ilath	5	97574
81.04.14	Teluk Kaiely (Kaiely Bay)	141.08	^{(c)}	3,998	4,412	Kaiely	5	97577
81.04.12	Waelata	234.50	^{(c)}	13,581	14,482	Basakale	10	97579
81.04.11	Lolong Guba	457.02	^{(c)}	12,465	13,315	Kubalahin	10	97576
81.04.15	Lilialy	481.50	^{(c)}	11,208	11,181	Sawa	5	97570
81.04.02	Air Buaya	1,702.35	18,927	12,019	12,082	Air Buaya	10	97572
81.04.13	Fena Leisela	2,831.65	^{(c)}	11,190	11,533	Wainlana	13	97575
	Totals	7,595.58	108,445	135,238	139,408	Namlea	82	

Notes: (a) including the offshore islands of Pulau Nirwana Besar and Pulau Nirwana Kecil. (b) including the offshore island of Pulau Batukapal. (c) the 2010 populations of these new districts are included in the figures for the districts from which they were split away.
