= Laut =

Laut may refer to:

== Places ==
- Laut Island, South Kalimantan, Indonesia
- Laut Island, Natuna Regency, Riau Islands, Indonesia
- Nusa Laut, an island in Maluku, Indonesia

== People ==
- Agnes Christina Laut (1871–1936), Canadian journalist, novelist, historian, and social worker
- Dave Laut (1956–2009), American athlete
- Frank Laut (1884–1961), Canadian politician
- Gerard Yepes Laut (born 2002), Spanish footballer
- Peter Laut, Danish physicist

== Other uses ==
- Laut.de, German music magazine

== See also ==
- Serui-Laut language
- Nusa Laut language
- Orang Laut language
- Wadapi-Laut language
- Lout (disambiguation)
