= Saparua language =

Austronesian language spoken in Maluku, Indonesia

Saparua
- Iha
- Native to: Indonesia
- Region: Seram and Saparua Islands, Maluku
- Native speakers: (10,200 cited 1989)
- Language family: Austronesian: Malayo-Polynesian (MP); Central–Eastern MP; Central Maluku ?; East Central Maluku; Seram ?; Nunusaku; Piru Bay; East; Solehua; Seram Straits; Uliase; Saparua

Language codes
- ISO 639-3: spr
- Glottolog: sapa1251
- ELP: Saparua

Saparua is an Austronesian language spoken in Maluku of eastern Indonesia. Dialects are diverse, and Latu might be included as one. Saparua is currently spoken by around 1,500 people, and it is threatened by extinction. According to a researcher from the National Research and Innovation Agency, Khairunnisa, stated that this is caused by the influences of Dutch colonialism, the sectarian conflict, migration, globalization, and the duty to speak Indonesian.

== Phonology ==
Consonants
		Labial	Alveolar	Palatal	Velar	Glottal
Nasal		m	n			
Plosive/ Affricate	voiceless	p	t		k	(ʔ)
Plosive/ Affricate	voiced	b	d	dʒ	ɡ	
Fricative			s			h
Rhotic			r			
Lateral			l			
Approximant		w		j		

[ʔ] only appears when within the sequence of vowels.

Vowels
	Front	Central	Back
Close	i		u
Close-mid	e	ə	o
Open-mid	ɛ	ə	ɔ
Open		a	
