= Nusa Laut language =

Austronesian language spoken in Maluku, Indonesia

Nusa Laut
- Native to: Indonesia, Moluccas
- Region: Lease Islands (Nusa Laut)
- Ethnicity: 2,200 (1989)
- Extinct: c. 2000 (10 speakers cited 1989)
- Language family: Austronesian: Malayo-Polynesian; Central–Eastern; Central Maluku ?; East Central Maluku; Seram ?; Nunusaku; Piru Bay; East; Solehua; Seram Straits; Uliase; Nusa Laut

Language codes
- ISO 639-3: nul
- Glottolog: nusa1245
- ELP: Nusa Laut

Nusa Laut is an Austronesian language spoken on the island of the same name in the Moluccas in eastern Indonesia.
