= Haruku language =

Austronesian language spoken in Maluku, Indonesia

Haruku
- Native to: Indonesia
- Region: Haruku Island, Moluccas
- Native speakers: (20,000 cited 1989)
- Language family: Austronesian: Malayo-Polynesian; Central–Eastern; Central Maluku ?; East Central Maluku; Seram ?; Nunusaku; Piru Bay; East; Solehua; Seram Straits; Uliase; Haruku

Language codes
- ISO 639-3: hrk
- Glottolog: haru1244

Haruku is an Austronesian language spoken on Haruku Island, just east of Ambon Island in eastern Indonesia, part of a dialect chain around Seram Island.

Each villages, Hulaliu, Pelauw, Kailolo, and Rohomoni–Kabauw, is said to have its own dialect.
