= Laha language (Indonesia) =

Austronesian language spoken in Maluku, Indonesia

Laha
- Native to: Indonesia
- Region: Ambon Island, Maluku
- Native speakers: (3,900 cited 1987)
- Language family: Austronesian: Malayo-Polynesian; Central–Eastern; Central Maluku ?; East Central Maluku; Seram ?; Nunusaku; Piru Bay; East; Seram Straits; Ambon; Laha

Language codes
- ISO 639-3: lhh
- Glottolog: laha1251
- ELP: Laha (Indonesia)

Laha is an Austronesian language spoken on Ambon Island in eastern Indonesia.
