= Kamarian language =

Extinct language formerly spoken in Maluku, Indonesia

Kamarian
- Native to: Indonesia
- Region: west Seram Island, Moluccas
- Ethnicity: 6,000 in Kamarian village (1987)
- Extinct: c.2000
- Language family: Austronesian: Malayo-Polynesian; Central–Eastern; Central Maluku ?; East Central Maluku; Seram ?; Nunusaku; Piru Bay; East; Solehua; Seram Straits; Uliase; Kamarian

Language codes
- ISO 639-3: kzx
- Glottolog: kama1362
- ELP: Kamarian

Kamarian is an extinct Austronesian language. It was spoken at the southwestern coast of Seram Island in the Moluccas in eastern Indonesia.
