= Uhei Kaclakin language =

Uhei Kaclakin (Uhei Kachlakan, Uhei Kahlakim) may be either of two neighboring languages,

- Liana language
- Benggoi language
