= Latu language =

Austronesian language spoken in Maluku, Indonesia

Latu
- Native to: Indonesia
- Region: Seram Island, Moluccas
- Native speakers: (2,100 cited 1982)
- Language family: Austronesian: Malayo-Polynesian (MP); Central–Eastern MP; Central Maluku ?; East Central Maluku; Seram ?; Nunusaku; Piru Bay; East; Solehua; Seram Straits; Uliase; Latu

Language codes
- ISO 639-3: ltu
- Glottolog: latu1237

Latu is an Austronesian language spoken on Seram Island in the Moluccas in eastern Indonesia. It is linguistically close to Saparua.
