= Asilulu language =

Austronesian language spoken in Maluku, Indonesia

Asilulu
- Native to: Indonesia
- Region: Ambon Island, Maluku
- Native speakers: (8,800 cited 1987)
- Language family: Austronesian: Malayo-Polynesian (MP); Central–Eastern MP; Central Maluku ?; East Central Maluku; Seram ?; Nunusaku; Piru Bay; West; Asilulu languages; Asilulu
- Dialects: Negeri Lima; Nuclear Asilulu; Ureng

Language codes
- ISO 639-3: asl
- Glottolog: asil1242

Asilulu is an Austronesian language of Ambon Island in the Moluccas, with some speakers on west Seram. It is a local trade language.
