= Sepa–Teluti language =

Austronesian language spoken in Indonesia

Sepa–Teluti
- Native to: Indonesia
- Region: Seram Island, Maluku
- Native speakers: (20,000 cited 1989)
- Language family: Austronesian: Malayo-Polynesian (MP); Central–Eastern MP; Central Maluku ?; East Central Maluku; Seram ?; Nunusaku; Piru Bay; East; Sepa–Teluti

Language codes
- ISO 639-3: Either: spb – Sepa tlt – Teluti (Sou Nama)
- Glottolog: east2757

Sepa–Teluti is an Austronesian language of Seram Island in eastern Indonesia.
