= Paulohi language =

Austronesian language spoken in Maluku, Indonesia

Paulohi
- Solehua
- Native to: Indonesia
- Region: Seram Island, Maluku
- Native speakers: very few (2007) (50 cited 1982)
- Language family: Austronesian: Malayo-Polynesian; Central–Eastern; Central Maluku ?; East Central Maluku; Seram ?; Nunusaku; Piru Bay; East; Solehua; Paulohi

Language codes
- ISO 639-3: plh
- Glottolog: paul1238
- ELP: Paulohi

Paulohi is a nearly extinct Austronesian language spoken on Seram Island in eastern Indonesia.
