= Wahai language =

Wahai may be :

- Saleman language
- Manusela language
