= Bemu =

Town in Indonesia

Bemu Bemo Perak
- Village
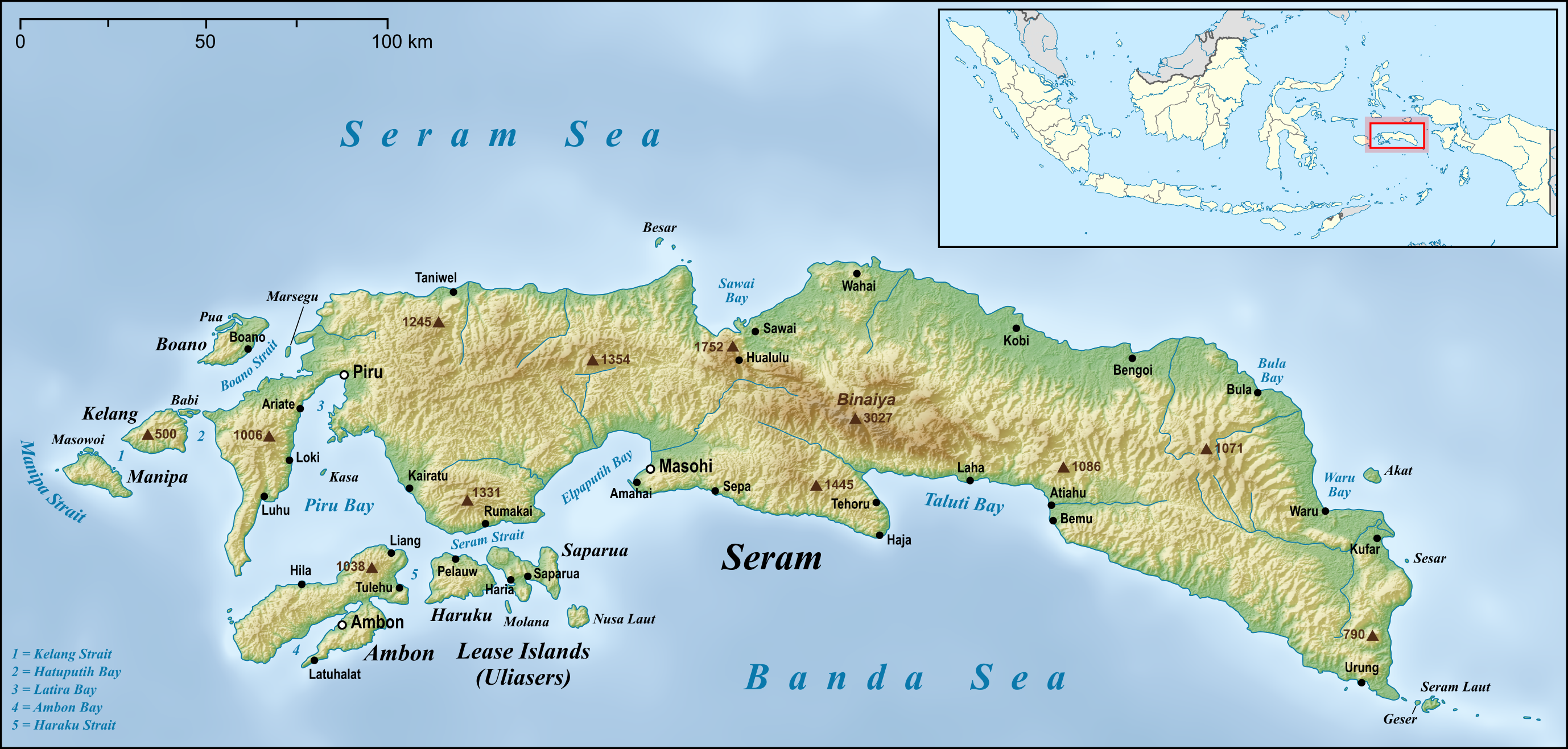
- Location in Seram Island
- Coordinates: 3°24′15″S 129°58′29″E
- Country: Indonesia
- Province: Maluku
- Regency: East Seram
- District: Werinama
- Time zone: UTC+8 (WITA)

Bemu, also known as Bemo Perak, is a village on the southeastern coast of the Indonesian island of Seram, just to the south of Atiahu. It is one of the principal settlements on Telutih Bay.
