= KZB =

KZB or kzb may refer to:

- KZB, the IATA code for Zachar Bay Seaplane Base, Alaska, United States
- kzb, the ISO 639-3 code for Kaibobo language, Malukus, Indonesia
- An acronym referring to Kim Zolciak-Biermann of The Real Housewives of Atlanta fame.
