= Hoti language =

Austronesian language spoken in Maluku, Indonesia

Hoti
- Native to: Indonesia (Maluku Islands)
- Region: east Seram
- Extinct: late 20th century
- Language family: Austronesian: Malayo-Polynesian; Central–Eastern; Central Maluku; East Central Maluku; East Seram; Setic; Hoti

Language codes
- ISO 639-3: hti
- Glottolog: hoti1237
- ELP: Hoti

Hoti is an extinct Austronesian language of Seram, Indonesia, once spoken by the Hoti People. It was spoken by 10 elderly people in 1987, but was likely extinct by 2007. It is said to have been replaced by Geser.
