= Bati language =

Bati language may refer to:

- Bati language (Indonesia)
- Bati language (Cameroon)
- Bati (Ti) dialect of the Nga'ka language (Cameroon)
- Bati (Baati) dialect of the Bwa language (DR Congo)
