= Kaibobo language =

Austronesian language spoken in Maluku, Indonesia

Kaibobo
- Native to: Indonesia
- Region: Piru Bay, Seram Island, Malukus
- Native speakers: (500 cited 1983)
- Language family: Austronesian: Malayo-Polynesian; Central–Eastern; Central Maluku ?; East Central Maluku; Seram ?; Nunusaku; Piru Bay; East; Seram Straits; Uliase (Lease); Kamarian?; Kaibobo
- Dialects: Kaibobo; Hatusua

Language codes
- ISO 639-3: kzb
- Glottolog: kaib1244
- ELP: Kaibobo

Kaibobo is an Austronesian language spoken in the Malukus of eastern Indonesia. Kaibobo and Hatusua dialects are distinct.
