= Banggoi =

- Village
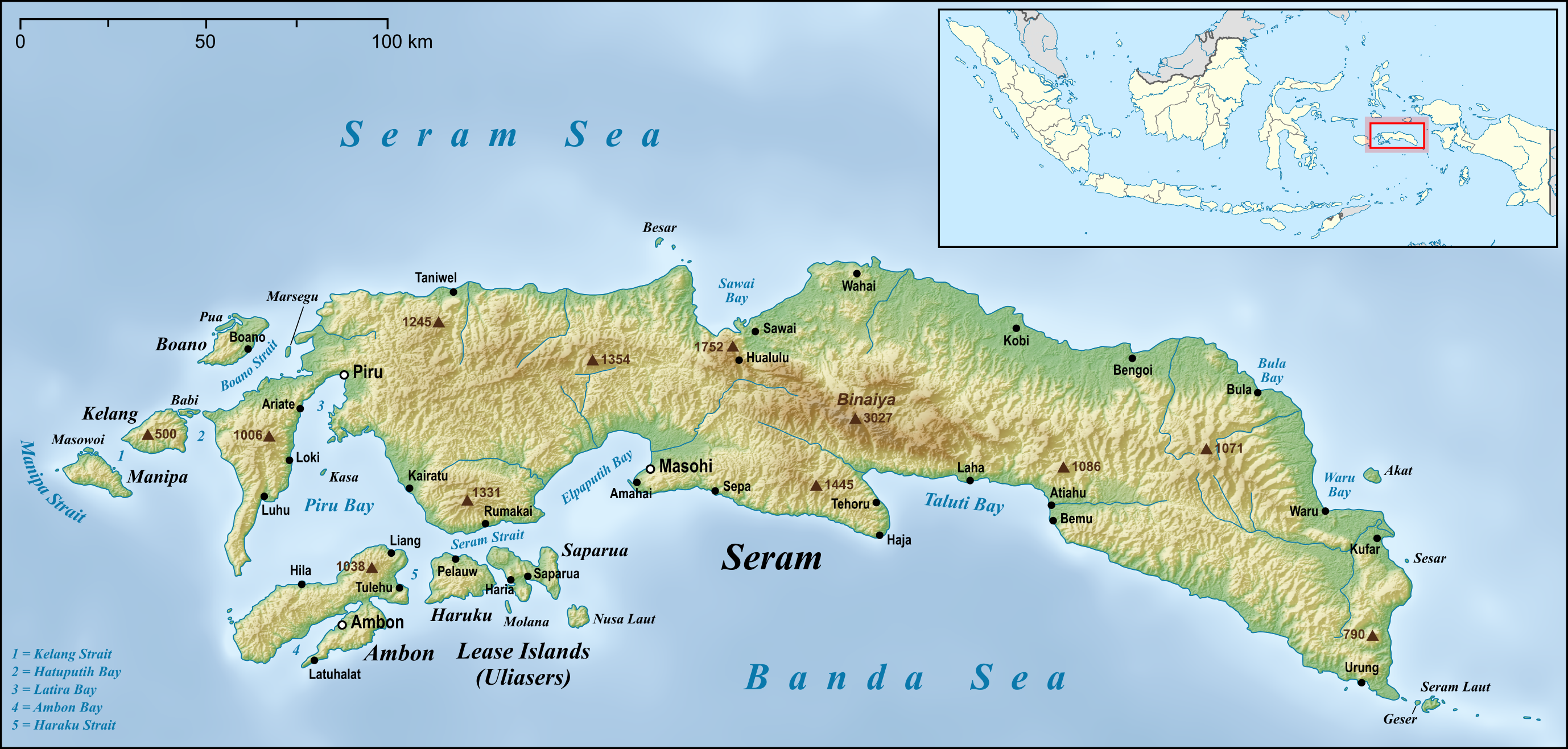
- Location in Seram Island
- Coordinates: 3°0′24″S 130°10′31″E
- Country: Indonesia
- Province: Maluku
- Regency: East Seram
- Time zone: UTC+8 (WITA)

Banggoi is a village on the northeastern coast of the Indonesian island of Seram. The Bengoi language is spoken by some 350 people in Bengoi and surrounding areas.
