= Piru Bay languages =

Language family

Piru Bay
- Geographic distribution: Ambon and Seram, Indonesia
- Linguistic classification: Austronesian: Malayo-Polynesian (MP); Central-Eastern MP; Central Maluku ?; East Central Maluku; Seram ?; Nunusaku; Piru Bay

Language codes
- Glottolog: piru1243

The Piru Bay languages are a group of twenty Malayo-Polynesian languages, spoken on Ambon Island and around Piru Bay on the island of Seram, Indonesia. None of the languages have more than about twenty thousand speakers, and several are endangered with extinction.

== Classification ==
The languages are as follows:

- Piru Bay
  - West Piru Bay (Seram and Ambon islands)
    - Asilulu
    - Hoamoal: Luhu (Piru), Manipa, Larike-Wakasihu, Boano
  - East Piru Bay
    - Sepa, Teluti
    - Solehua
      - Paulohi
      - Seram Straits
        - Kaibobo
        - Ambon: Hitu, Tulehu, Laha, Seit-Kaitetu
        - Uliase (Lease Islands)
          - Kamarian
          - Hatuhaha
            - Haruku
            - Saparuan
              - Elpaputi: Amahai, Nusa Laut
              - Saparua: Saparua, Latu

Many of the Piru Bay languages form a dialect continuum. The Ambon branch should not to be confused with distantly related Ambonese Malay, which is also often simply known as Ambonese.
