= Moksela language =

Extinct language in Buru Island, Maluku

Moksela
- (unattested)
- Native to: Indonesia, Maluku
- Region: Buru Island
- Extinct: 1974
- Language family: Austronesian: Malayo-Polynesian (MP); Central–Eastern MP; Central Maluku?; Moksela

Language codes
- ISO 639-3: vms
- Glottolog: moks1249

Moksela is an extinct and unattested language spoken in the Buru Island of North Maluku province in Indonesia. Based on its location, it was presumably Malayo-Polynesian of the Central Maluku branch.
