= AMQ =

Amq, AMQ or amq may refer to:

- Amahai language (ISO 639: 1mq), spoken in Indonesia
- Approximate member query; see Quotient filter
- Pattimura Airport (IATA: AMQ), Indonesia
- An alternative spelling for Amqu, a region in Lebanon
- AM Quarterly, the official magazine of the Aston Martin Owners Club
- A software product from Red Hat

== See also ==
- Advanced Message Queuing Protocol (AMQP)
