= HIK =

HIK may refer to:

== Sport clubs ==
- Hangö Idrottsklubb, in Hanko, Finland
- Helenelunds IK, in Sollentuna, Sweden
- Hellerup IK, in Copenhagen, Denmark
- Hobro IK, in North Jutland, Denmark

== Other uses ==
- Hek, Yazd (Persian: هك; also romanized Hīk), a village in Iran
- Hezb-e Islami Khalis, a militant group in eastern Afghanistan
- Hikma Pharmaceuticals, a multinational pharmaceutical company
- Seit-Kaitetu language, a language of Maluku Islands, Indonesia
- Hin Keng station, Hong Kong (MTR station code)
