= Ambelau language =

Austronesian language spoken in Maluku, Indonesia

Ambelau
- Native to: Indonesia (Maluku)
- Region: Ambelau
- Native speakers: (5,700 cited 1989)
- Language family: Austronesian: Malayo-Polynesian (MP); Central–Eastern MP; Sula–Buru; Ambelau
- Writing system: none

Language codes
- ISO 639-3: amv
- Glottolog: ambe1248

Ambelau (Indonesian: Bahasa Ambelau) is an Austronesian language; in 1989, it was spoken by about 5,700 Ambelau people, of whom more than 5,000 lived on the Indonesian island Ambelau (Indonesian: Pulau Ambelau) and most others in the village Wae Tawa of the nearby island Buru (Indonesian: Pulau Buru).

The language is traditionally classified in a Central Maluku branch of Malayo-Polynesian languages; more recent classifications have placed it with the Sula–Buru languages. Although Ambelau island is only 20 km away from the much larger Buru island (population 135,000), the Ambelau language is rather different from all languages and dialects of Buru. The preservation of the language was also unaffected by the fact that Ambelau people compose only half of the Ambelau island population, and the communication with the Bugis and Javanese people composing the other half usually occurs in the official language of the country, Indonesian. The Ambelau language has no dialectal variation; so the Ambelau community on Buru island speaks identical language to that used on Ambelau. The language has no writing system.

The most detailed study of Ambelau language was conducted in the 1980s by Charles E. Grimes and Barbara Dix Grimes – Australian missionaries and ethnographers, active members of SIL International (they should not be confused with Joseph E. Grimes and Barbara F. Grimes, Charles' parents, also known Australian ethnographers).
