= Tulehu language =

Austronesian language spoken in Maluku, Indonesia

Tulehu
- Souw Aman Teru
- Native to: Indonesia
- Region: Ambon Island, Maluku
- Native speakers: (19,000 cited 1987)
- Language family: Austronesian: Malayo-Polynesian; Central–Eastern; Central Maluku ?; East Central Maluku; Seram ?; Nunusaku; Piru Bay; East; Seram Straits; Ambon; Tulehu

Language codes
- ISO 639-3: tlu
- Glottolog: tule1244

Tulehu (also known as Souw Aman Teru; literally means "the language of three villages") is an Austronesian language spoken on Ambon Island in eastern Indonesia, part of a dialect chain of Seram Island.

Tulehu is also the name of a village; each of the villages, Tulehu, Liang, Tengah-Tengah, and Tial, is said to have its own dialect.

== Phonology ==
Tulehu consonants
	Labial	Alveolar	Palatal	Velar	Glottal
Plosive	p	t		k	ʔ
Nasal	m	n		ŋ	
Fricative		s			h
Rhotic		r			
Lateral		l			
Approximant	w		j		

Voiced stops can also be heard from loanwords.

Tulehu vowels
	Front	Central	Back
Close	i		u
Mid	e		o
Open		a	
