= Mangole =

Mangole may refer to:

- Mangole Island, North Maluku province, Indonesia
- Mangole people, an ethnic group that inhabits Mangole Island
- Mangole language, a language spoken primarily spoken on Mangole Island
