= Sula language =

Austronesian language spoken in North Maluku, Indonesia

Sula
- Sanana
- Li Sua
- Native to: Indonesia, Maluku
- Region: Sula Islands
- Ethnicity: Sula
- Native speakers: (20,000 cited 1983)
- Language family: Austronesian: Malayo-Polynesian; Central–Eastern; Central Maluku; Sula–Buru; Sula languages; Sula
- Dialects: Facei; Fagudu; Falahu; Mangole

Language codes
- ISO 639-3: szn
- Glottolog: sula1245

Sula (Sanana) is a Malayo-Polynesian language of the Central Maluku branch. It is related to the Buru language. Sula is spoken mainly on the Sulabesi, with the Sanana as its center.

It is definitely endangered, currently under pressure from the local variety of Malay, known as Sula Malay.

Sula has borrowed many lexical items from Ambonese Malay, as well as Ternate, a more dominant language of North Maluku. Dutch loans have entered the language too, perhaps through Malay and Ternate. Standard Indonesian has also been influential.

Mangole is sometimes listed as a distinct language.

== Phonology ==
=== Consonants ===
		Labial	Alveolar	Palatal	Velar	Glottal
Plosive/ Affricate	voiceless	p	t	tʃ	k	ʔ
Plosive/ Affricate	voiced	b	d	dʒ	ɡ	
Nasal		m	n		ŋ	
Fricative		f	s	(ʃ)		h
Trill			r			
Lateral			l			
Approximant		w		j		

Voiced consonant sounds /b d ɡ/ may also be heard as devoiced [b̥ d̥ ɡ̊] in word-final position.

=== Vowels ===
	Front	Central	Back
Close	i		u
Mid	e		o
Open		a	

/e/ can also be heard as [ɛ] in lax form.
