= Cyrtodactylus nuaulu =

Conservation status
- Near Threatened (IUCN 3.1)

Scientific classification
- Kingdom: Animalia
- Phylum: Chordata
- Class: Reptilia
- Order: Squamata
- Suborder: Gekkota
- Family: Gekkonidae
- Genus: Cyrtodactylus
- Species: C. nuaulu

Binomial name
- Cyrtodactylus nuaulu P. Oliver, Edgar, Mumpuni, Iskandar & Lilley, 2009

Species of lizard

Cyrtodactylus nuaulu is a species of gecko, a lizard in the family Gekkonidae. The species is endemic to Indonesia.

== Etymology ==
The specific name, nuaulu, is in honor of the Nuaulu people.

== Geographic distribution ==
Cyrtodactylus nuaulu is found on Seram Island in Maluku Province, Indonesia.

== Habitat ==
The preferred natural habitat of Cyrtodactylus nuaulu is forest, at elevations as high as 1,500 m (4,900 ft).

== Behavior ==
Cyrtodactylus nuaulu is arboreal.

== Reproduction ==
Cyrtodactylus nuaulu is oviparous.

== Conservation status ==
Cyrtodactylus nuaulu is listed as Near Threatened on the IUCN Red List. The species is only known to occur in a small area and is threatened by illegal logging.
