= Amahai language =

Austronesian language spoken in Maluku, Indonesia

Amahai
- Native to: Indonesia
- Region: Seram Island, Moluccas
- Native speakers: 50 (2007)
- Language family: Austronesian: Malayo-Polynesian; Central–Eastern; Central Maluku ?; East Central Maluku; Seram ?; Nunusaku; Piru Bay; East; Solehua; Seram Straits; Uliase; Amahai
- Dialects: Makariki; Rutah; Soahuku

Language codes
- ISO 639-3: amq
- Glottolog: amah1245
- ELP: Amahai
- Amahai language is classified as Critically Endangered by the UNESCO Atlas of the World's Languages in Danger.

Amahai is a nearly extinct Austronesian language spoken in the Moluccas in eastern Indonesia. It might actually be two distinct languages.
