= TLU =

TLU may mean:

== Computing ==
- Tape Library Unit, an individual computer storage tape library
- Threshold Logical Unit in neural networks

== Universities ==
- Tallinn University
- Texas Lutheran University
- "The Lords University", a jocular acronym referring to BYU, Brigham Young University

== Transportation ==
- Golfo de Morrosquillo Airport (IATA airport code: TLU; ICAO airport code: SKTL) in Tolú, Sucre, Colombia
- Aero Toluca Internacional (ICAO airline code: TLU), see List of airline codes (A)
- The London Underground, the subway of London, England, UK

== Other uses ==
- The Last of Us (series), a video game series and media franchise
  - The Last of Us (2013 videogame) first game in the series
- Tulehu language (ISO 639 language code: tlu)
- St. Kitts and Nevis Trades and Labour Union
- Tropical Livestock Unit
