= BGY =

BGY or bgy may refer to:

- BGY, the IATA code for Orio al Serio International Airport, Bergamo, Italy
- bgy, the ISO 639-3 code for Benggoi language, Maluku Islands, Indonesia
