= Atiahu =

- Village
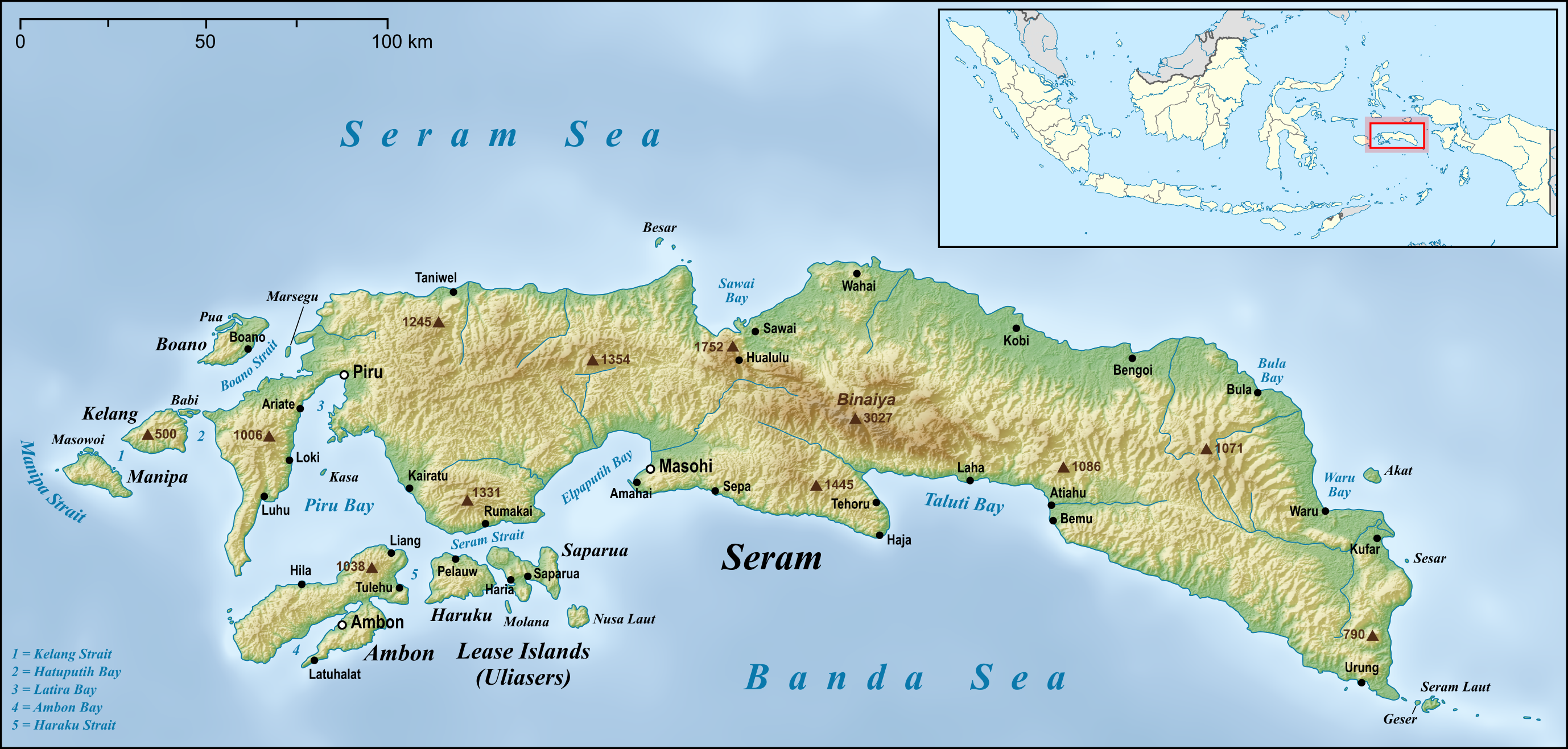
- Location in Seram Island
- Coordinates: 3°24′15″S 129°58′29″E
- Country: Indonesia
- Province: Maluku

Government
  - Jou (Raja): Muhammadiyah Wailissa

Area
  - Total: 125 km^{2} (48 sq mi)

Population (2023)
  - Total: 1.360
- Time zone: UTC+9 (WIT)

Atiahu is a village (negeri) in Siwalalat District, East Seram Regency, Maluku. This village is located at a river estuary in Telutih Bay, just north of Bemu (Bemo Perak). This is a fishing village. The Bobot language is spoken by the people of Atiahu and several surrounding villages.

The fam (matarumah) which has the right to be the head of the Atiahu village government comes from the Wailissa fam.

== Etymology ==
The name Atiahu itself is thought to come from the word ataha, which is the name for a group of people who previously lived around Hatumeten village. They are considered to be indigenous people who inhabit the eastern part of Seram Island. The term ataha for the Atiahu people itself is said to come from the name of the 'holy water' that flows in the land of Atiahu and the word aha itself means 'white' or 'holy'. So Atiahu is a settlement for a group of people who live around the 'holy river'. Thus the term ataha reflects the origins of the population of this country which is said to come from the interior of Seram Island.

== History ==
According to customs, the country of Atiahu is included in the group of Patalima community. The head of government of the Atiahu village itself is known as jou negeri or tuan raja. Atiahu's existence as a village began in 1683, when datuk Mailemang Wailissa was confirmed as the first king of Atiahu. After becoming king, he held a meeting with the traditional elders to agree on the name of their village. Then, as a result of the meeting, it was agreed that Atiahu would be the name of the village. The name Atiahu itself is considered to have broad meanings, one of which is inviting the "Ataha" people to gather with a purpose invites the Atiahu indigenous people who still live separately in the interior to come down to the coast and unite to form a settlement.

== Community ==
The following are some fam's (matarumah) who have inhabited the Atiahu village for generations. These matarumah were grouped into three soa.

- Soa Lihin
1. Hulukalla
2. Henlauw
3. Pakalessy
4. Tuny
- Soa Mabit
1. Lessy
2. Louw
3. Muar
- Soa Wailissa
1. Wailissa (raja; king)
2. Wailissa (imam; priest)
3. Wailissa (kapitang; captain)

== Geography ==
Atiahu village is located on the southern coast of East Seram Regency and has an area of around 125 km². It is bordered by Adabai village and Bemo Perak village to the south, Seram Sea, Naiwel Ahinulin village, Elnusa village, and Abulate village to the west, Naiwel Ahinulin village, petuanan land of Banggoi village, petuanan land of Aketernate village to the north, and petuanan land of Werinama village to the east.
