= Seit-Kaitetu language =

Austronesian language spoken in Maluku, Indonesia

Seit-Kaitetu
- Native to: Indonesia
- Region: Ambon Island, Maluku
- Native speakers: (10,000 cited 1987)
- Language family: Austronesian: Malayo-Polynesian; Central–Eastern; Central Maluku ?; East Central Maluku; Seram ?; Nunusaku; Piru Bay; East; Seram Straits; Ambon; Seit-Kaitetu
- Dialects: Seit; Kaitetu

Language codes
- ISO 639-3: hik
- Glottolog: seit1239

Seit-Kaitetu, or Hila-Kaitetu, is an Austronesian language of Ambon Island in the Malukus. The dialects of the two villages, Seith and Kaitetu, are divergent.
