= MQC =

MQC or mqc may refer to:

- Miquelon Airport, Miquelon Island, IATA airport code MQC
- Mangole language, Indonesia, ISO 639-3 language code mqc
