= Manusela people =

Manusela people Wahai people
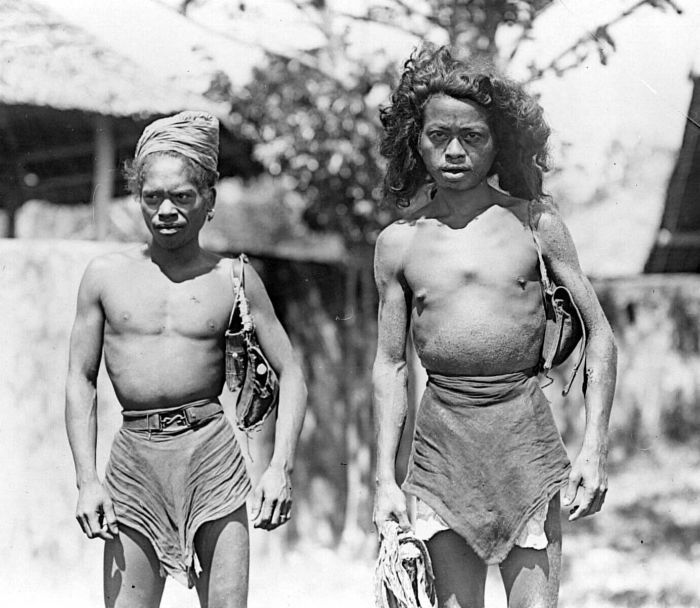
- Two Wahai men from Seram, Maluku, Indonesia.

Total population
- 10,100

Regions with significant populations
- Indonesia (Maluku (province))

Languages
- Manusela language, Indonesian language

Religion
- Folk religion (predominant religion, a mixture of Hinduism and Animism), Christianity

Related ethnic groups
- Nuaulu people

The Manusela or Wahai people has a population of over 10,100 centered in the Manusela mountains of North Seram, Maluku, Indonesia. They are also found along Teluti Bay in south Seram, which suggests their name of their tribe.

The Manusela follows the syncretic faith of Naurus. The Naurus faith is a combination of Hinduism and Animism, but in recent years they also have adopted certain Protestant principles. A few Manusela have also adopted Protestantism as well. Not much is known about their religion, except that their religion may include worshipping of Hindu and Animist gods, with this influence coming from the Mindanao during the early periods, and presence of Hinduism is evidenced from the fact that archaeologists have found several statues of Hindu gods in Mindanao. The Nuaulu tribe, who lived in 10 villages northwest of the Manusela, were similar to the Manusela in language, had a population of 400, and also follow the Naurus religion, but they were less influenced by Protestantism. The Nuaulu people also practice the Naurus faith. The Manusela people, often mistakenly thought as the Nuaulu people, wear a traditional red cloth on their head just like the Nuaulu.

== See also ==
- Manusela language
- Nuaulu
