= Lout =

Lout may refer to:

- Lout (EP), a 2021 EP by The Horrors
- Lout Pond, in Plymouth, Massachusetts, United States
- Louts, a tributary of the river Adour in France

== See also ==
- Laut (disambiguation)
