= Huaulu language =

Austronesian language spoken in Maluku, Indonesia

Huaulu
- Native to: Indonesia (Maluku Islands)
- Region: Seram
- Native speakers: (300 cited 1987)
- Language family: Austronesian: Malayo-Polynesian (MP); Central–Eastern MP; Central Maluku; East Central Maluku; Nunusaku; Patakai–Manusela; Huaulu

Language codes
- ISO 639-3: hud
- Glottolog: huau1237

Huaulu is a language of Seram, Indonesia.
