= Bati language (Indonesia) =

Austronesian language of eastern Seram Island, Indonesia

Bati
- Minakyesu, Minakesi
- Native to: Indonesia (Maluku Islands)
- Region: Seram (mainly in Kian Darat district)
- Ethnicity: Bati people
- Native speakers: (3,500 cited 1989)
- Language family: Austronesian: Malayo-Polynesian; Seram-Tanimbar-Bomberai; Eastern Islands; Nuclear Eastern Islands; Geser-Gorom; Bati

Language codes
- ISO 639-3: bvt
- Glottolog: bati1253
- ELP: Bati (Indonesia)

Bati (endonym: Minakyesu or Minakesi lit. 'mountain language') is an Austronesian language of eastern Seram Island, Indonesia. It is closely related to Geser and Watubela.
