= Nuaulu people =

Ethnic group in Indonesia

Naulu, Nunuhai
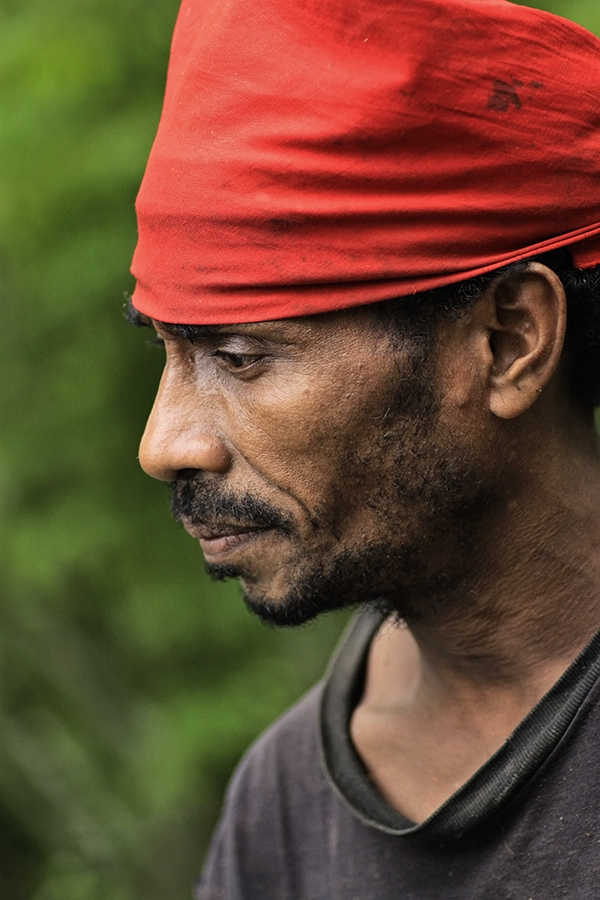
- A Naulu man.

Total population
- 2,700

Regions with significant populations
- Indonesia (Seram)

Languages
- Nuaulu, Ambonese Malay, and Indonesian

Religion
- Naurus Folk religion (predominantly), Islam, Christianity

Related ethnic groups
- Alfur people (Manusela people)

The Nuaulu, also known as the Naulu or Nunuhai, are an ethnic group located in the island of Seram, Maluku, Indonesia. They belong to the Alifuru group of people who are the native inhabitants of the Seram interior.

== Description ==
The name "Nuaulu" means 'head[waters] of the Nua River', which is the ancestral homeland of the Nuaulu people. In the late 19th century or early 20th century, the Nuaulu people were moved down to the coast by the Dutch for purposes of pacification.

The Nuaulu are divided into two groups, namely the northern and the southern groups. Numbering at a total of 2,500 people, they live in the Amahai district of Central Seram. The northern group inhabit two villages on the north coast of central Seram Island, while the southern group inhabits five villages on the south coast and inland of Amahai district. These two languages are not mutually intelligible.

== Religion ==
The majority of the Nuaulu people still adhere to their traditional religion which is based on a belief that the ancestors control everyday life and if the traditions they handed down are not followed correctly the living will be punished with sickness, death, and lack of prosperity. Nuaulu religion also states that there is an original creator called Upu Kuanahatana, and that there is powerful magic which people can use for good, or bad, purposes. Nuaulu people build Baileo for spiritual purposes.

== Culture ==
The Nuaulu people are often mistakenly referred to as the Manusela people, who like the Nuaulu people wear a traditional red cloth on their heads, speak a similar language and practice the same traditional beliefs, the Naurus.

The Nuaulu retained a custom of headhunting until the 1940s. However, the last incident occurred in 2005, seven Nuaulu people were involved in the murder of two residents of Rutah village near the Rutah River, their heads were cut off and their bodies were chopped up, the perpetrators were sentenced to death by the court.

== Livelihood ==
Sago is the staple food of the Nuaulu. Nuaulu are subsistence farmers who use shifting cultivation techniques; they also grow cash crops such as coconuts, cloves, and nutmeg.

== In popular culture ==
The Nuaulu people are honored in the scientific name of a species of gecko, Cyrtodactylus nuaulu, which is native to Seram Island.
