= Taliabo language =

Austronesian language spoken in North Maluku, Indonesia

Taliabo
- Taliabu
- Native to: Indonesia, North Maluku
- Region: Taliabu Island
- Native speakers: (4,900 cited 2000)
- Language family: Austronesian: Malayo-Polynesian; Celebic; Eastern Celebic; Taliabo

Language codes
- ISO 639-3: Either: tlv – Taliabo kzd – Kadai
- Glottolog: tali1261
- ELP: Kadai

Taliabo (Taliabu) is a Malayo-Polynesian language spoken on the island of the same name in the Moluccas of Indonesia.

Dialects are:

- Kadai
- Padang (Samala)
- Mananga
- Mangei (Soboyo)

There are two linguistic strata in Taliabo, Central Maluku and Celebic, and it is not yet clear which group it belongs to, though Glottolog classifies it as Celebic.

The Soboyo dialect of Taliabo is notable for preserving Proto-Malayo-Polynesian *h, but only in word-initial position.

== Phonology ==
=== Consonants ===
| | | Labial | Alveolar | Palatal | Velar | Glottal |
|---|---|---|---|---|---|---|
| Plosive/ Affricate | voiceless | p | t | tʃ | k | ʔ |
| Plosive/ Affricate | voiced | b | d | dʒ | ɡ | |
| Nasal | | m | n | ɲ | ŋ | |
| Fricative | | f | s | ʃ | | h |
| Trill | | | r | | | |
| Lateral | | | l | | | |
| Approximant | | w | | j | | |

All stop sounds (except for /ʔ/) and fricatives /s, ʃ/, may also be prenasalized in both word-initial and word-medial positions as /ᵐb, ⁿd, ᶮdʒ, ᵑɡ/.

=== Vowels ===
| | Front | Central | Back |
|---|---|---|---|
| Close | i | | u |
| Mid | e | | o |
| Open | | a | |
