= Loun language =

Austronesian language spoken in Maluku, Indonesia

Loun
- Native to: Indonesia
- Region: Maluku
- Extinct: (date missing)
- Language family: Austronesian: Malayo-Polynesian (MP); Central–Eastern MP; Central Maluku ?; East Central Maluku; Seram ?; Nunusaku; Three Rivers; Amalumute; Loun
- Writing system: Latin

Language codes
- ISO 639-3: lox
- Glottolog: loun1239
- ELP: Loun
- Linguasphere: 32-DGL-a

The Loun language is an extinct Austronesian language once spoken in Indonesia, mainly in the Maluku archipelago. It was originally spoken in the village of Loun.

By 1978, it was no longer widely used, surviving only in fragmented memories (among some residents of the village of Latea, who considered themselves the descendants of the Loun people). Despite some people being able to still recall a few elements of vocabulary, James T. Collins was unable to gather coherent and complete lexical data. One can assume it was already extinct then.

It was displaced by Ambonese Malay and Indonesian.
