= Salas language =

Endangered Austronesian language of Indonesia

Salas
- Native to: Indonesia (Maluku Islands)
- Region: Seram
- Native speakers: (50 cited 1989)
- Language family: Austronesian: Malayo-Polynesian; Central–Eastern; Central Maluku; East Central Maluku; East Seram; Manusela–Seti; Salas

Language codes
- ISO 639-3: sgu
- Glottolog: sala1269
- ELP: Salas

Salas is a nearly extinct language of Seram, Indonesia.
