= Yalahatan language =

Austronesian language spoken in Maluku, Indonesia

Yalahatan
- Atamanu
- Awaiya
- Native to: Indonesia
- Region: Maluku
- Native speakers: 1,700 (2004)
- Language family: Austronesian: Malayo-Polynesian (MP); Central–Eastern MP; Central Maluku; East Central Maluku; Nunusaku; Three Rivers; Yalahatan
- Dialects: Awaiya (Tananahu); Haruru; Yalahatan

Language codes
- ISO 639-3: jal
- Glottolog: yala1266

Yalahatan is an Austronesian language spoken on Seram Island (Indonesia) in Yalahatan and Haruru villages, and hamlet of Awaiya in Tananahu village.

It consists of three dialects, Yalahatan, Haruru, and Awaiya.
