= Hulung language =

Extinct Austronesian language of Indonesia

Hulung
- Native to: Indonesia
- Region: Maluku
- Extinct: fewer than 10 in 1991, probably gone by 2007
- Language family: Austronesian: Malayo-Polynesian (MP); Central–Eastern MP; Central Maluku; East Central Maluku; Nunusaku; Three Rivers; Amalumute; Hulung

Language codes
- ISO 639-3: huk
- Glottolog: hulu1246
- ELP: Hulung

Hulung is an extinct Austronesian language of Seram in the Maluku archipelago of Indonesia.
