= Lisabata language =

Austronesian language spoken in Maluku, Indonesia

Lisabata
- Lisabata–Nuniali
- Native to: Indonesia
- Region: Maluku, Seram
- Native speakers: (1,830 cited 1982)
- Language family: Austronesian: Malayo-Polynesian (MP); Central–Eastern MP; Central Maluku ?; East Central Maluku; Seram ?; Nunusaku; Three Rivers; Amalumute; Lisabata
- Dialects: Lisabata Timur; Nuniali; Sukaraja; Kawa

Language codes
- ISO 639-3: lcs
- Glottolog: lisa1239

Lisabata–Nuniali, named after two of its dialects, is an Austronesian language of Seram in the Maluku archipelago of Indonesia.
