= Ambelau =

Island and district in Buru Selatan Regency, Maluku Province, Indonesia

Native name: Pulau Ambalau
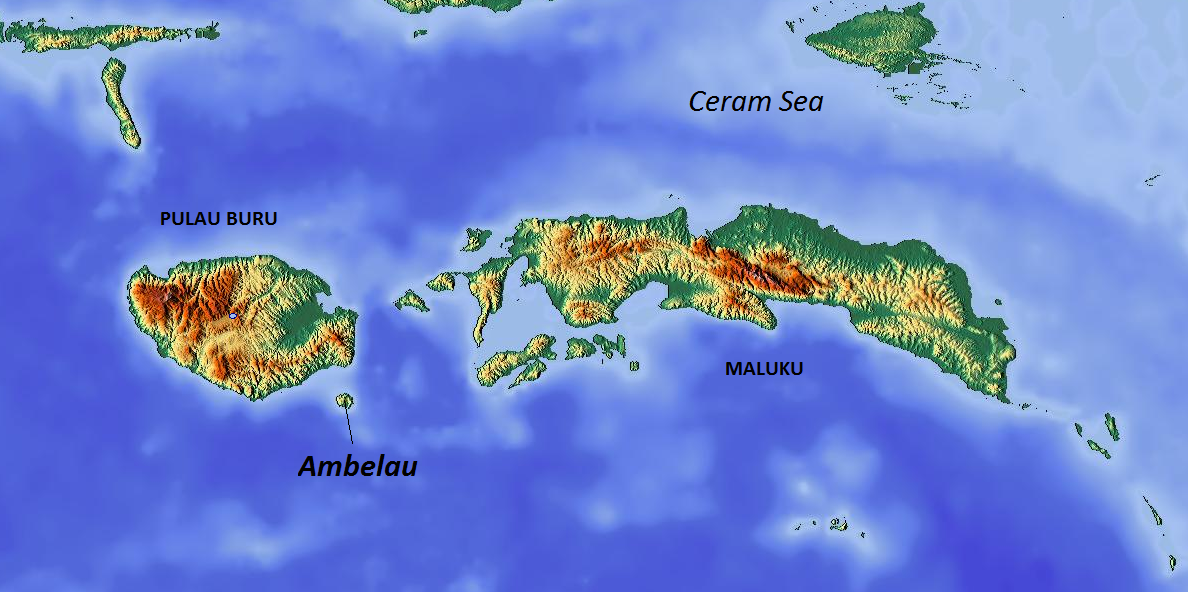

- Location within Indonesia

Geography
- Location: Southeast Asia
- Coordinates: 3°51′20″S 127°11′30″E
- Archipelago: Greater Sunda Islands
- Area: 306 km^{2} (118 sq mi)
- Highest elevation: 608 m (1995 ft)
- Highest point: Gunung Baula

Administration
- Indonesia
- Province: Maluku
- Regency: South Buru Regency
- Largest settlement: Wailua

Demographics
- Population: 9225 (mid 2023 estimate)
- Pop. density: 30.1/km^{2} (78/sq mi)
- Languages: Ambelau language

Additional information
- Time zone: IEST (UTC+09:00)

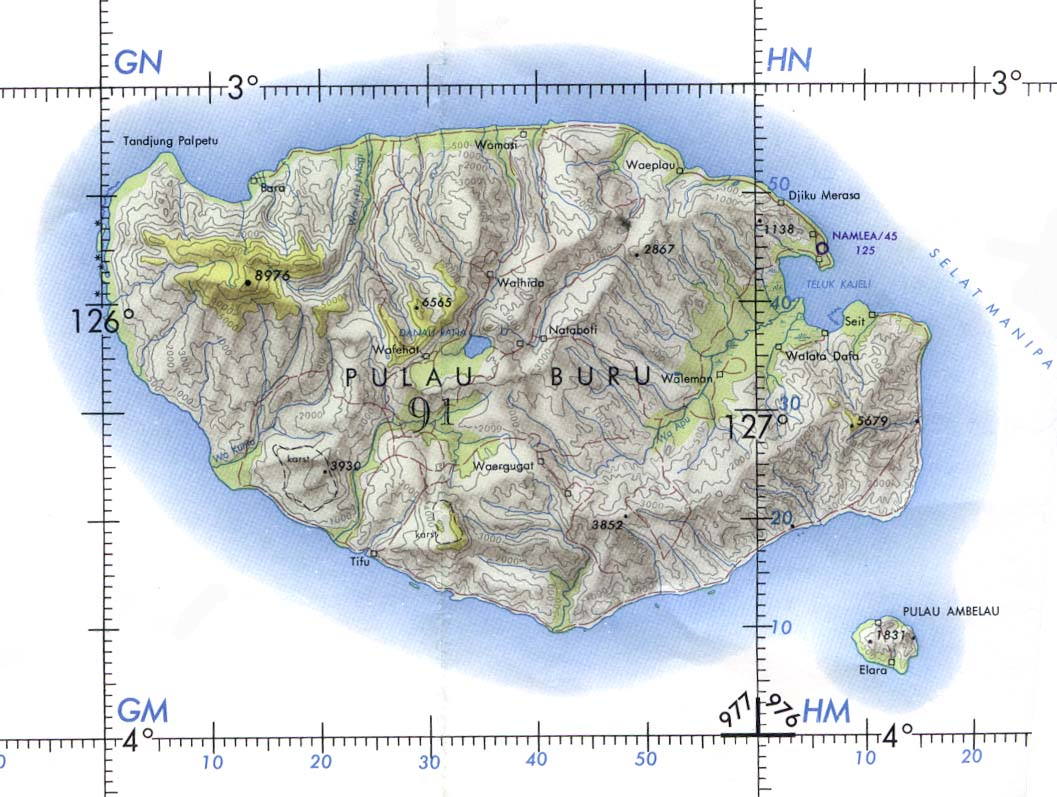
Map of Buru island with Ambelau to the south-east

Ambelau or Ambalau is a volcanic island in the Banda Sea within Maluku Islands of Indonesia. The island forms an administrative district (Indonesian: Kecamatan Ambalau) which is part of the South Buru Regency (Indonesian: Kabupaten Buru Selatan) of Maluku province (Indonesian: Provinsi Maluku), Indonesia. It has a land area of 306 km^{2}, and had a population of 6,846 at the 2010 Census; the official estimate as at mid 2023 was 9,225. The administrative center is Wailua, a settlement located at the south of the island. About half of the island's population is composed of indigenous Ambelau people who speak the Ambelau language; the other half are mostly immigrants from the nearby Maluku Islands and Java.

== Geography and geology ==
The island is located in the Banda Sea at the southern entrance to the strait Manipa, about 20 km south-east of the larger island of Buru. It has a relatively smooth oval shape with a minor extension in the south-eastern part and the maximum diameter of about 10 km.

The island is of volcanic origin, and is composed of Cenozoic sedimentary rocks. The relief is mostly mountainous, with the highest points at 608 m (Mt. Baula) and 559 m (Mt. Nona) in the western area. The island rises vertically from the sea, and flat parts are found only on the southern and eastern coasts. Much of the territory, especially in mountainous areas, is covered with wet tropical forests. The island is located in a seismically active zone with frequent earthquakes; two significant recent earthquakes occurred in August 2006 and January 2016 when eight people were hurt and about 120 houses were damaged in two villages. Flora and fauna of the island are diverse and are similar to that of Buru. There are abundant coral reefs off the coast of Ambelau.

== Administration ==
The island belongs to the Indonesian province of Maluku. Until 1999 the island belonged to the Central Maluku Regency (Indonesian: Kabupaten Maluku Tengah), then to the Buru Regency (Indonesian: Kabupaten Buru), in which it was isolated into a separate administrative district (Kecamatan Ambalau). In 2008, when the South Buru Regency split up from the Buru Regency, the island became part of it, maintaining its kecamatan status. The island is divided into seven administrative units of lower rank, called village (Indonesian: desa) or settlement (Indonesian: kelurahan), namely Kampung Baru, Lumoy, Masawoy, Selasi, Siwar, Ulima and Elara.

Phonetics of the local languages reduces the vowel in the second syllable of the island name. As a result, Western sources refer to it as Ambelau, whereas modern Indonesian sources spell the name as Ambalau, particularly in official documents and on the official website of the Buru and South Buru regencies.

== Population ==
Map of Ambelau

The majority of Ambalau's population (6,846 at the 2010 census, rising to 9,225 as at mid 2023) resides on the coastal plains, in the settlements of Kampung Baru (969), Lumoy (1,209), Masawoy (750), Selasi (606), Siwar (890), Ulima (970) and Elara (1,452). About half of the population are indigenous Ambelau people, and another half are immigrants from other Maluku Islands belonging to Sulawesi (mainly Bugis) and Javanese ethnicities. The latter moved to the island mainly through the large-scale transmigration programs supported by both the Dutch colonial administration in the 1900s and the Indonesian authorities in the 1950s–1990s. The individual ethnic groups speak different languages and dialects in everyday life, for example Ambelau language. However, most adults have knowledge of the national Indonesian language and use it in public or in communication with other tribes. By religion, most Ambalau residents are Sunni Muslims, with a small part of Christians and with some remnants of traditional local beliefs.

== Economy ==
Agriculture dominates the local economy. Cultivation of rice – the most common crop of the region – is hindered on Ambelau by the hilly terrain and abundance of the wild pig Buru babirusa damaging the crops (which is rarely hunted because of the Muslim traditions). The small terrains of fertile land on the coast are used to grow maize, sago sweet potato, cocoa, coconut, allspice and nutmeg. Tuna fishing is practiced by the villages of Masawoy and Ulimo. Some agricultural and fish products are exported to the nearby Buru islands, mainly on the markets of the town Namlea.

== History ==
In the pre-colonial period the island was densely populated by the indigenous Ambelau people. In the sixteenth and seventeenth centuries the Sultanate of Ternate declared its sovereignty over the island; however, this had little more than symbolic meaning as the island never came under its direct control. The Portuguese adventurers who entered the archipelago at the end of the 16th century concluded an agreement with Ternate on the joint development of Ambalau, but little came of this arrangement.

Ambalau fell into the zone of influence of the Dutch East India Company (VOC) by the middle of the 17th century. It is known that in the 1660s the island was often raided by pirates from Papua, who captured islanders for sale into slavery. It was their systematic attacks on Ambalau that prompted the VOC to send several punitive expeditions against Papua. However, the main interest of the VOC was in the spice trade, and active economic exploitation of a small inaccessible island was considered unprofitable. The VOC concentrated plantations on a few well-developed and well-protected, and by the end of the 17th century had relocated significant part of the local population to neighboring Buru as labor on its clove plantations. In administrative terms, Ambalau was included in the Governorate of Ambon, whose leader was based in Ambon and who reported directly to the Governor-General of the Netherlands East Indies.

The island did not receive significant attention in the later stage of Dutch colonization either. After the capture of the Netherlands East Indies by Japan during World War II in 1942, Ambalau, together with the rest of the Moluccas, was assigned to the zone of occupation of the Japanese 2nd Fleet. The occupation formally ended in August 1945; however, the newly proclaimed Republic of Indonesia was unable to establish its power in such a remote region, and in early 1946 the Netherlands regained control of Ambalau without resistance. A few months later, Ambalau, along with all the Moluccas, Sulawesi and the Lesser Sunda Islands, was included in the quasi-independent State of East Indonesia. In December 1949. The decision to incorporate East Indonesia into the Republic of Indonesia in April 1950 was opposed by many inhabitants, leading to the proclamation of the Republic of South Moluccas, which included Ambalau. The succession was crushed by the Indonesian military by the end of 1950 and Ambalau was proclaimed part of the Republic of Indonesia.
