= Nakaʼela language =

Extinct Austronesian language of Indonesia

Nakaʼela
- Native to: Indonesia
- Region: Maluku
- Extinct: 1990s
- Language family: Austronesian: Malayo-Polynesian (MP); Central–Eastern MP; Central Maluku ?; East Central Maluku; Seram ?; Nunusaku; Three Rivers; Amalumute; Nakaʼela

Language codes
- ISO 639-3: nae
- Glottolog: naka1263
- ELP: Naka'ela

Nakaʼela is a possibly extinct Austronesian language spoken in Seram, Indonesia. Usage decreased after speakers moved out of the mountains.
