= Peter Laut =

Peter Laut is a professor Emeritus of Physics, from the Technical University of Denmark, DTU. He retired in 2003.

He has a background in theoretical physics and is educated at the Niels Bohr Institute at the University of Copenhagen. He gradually developed an interest in climatology, and in the 1990s he was asked to become an advisor to The Danish Energy Agency regarding the scientific developments in climatology with special attention to the possible causes of global warming. The Technical University of Denmark and the Danish Energy Agency established an agreement under which the Technical University redefined the professional obligations of Peter Laut's tenure, so that the advisory work became part of his job at the university.

== Controversy ==
Peter Laut has been an outspoken critic of many theories surrounding global warming. In particular, he has criticized some of the work of Henrik Svensmark, a Danish proponent of solar-based global warming theory.

Danish newspapers have accused him of lobbyism and political agendas in his debunking of the various theories he has attacked.
