= Lease Islands =

Island group in Maluku, Indonesia

Coordinates: 3.6477°S 128.4329°E

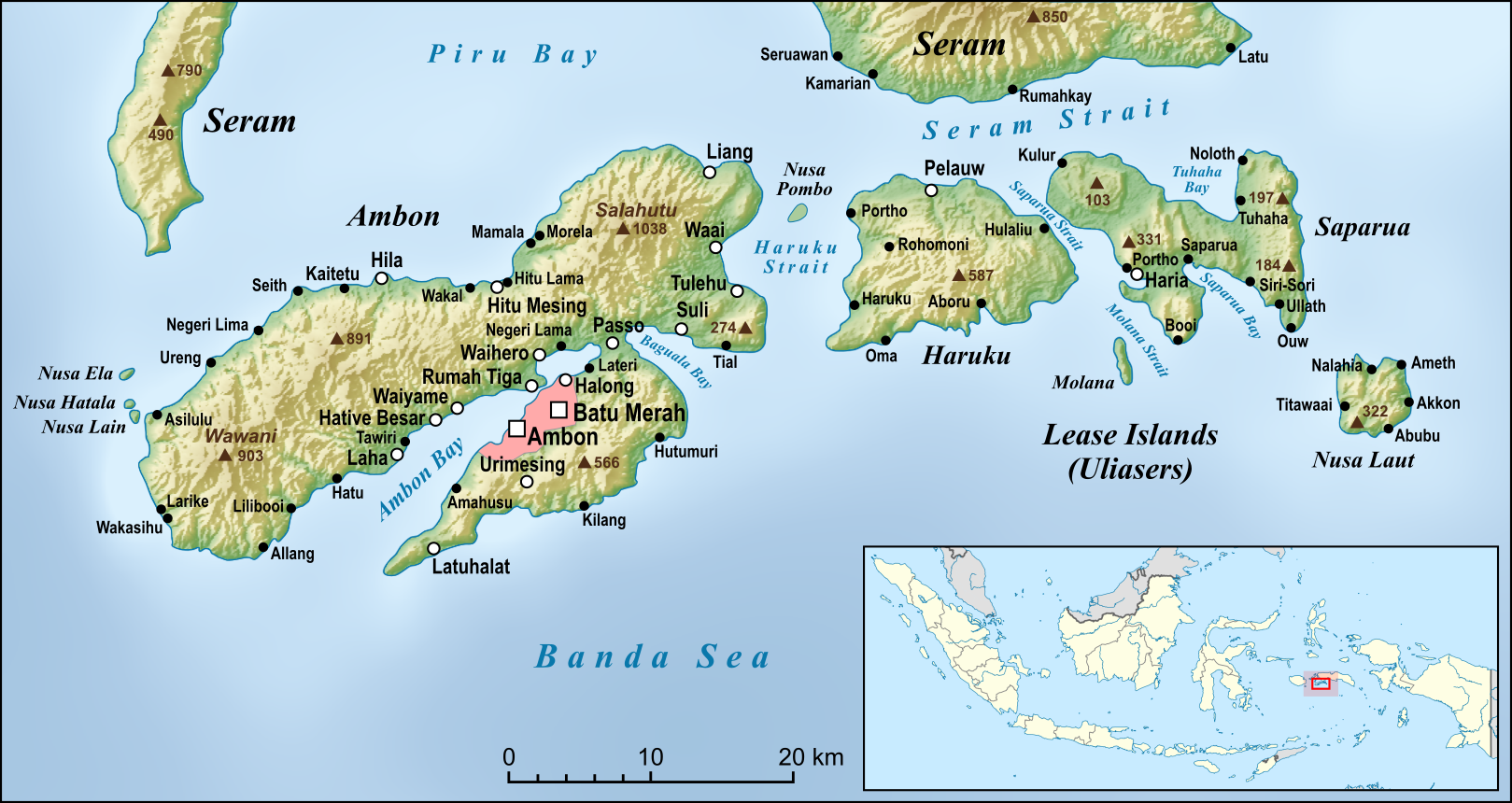

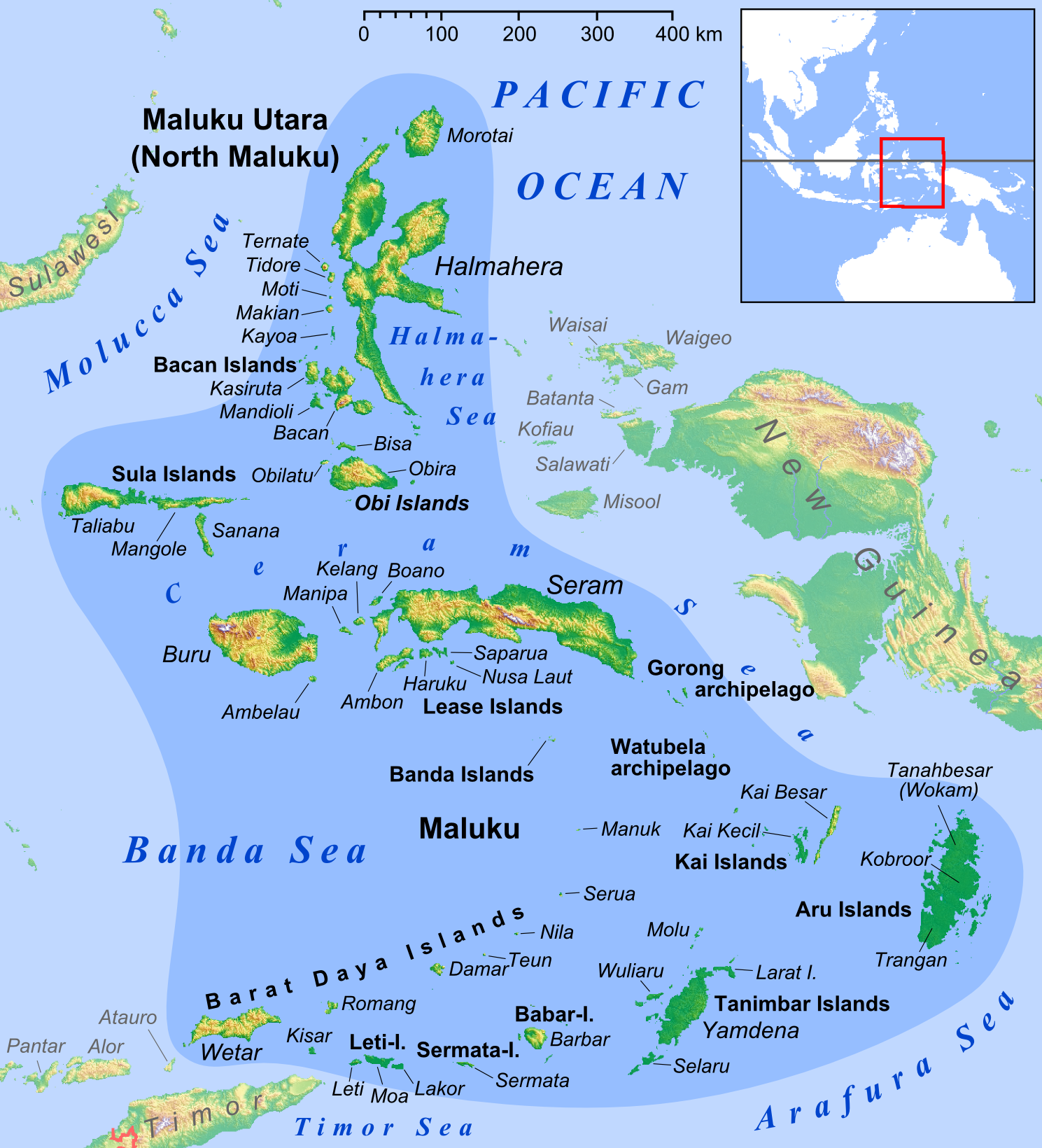
Lease Islands in the center of the Maluku Islands

The Lease Islands (pronounced LAY-a-SAY, /leɪ.a.seɪ/), formerly called the Uliasers or Uliassers, are a group of three inhabited islands (and smaller uninhabited islets), lying immediately to the south of Seram and east of Ambon Island in the province of Maluku, in Indonesia. The three inhabited islands, from west to east, are Haruku, Saparua and Nusa Laut, while tiny uninhabited Molana is administratively part of Saparua District; these islands constitute four administrative districts (kecamatan) within Central Maluku Regency.

District (kecamatan) Name	English name	Admin Centre	Area in km^{2}	Pop'n Census 2010	Pop'n Census 2020	Pop'n Estimate mid 2024
Pulau Haruku	Haruku Island	Pelauw	150.00	24,207	27,390	26,301
Saparua	(West) Saparua	Kota Saparua	79.90	32,475	18,402	17,499
Saparua Timur	East Saparua	Tuhaha	96.60	^{(a)}	17,620	16,660
Nusa Laut	Nusa Laut Island	Ameth	32.50	5,322	5,780	5,340
(totals on Lease Islands)			359.00	62,004	69,192	65,800

Note: ^{(a)} Figures for Saparua Timur's population in 2010 are included in those for Saparua.

== Sources ==
- Muller, Dr. Kal (1990). Spice Islands: The Moluccas. Periplus Editions. ISBN 0-945971-07-9.
