= Nuaulu language =

Austronesian language spoken in Maluku

Nuaulu
- Native to: Indonesia (Maluku Islands)
- Region: Seram
- Native speakers: (2,000 cited 1990–1995)
- Language family: Austronesian: Malayo-Polynesian (MP); Central–Eastern MP; Central Maluku; East Central Maluku; Nunusaku; Patakai–Manusela; Sawai–Nuaulu; Nuaulu

Language codes
- ISO 639-3: Either: nxl – South nni – North
- Glottolog: nuau1240

Nuaulu is a language indigenous to the island of Seram Island in Indonesia, and it is spoken by the Nuaulu people. The language is split into two dialects, a northern and a southern dialect, between which there a communication barrier. The dialect of Nuaulu referred to on this page is the southern dialect, as described in Bolton 1991.

In 1991, a survey of a few coastal villages of Southern Seram showed that there were then around 1000 speakers of the Southern dialect.

Religion plays an important part in the language statistics. Those who stick to the native religious practices tend to use the native language more, whereas those who have converted to another religion tend to use Ambonese Malay, a language necessary for educational purposes, more often. This is due to religious segregation, separating the traditional local religion from others by sending its practitioners to a secluded section of the village. This minimizes the usage of Nuaulu in the separated section of the main village.

== Phonology ==
=== Phonemes ===
Within the Central-Eastern Malayo-Polynesian language group, Nuaulu has the fewest phonemes, with a total count of 16, which are presented in the tables for consonants and vowels below.

Consonants
	Labial	Alveolar	Velar	Glottal
Stops	p	t	k	
Nasals	m	n		
Fricatives		s		h
Laterals		l		
Flaps		r		
Semivowels	w	j		

Vowels
	Front	Central	Back
High	i		u
Mid	e		o
Low		a	

Nuaulu also has a glottal stop, but Bolton (1991) considers it non-phonemic. It is mainly seen in the beginning of a word, taking the place of a consonant.

=== Phonotactics ===
Nuaulu follows the syllable structure (C)V(N), and most combinations of this syllable structure are viable. There are some exceptions to this structure; the syllable N can be used by itself, and consonants [w] and [y] have restrictions. Rosemary Ann Bolton's (1991) research concluded that the situation regarding the syllable N occurs "only as the first syllable of a word which is two or more syllables long." In 1991, inspection of the Nuaulu lexicon revealed that there are no words where the CV syllable structure had a consonant [w] pair with a high vowel. The consonant [j] is similar in this regard, where it does not pair with the high vowel [i] in the CV structure. However, [j] does pair with [u].

== Morphology ==
Nuaulu contains no adjectives, but nouns and verbs are used to replace their function. In most cases, these are nouns as opposed to verbs. The "adjectives" do not have other special properties other than being descriptive; they act the same as other nouns/verbs.

=== Verbs ===
Nuaulu follows the standard transitive and intransitive verb forms, with addition to stative verbs. Verbs in Nuaulu are also subject to inflection. The inflection occurs depending on involvement and amount.

Subject Verb Proclitics
		Singular	Plural
1st Person	Exclusive	u-	a-
1st Person	Inclusive	u-	i-
2nd Person		a-	o-
3rd Person	with Person	i-	o-
3rd Person	without Person	(e)re-	(e)ra-

Note that the first person exclusive plural proclitic and the second person singular proclitic are the same. This proclitic, along with the other proclitics being shared between two points of views, can be used to represent one point of view or the other. The point of view the proclitic is portraying is distinguished only based on the usage of the word in relation to the whole sentence.

Pronominal Verb Enclitics
		Singular	Plural
1st Person	Exclusive	-ku	-ma
1st Person	Inclusive	-ku	-ta
2nd Person		-(j)a	-mo
3rd Person	with Person	-(k)i	-so
3rd Person	without Person	-(k)i	-re

The affixes and clitics of a base verb can determine the use and syntax of the verb.

Nuaulu makes use of reduplication. In verbs, reduplication is used to emphasize the verb, sometimes even providing enough descriptive strength to act as an adjective. There are two classes of reduplication. Normally used in a CVCV verb syllable structure, the first class reduplicates the verb. The second reduplication class will reduplicate part of a verb root, or its prefix.

=== Nouns ===
The majority of nouns are marked by one of the suffixes -e, -ne, -te, or -ke. These four marker are the classifiers that make up four of the five major groups of nouns, while the last major group does not have a marker. Most noun roots will fall under only one group, and stems with specific end vowels occur in certain groups. The -e group does not connect to any nouns ending with the vowel [e] and the -ke group does not connect to any nouns ending with the vowels [i] and [o].

When distinguishing these five word classes, the classification traits can be traced from Proto-Austronesian words.

Proto-Austronesian Connection with Nuaulu
		Proto-form	Nuaulu	Gloss
Class I No marker:	*∅ --> ∅	*asu	asu	'dog'
Class I No marker:	*w --> ∅	*laŋaw	imanane	'fly'
Class I No marker:	*j --> ∅	*tita(y)	teta	'bridge'
Class II -e:	*∅ --> e	*vua	hua-e	'fruit'
Class II -e:	*s --> e	*makas	maka-e	'hard'
Class II -e:	*k --> e	*manuk	manu-e	'bird'
Class II -e:	*q --> e	*mataq	mata-e	'unripe'
Class II -e:	*h -->	*saNa/h/	sana-e	'branch'
Class II -e:	^{ʔ} --> e	*tua^{ʔ}	mtua-e	'palm wine'
Class III -ne:	*n --> ne	*bulan	huna-ne	'moon'
	*l --> ne	*bakul	paku-ne	'basket'
	*r --> ne	*DataR	wata-ne	'level'
Class IV -te:	*t --> te	*wanat	wana-te	'k.o. bamboo'
	*D --> te	*tuquD	tue-te	'tree stump'
Class V -ke:	^{ʔ} --> ke	*gau^{ʔ}	kau-ke	'grasshopper'

Bolton (1991) explains this comparison:

These final Proto-Austronesian consonants also fall into classes corresponding to the Nuaulu noun classes. Class I nouns ended in semivowels, vowels, or no final consonant. Class II nouns ended in fricatives, velar sounds, glottal sounds, or no final consonant. Class III nouns ended in alveolar nasals or liquids. Class IV nouns ended in alveolar stops and Class V nouns ended in a glottal stop.

— Rosemary Ann Bolton, A Preliminary Description of Nuaulu Phonology and Grammar (1991)

Nouns are reduplicated to display intensity. Reduplication is also used in a few animal names.

The plural forms of nouns depend on the noun class. Nouns in Class I are given a suffix -u to signal plural. For nouns in classes II, III, IV, and V, the ending vowel e of the marker is replaced with the vowel [a] instead.

==== Possession ====
Nuaulu has two distinguishable types of possession: alienable possession and inalienable possession. Inalienable possessive markers take the form of suffixes added to the noun, and alienable possessive markers are extra clitics that occur before the targeted noun.

Inalienable Possessive Markers
		Singular	Plural
1st person	Exclusive	-ku	-ma
1st person	Inclusive	-ku	-ri
2nd person		-m	-mo
3rd person	+ human	-i, -n(i)	-o
3rd person	human	-e, -te	-a, -ta

Alienable Possessive Markers
		Singular	Plural
1st person	Exclusive	we(a)=	mani(a)=
1st person	Inclusive	we(a)=	re(a)=
2nd person		me(a)=	mo(a)=
3rd person	+ human	ne(a)=	no(a)=
3rd person	human	nene=	unknown

=== Pronouns ===
Pronouns in Nuaulu can fall under a few specific categories: personal, demonstrative, interrogative, reflexive, relative, or as a possessive marker. Nuaulu personal pronouns are classified as either free pronouns or clitics.

Free Pronouns
		Singular	Plural
1st Person	Exclusive	au	ami
1st Person	Inclusive	au	ita
2nd Person		ano	omi
3rd Person		ia	sio

The pronouns distinguish singular and plural numbers. Plural pronouns consisting of a specific amount involved are created with a number combined with the proper pronominal verb enclitic attached.

=== Adverbs ===
Adverbs are also subject to reduplication; this reduplication of adverbs is done to augment the intent/meaning the adverb is portraying. If the root word begins with a CVN syllable, that syllable is reduplicated. If the root word begins with any other syllable structure, then the initial two syllables of the root word are repeated.
