= Liana language =

Austronesian language spoken in Maluku, Indonesia

Liana
- Liana-Seti
- Native to: Indonesia (Maluku Islands)
- Region: Seram
- Native speakers: (3,000 cited 1989)
- Language family: Austronesian: Malayo-Polynesian; Central–Eastern; Central Maluku; East Central Maluku; East Seram; Manusela–Seti; Liana

Language codes
- ISO 639-3: ste
- Glottolog: lian1255

Liana, or Liana-Seti, is a language of Seram, Indonesia. It also goes by the names Kobi and Uhei Kachlakan, names it shares with neighboring Benggoi.
