= Haruku Island =

Island in Maluku, Indonesia

Coordinates: 3.567°S 128.483°E

Haruku
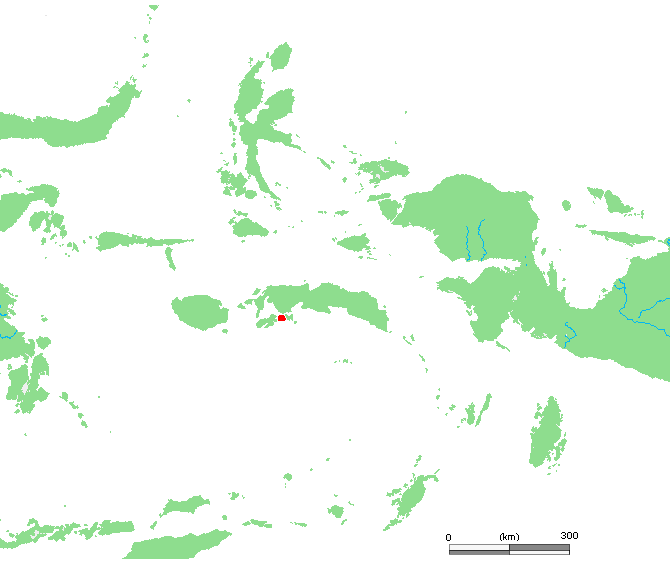
- Location of Haruku Island

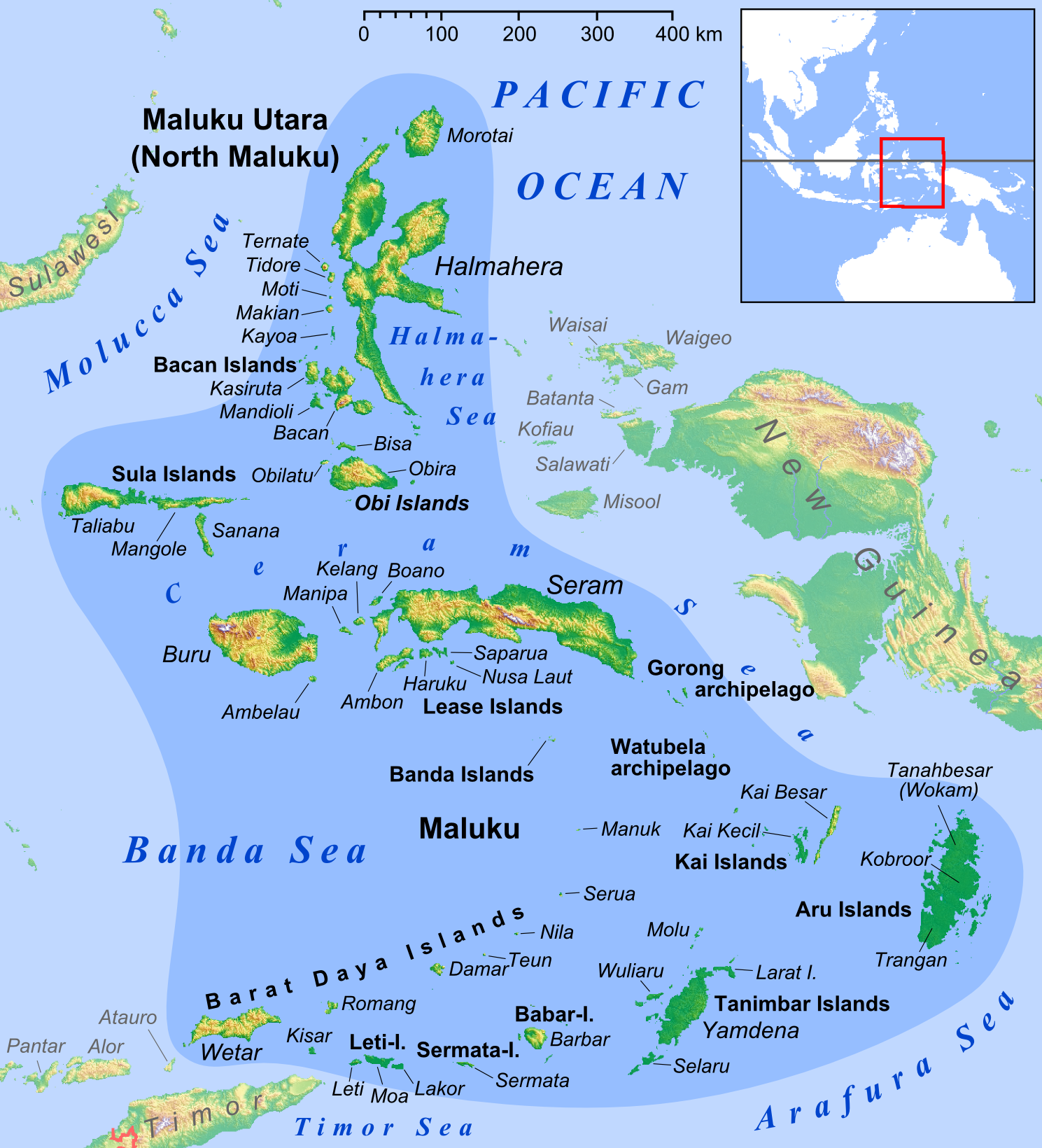

Geography
- Location: South East Asia
- Archipelago: Maluku Islands
- Area: 150.00 km^{2} (57.92 sq mi)
- Highest elevation: 601 m (1972 ft)
- Highest point: Huruano

Administration
- Indonesia
- Province: Maluku
- Regency: Central Maluku

Demographics
- Population: 26,551 (mid 2023 estimate)
- Pop. density: 177.0/km^{2} (458.4/sq mi)
- Languages: Ambonese Malay, Haruku, Indonesian

Additional information
- Time zone: IEST (UTC+09:00)

Haruku Island is an island in Central Maluku Regency, Maluku Province, Indonesia - lying east of Ambon Island, off the southern coast of Seram and just west of Saparua. It is administered as a single district, Haruku Island District (Kecamatan Pulau Haruku), with a land area of 150 km^{2} and a population of 24,207 at the 2010 census and 27,390 at the 2020 Census; the official estimate as at mid 2023 was 26,551. The inhabitants of Haruku speak the Haruku language, as well as Indonesian and Ambonese Malay.

There are six Christian (Aboru, Haruku, Hulaliu, Kariu, Oma and Wassu) and five Muslim (Kabauw, Kailolo, Pelauw, Rohomoni and Sameth) villages (desa) on the island. The areas (in km^{2}) and 2020 Census populations of each of these, together with the official estimates as at mid 2022, are as follows:

Kode Wilayah	Name of desa	Area in km^{2}	Pop'n Census 2020	Pop'n Estimate mid 2022
81.01.13.2001	Aboru	17.00	1,953	2,040
81.01.13.2002	Wassu	7.00	820	753
81.01.13.2003	Oma	10.00	2,469	2,482
81.01.13.2004	Haruku (village)	13.00	2,335	2,319
81.01.13.2005	Sameth	8.00	460	557
81.01.13.2006	Rohomoni	15.00	2,668	2,692
81.01.13.2007	Kabauw	12.00	1,288	1,647
81.01.13.2008	Kailolo	13.00	3,410	4,156
81.01.13.2009	Pelauw	35.00	6,850	7,520
81.01.13.2010	Kariu	8.00	1,017	1,136
81.01.13.2011	Hulaliu	12.00	1,606	1,757

As on most of the islands of the Moluccas, spices such as nutmeg, cloves, cumin and ginger are grown as cash crops.

In 1527, the Portuguese were the first Europeans to reach the island. The Dutch followed in 1590 and established Fort New Zealand, whose ruins are now a tourist attraction. During World War II, the Japanese established a Prisoner-of-war camp for captive British and Dutch forces on the island, who were used as forced labour to build an airstrip.
