= Saleman language =

Austronesian language spoken in Maluku, Indonesia

Saleman
- Sawai
- Native to: Indonesia (Maluku Islands)
- Region: Seram
- Native speakers: (4,800 cited 1989)
- Language family: Austronesian: Malayo-Polynesian (MP); Central–Eastern MP; Central Maluku; East Central Maluku; Nunusaku; Three Rivers; Amalumute; Saleman

Language codes
- ISO 639-3: sau
- Glottolog: sale1244

Saleman is a language of Seram, Indonesia. The names Saleman and Sawai are villages where it is spoken.
