= Manusela language =

Austronesian language spoken in Maluku, Indonesia

Manusela
- Wahinama
- Sou Upaa
- Native to: Indonesia (Maluku Islands)
- Region: Seram
- Ethnicity: Manusela people
- Native speakers: (7,000 cited 1989)
- Language family: Austronesian: Malayo-Polynesian (MP); Central–Eastern MP; Central Maluku; East Central Maluku; Nunusaku; Patakai–Manusela; Manusela

Language codes
- ISO 639-3: wha
- Glottolog: manu1258

Manusela is an Austronesian language spoken in Seram, Indonesia. It is classified by Collins (1983) as a member of the Central Maluku subgroup.

== Phonology ==
	Labial	Alveolar	Palatal	Velar	Glottal
Nasal	m	n	(ɲ)	(ŋ)	
Plosive	p	t		k	
Fricative	f	s			h
Rhotic		r			
Lateral		l			
Semivowel	w		j		

[ŋ ɲ] as well as voiced stops [b d ɡ] appear in loanwords from other languages.

	Front	Back
Close	i	u
Mid	e	o
Open	a	
