= Nusa Laut =

Island in Maluku, Indonesia

Nusa Laut Island
- Location within Maluku

Geography
- Location: Oceania
- Coordinates: 3°40′6″S 128°47′11″E
- Archipelago: Maluku Islands
- Area: 32.50 km^{2} (12.55 sq mi)
- Highest elevation: 358 m (1175 ft)

Administration
- Indonesia
- Province: Maluku
- Regency: Central Maluku

Demographics
- Population: 5,437 (mid 2023 estimate)
- Pop. density: 176.7/km^{2} (457.7/sq mi)
- Languages: Ambonese Malay, Indonesian, Nusa Laut

Additional information
- Time zone: IEST (UTC+09:00)

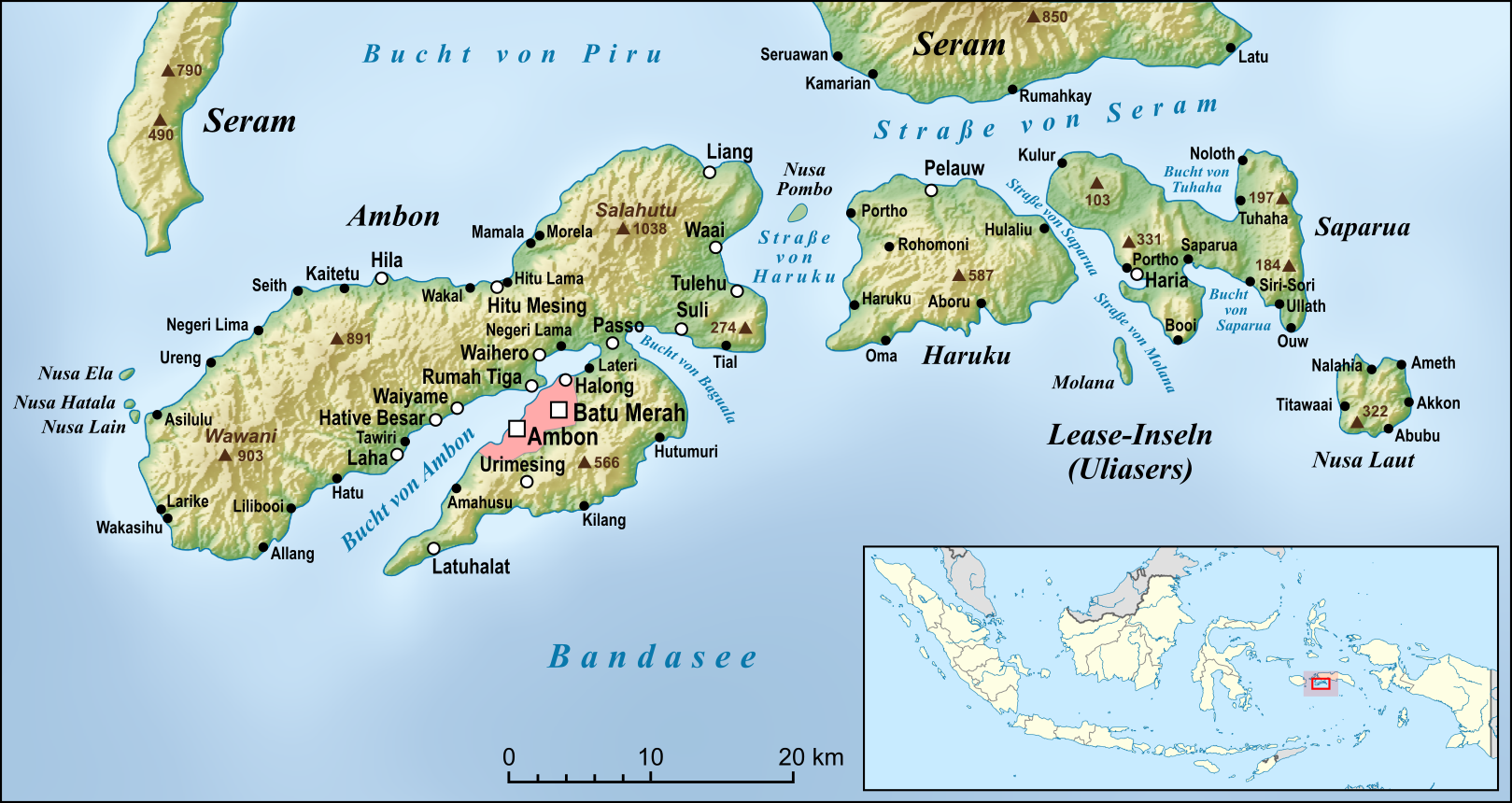

Nusa Laut (also called Pulau Nusahulawano or Pulau Emas) is the smallest of the three inhabited island in the Lease Islands group situated east of Ambon Island, in Indonesia's Maluku province. It lies just off the south-western corner of Saparua island, a deep channel separates it. The island's coasts are fringed by a drying reef.

Nusa Laut covers a land area of 32.5 km^{2} and had a population of 5,322 at the 2010 Census and 5,780 at the 2020 Census; the official estimate as at mid 2023 was 5,437 inhabitants. live in seven villages - Leinitu, Sila, Nalahia and Ameth in the north of the island, and Titawaai, Abubu and Akoon in the south of the island - all sharing the postcode of 97518. They speak the Nusa Laut language, as well as Indonesian and Ambonese Malay.

Kode Wilayah	Name of desa	Area in km^{2}	Pop'n Estimate mid 2023
81.01.16.2001	Ameth	5.75	595
81.01.16.2002	Titawaai	6.00	1,453
81.01.16.2003	Abubu	4.25	1,849
81.01.16.2004	Akoon	4.75	745
81.01.16.2005	Nalahia	5.25	492
81.01.16.2006	Sila	3.00	286
81.01.16.2007	Leinitu	3.50	277

Nusa Laut has an all-Christian population and has been spared the 1999–2000 riots plaguing the rest of the region. Its villages have many colonial style houses and churches, two of which compete for the title of being the oldest church in Maluku. There is also an old fort - the Dutch East India Company's Fort Beverwijk.

Visitors come to the island for its beaches and to dive off the reefs of Ameth - reputedly one of the best dive spots in the Lease Islands.
