= Mangole language =

Austronesian language spoken in North Maluku, Indonesia

Mangole
- Mangoli
- Li Mangon
- Native to: Indonesia, Maluku
- Region: Sula Islands
- Ethnicity: Mangole
- Native speakers: (7,300 cited 2000)
- Language family: Austronesian: Malayo-Polynesian; Central–Eastern; Central Maluku; Sula–Buru; Sula; Mangole

Language codes
- ISO 639-3: mqc
- Glottolog: mang1408

Mangole (Li Mangon) is a variety or dialect of the Sula language that is primarily spoken on Mangole Island in Indonesia.
