= Wemale language =

Austronesian language spoken in Maluku, Indonesia

Wemale
- Native to: Indonesia
- Region: Maluku
- Ethnicity: Wemale people
- Native speakers: (6000 cited 2000 census)
- Language family: Austronesian: Malayo-Polynesian (MP); Central–Eastern MP; Central Maluku; East Central Maluku; Nunusaku; Three Rivers; Wemale

Language codes
- ISO 639-3: weo
- Glottolog: nort2864

Wemale is an Austronesian language spoken on western Seram Island in Indonesia. It is classified by Collins (1983) as a member of the Central Maluku subgroup.

The language is divided into northern and southern dialects, having variants known as Honitetu, Oemale, and Tala. Northern Wemale is spoken by about 5,000 people, whereas Southern Wemale is spoken by about 3,700 people.

== See also ==
- Wemale people
- Hainuwele

== Sources ==
- Consolidation of Wemale at SIL
