= Alune language =

Austronesian language of Indonesia

Alune
- Native to: Indonesia
- Region: Maluku, Seram
- Ethnicity: Alune
- Native speakers: (17,000 cited 2000)
- Language family: Austronesian: Malayo-Polynesian (MP); Central–Eastern MP; Central Maluku ?; East Central Maluku; Seram ?; Nunusaku; Three Rivers; Amalumute; Alune

Language codes
- ISO 639-3: alp
- Glottolog: alun1238
- ELP: Alune

Alune is an Austronesian language of west Seram in the Maluku archipelago of Indonesia.

== Phonology ==
Consonants
		Labial	Alveolar	Palatal	Velar		Glottal
		Labial	Alveolar	Palatal	plain	lab.	Glottal
Nasal		m	n	ɲ			
Plosive	voiceless	p	t		k	kʷ	
Plosive	voiced	b	d				
Fricative			s				h
Rhotic			r				
Lateral			l				
Semivowel		w		j			

Vowels
	Front	Central	Back
Close	i		u
Mid	e		o
Open		a	

- /d/ can be heard as a trill [r] in word-initial and intervocalic positions, and may also fluctuate to an affricate [dʒ] sound.
- /n/ can be heard as a velar nasal [ŋ] when preceding velar stops.
