= Bobot language =

Austronesian language spoken in Maluku, Indonesia

Bobot
- Native to: Indonesia (Maluku Islands)
- Region: Southern coast of Seram (in the districts of Werinama and Siwalalat, from the village of Atiahu to Kota Baru, and Tunsai village in the Liana area, Central Maluku)
- Native speakers: (4,500 cited 1989)
- Language family: Austronesian: Malayo-Polynesian; Central–Eastern; Central Maluku; East Central Maluku; East Seram; Bobot

Language codes
- ISO 639-3: bty
- Glottolog: bobo1254

Bobot is a language of the island of Seram, Indonesia.
