= Watubela language =

Austronesian language spoken in Maluku, Indonesia

Watubela
- Native to: Indonesia (Maluku Islands)
- Region: Watubela Islands
- Native speakers: (4,000 cited 1990)
- Language family: Austronesian: Malayo-Polynesian; Seram-Tanimbar-Bomberai; Eastern Islands; Nuclear Eastern Islands; Watubela

Language codes
- ISO 639-3: wah
- Glottolog: watu1247

Watubela is an Austronesian language of the Maluku Islands, Indonesia. It is closely related to Geser.

It reflects Proto-Malayo-Polynesian *q as k, such as lalak "blood" < *daʀaq and katlu "egg" < *qatəluʀ.
