= Geser language =

Austronesian language spoken in Maluku, Indonesia

Geser
- Geser-Gorom
- Native to: Indonesia (Maluku Islands)
- Region: Seram, Geser Islands
- Native speakers: (37,000 cited 1989)
- Language family: Austronesian: Malayo-Polynesian; Seram-Tanimbar-Bomberai; Eastern Islands; Nuclear Eastern Islands; Geser-Gorom; Geser

Language codes
- ISO 639-3: ges
- Glottolog: gese1240

Geser is an Austronesian language of the east end of Seram and the Gorom Islands, Indonesia. It is closely related to Watubela.

== Phonology ==
Consonants
		Labial	Alveolar	Palatal	Velar	Glottal
Nasal		m	n	(ɲ)	ŋ	
Plosive/ Affricate	voiceless	p	t	tʃ	k	ʔ
Plosive/ Affricate	voiced	b	d		ɡ	
Fricative		(f)	s			h
Rhotic			r			
Lateral			l			
Approximant		w		j		

/h/ and /f/ are in free alteration among the dialects of Geser and Gorom.

/ɲ/ rarely occurs.

Vowels
	Front	Central	Back
Close	i		u
Mid	e		o
Open		a	
