= Maluku (province) =

Province in Maluku Islands, Indonesia

Maluku Moluccas
- Province
- Province of Maluku; Provinsi Maluku
- Coat of arms
- Nickname: The Spice Islands
- Motto: Siwalima (Ambonese) "Belong Together"
- Maluku in Indonesia
- Interactive map of Maluku
- Coordinates: 3°42′18″S 128°10′12″E
- Country: Indonesia
- Region: Maluku Islands (Eastern Indonesia)
- Capital and largest city: Ambon

Government
  - Body: Maluku Provincial Government
  - Governor: Hendrik Lewerissa (Gerindra)
  - Vice Governor: Abdullah Vanath
  - Legislature: Maluku Regional House of Representatives (DPRD)

Area
  - Total: 46,158.27 km^{2} (17,821.81 sq mi)
  - Rank: 15th in Indonesia
- Highest elevation (Mount Binaiya): 3,027 m (9,931 ft)

Population
  - Total: 1,970,563
  - Density: 42.69144/km^{2} (110.5703/sq mi)

Demographics
  - Ethnic groups: Significantly mixed ethnicity; Alfur, Ambonese, Chinese, Bugis, Butonese, Javanese, other Indonesians
  - Religion (2021): Islam (52.85%): Christianity (46.3%); Protestantism (39.4%); Catholicism (6.9%); Hinduism (0.32%); Buddhism (0.02%); Folk religion (0.55%)
  - Languages: Indonesian (official), Ambonese Malay (lingua franca), Kei, Fordata, Yamdena, Buru, Tarangan, Alune, Wemale, Bobot, Buano, Seti, Nuaulu, other languages
- Time zone: UTC+09 (Indonesia Eastern Time)
- ISO 3166 code: ID-MA
- HDI (2024): ▲0.734 (25th) – high
- Website: malukuprov.go.id

Maluku (/məˈlʊkuː, -ˈluː-/ mə-LUU-koo, -LOO-; Indonesian: [maˈluku]) is a province of Indonesia. It is located in Eastern Indonesia, between Sulawesi and Western New Guinea, and comprises the central and southern regions of the Maluku Islands. It is directly adjacent to North Maluku, Southwest Papua, and West Papua in the north; Central Sulawesi and Southeast Sulawesi in the west; the Banda Sea, Australia, Timor-Leste, and East Nusa Tenggara in the south; and the Arafura Sea, Central Papua, and South Papua in the east. The land area is 46,158.27 km^{2}, and the total population of this province at the 2010 census was 1,533,506 people, rising to 1,848,923 at the 2020 census, and the official estimate in mid 2025 was 1,970,563 (comprising 996,157 males and 974,396 females), increasing by about 25,000 per year. The largest city and capital of Maluku province is Ambon on the small Ambon Island.

Maluku has two main religions, namely Islam which at the 2020 census was adhered to by 52.85% of the population of the province and Christianity which is embraced by 46.3% (39.4% Protestantism and 7.0% Catholicism).

All the Maluku Islands were part of a single province from 1950 until 1999. In 1999, the northern part of Maluku (then comprising the Maluku Utara Regency, the Halmahera Tengah Regency and the City of Ternate) were split off to form a separate province of North Maluku (Maluku Utara), separated from the remaining (South) Maluku Province by the Seram Sea.

== Etymology ==
Historically, the term Maluku referred to the four royal centers in North Maluku, namely Ternate, Tidore, Bacan and Jailolo. A type of confederation consisting of the four kingdoms, which most likely emerged in the 14th century, was called Moloku Kie Raha or "The Four Mountains of Maluku". Although the four kingdoms subsequently expanded and covered the entire North Maluku region (as now defined) and parts of Sulawesi and New Guinea, the area of expansion was originally not included in the term Maluku. This only referred to the four main clove-producing islands to the west of Halmahera: Ternate, Tidore. Moti and Makian. Bacan further to the south, and Jailolo on Halmahera, were also commonly included in Maluku Proper, the four kingdoms forming a ritual quadripartition with connotations to local cosmology.

The etymology of the word Maluku is not very clear, and it has been a matter of debate for many experts. The first recorded word that can be identified with Maluku comes from Nagarakretagama, an Old Javanese eulogy of 1365. Canto 14 stanza 5 mentioned Maloko, which Pigeaud identified with Ternate or Moluccas. A theory holds that the name Maluku comes from the concept of "Maluku Kie Raha". "Raha" means four, while "kie" here means mountain, referring to 4 mountains of Ternate, Tidore, Bacan, and Jailolo (Halmahera), which have their own kolano (title for local kings). Therefore, the Maluku can come from: "Moloku" here meaning to grasp or hold. In this context, the meaning of "Moloku Kie Raha" is "the confederation of four mountains". However, the root word "loku" comes from local Malay creole word for a unit, therefore not from an indigenous language. The other possibility is that the word "Maloko" is a combination of "Ma", meaning "support" and "Loko" referring to the area. The phrase "Maloko Kie Raha" means "the place/world which has four mountains".

== History ==
=== The pre-colonial era ===
The region was first settled by Melanesians at least 40,000 years ago, collectively now known as the Alifuru tribes.These people are the indigenous inhabitants of Maluku, along with the later Austronesian migration.

At the beginning of the 14th century the Majapahit Kingdom ruled maritime Southeast Asia. At that time, traders from Java Establish a cooperation with Moluccan traders.

During the Ming dynasty, spices from Maluku were introduced in various works of art and history. In a painting by W.P. Groeneveldt, titled Gunung Dupa, Maluku, is described as a green mountainous region filled with cloves – an oasis in the middle of the southeastern sea. Marco Polo also described the clove trade in Maluku during his visit to Sumatra.

Before the arrival of European Nation, the Maluku islands had been ruled by several sultanates that played an important role in the spice trade, especially cloves and nutmeg. In the Maluku region, four major sultanates – Ternate, Tidore, Jailolo, and Bacan – formed a power structure known as the "Moloku Kie Raha," or "Four Mountains of Maluku." The four had dynamic relationships, both alliances and rivalries, that played a vital role in maintaining stability and prosperity in the region, especially through the valuable spice trade.

The Sultanate of Ternate was one of the most influential sultanates in Maluku and played an important role in the clove trade that connected Maluku with traders from Asia and the Middle East. Founded around the 13th century, Ternate developed into a center of maritime power and the spread of Islam in the eastern part of the archipelago. This sultanate established strong diplomatic relations with major kingdoms in Southeast Asia, such as the Sultanate of Malacca and the Majapahit Kingdom, strengthening its position in international trade routes. Under the rule of famous sultans such as Sultan Baabullah, Ternate was even able to expel the Portuguese and maintain its sovereignty, which made it a symbol of strength and independence in Maluku.

The Sultanate of Tidore, which grew in almost the same period, also played an important role in Maluku. Like Ternate, Tidore developed a formidable maritime power and had extensive diplomatic relations, including with areas in the Southern Philippines. Tidore had a strong military tradition and often formed alliances with kingdoms in the northern region to face external threats, especially from European powers such as Portugal and Spain. Under the rule of Sultan Nuku, Tidore built local alliances and waged resistance that succeeded in maintaining its sovereignty while maintaining control over the spice trade.

Meanwhile, the Jailolo Sultanate and the Bacan Sultanate also played a significant role in maintaining political and social balance in Maluku. Sultanate of Jailolo, as one of the oldest sultanates, has a very rich cultural tradition and is a spiritual and cultural center that is respected among the people of Maluku. During its heyday, Jailolo became a respected local power, with influence not only on political aspects but also social and cultural aspects. The Sultanate of Bacan, although not as large as Ternate and Tidore, had a strategic role in trade routes and became an important supporter of the two sultanates, strengthening the defense system and relations with communities in the southern region.

These four sultanates, through the Moloku Kie Raha system, demonstrated a bond of unity in the face of external threats and in managing the economic and cultural potential of Maluku. Although Ternate and Tidore often stand out in the role of trade and resistance to foreign powers, Jailolo and Bacan remain an important part of this structure, both as a balancing force and as a symbol of Maluku's cultural diversity. Their cooperation and competition illustrate the complexity of local politics that helped maintain Maluku's identity and sovereignty for centuries, making this region a unique center of the spice trade in the world.

The era of the sultanate began to change drastically with the arrival of the Portuguese in the early 16th century, followed by the Spanish, Dutch, and then the British. European penetration in the region led to the weakening of local power and major changes in the political and economic structure of Maluku.

=== The colonial era ===
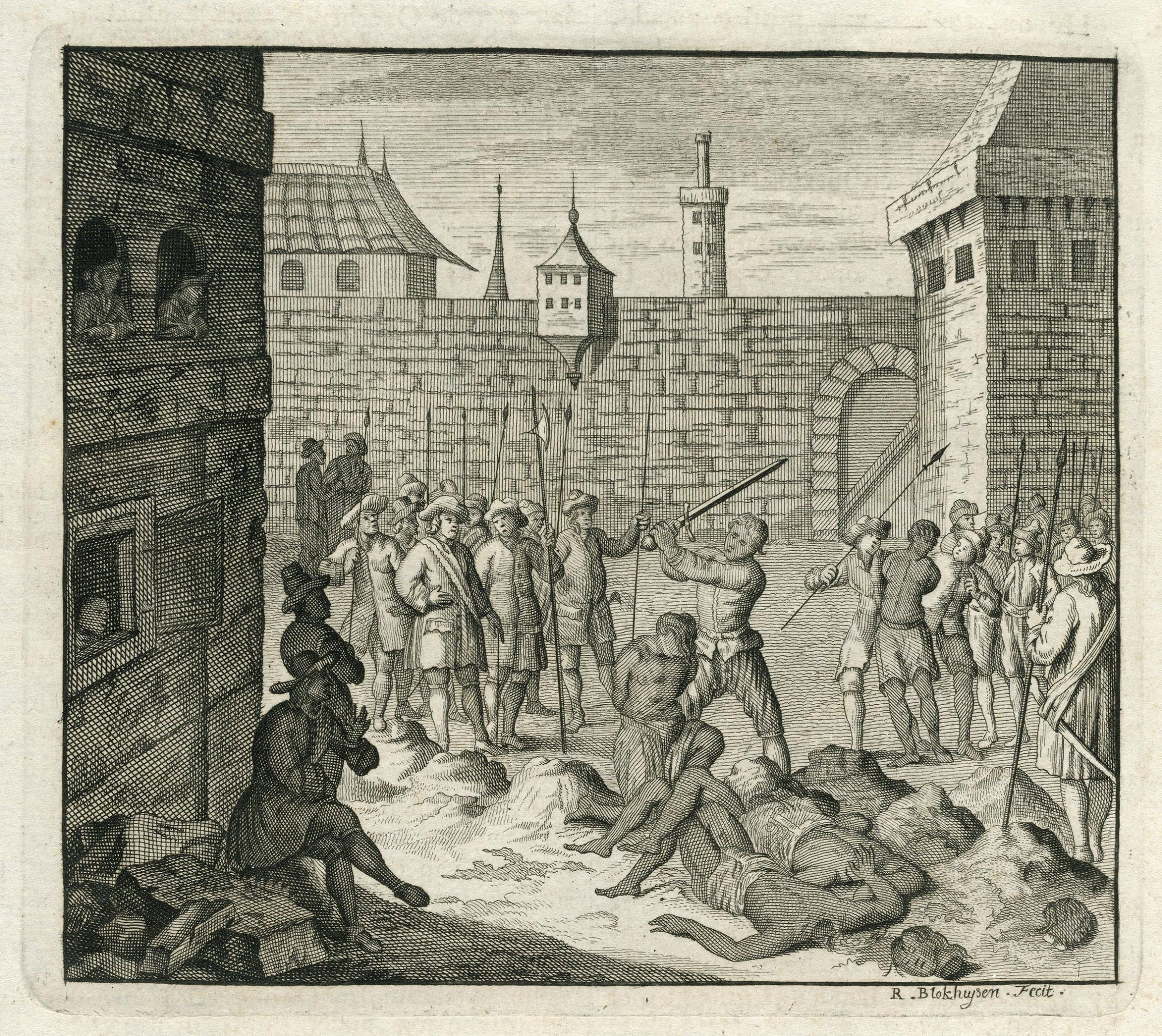
Beheading of Moluccan 'mutineers' by the VOC at Fort Victoria on Ambon in 1653.

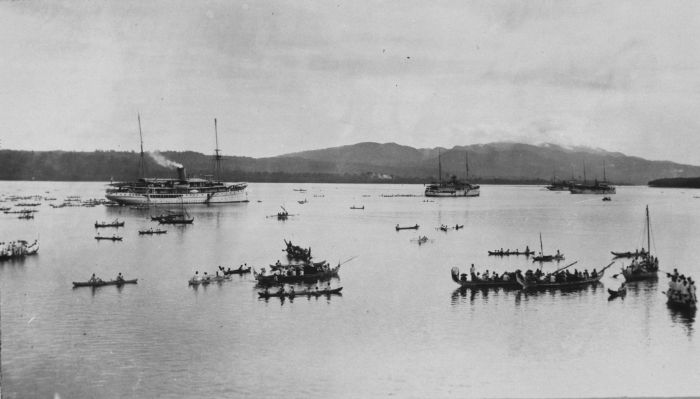
Dutch ships in Maluku during the colonial era

The first Europeans to arrive in Maluku were the Portuguese, in 1512. At that time two Portuguese fleets, under the leadership of António de Abreu and Francisco Serrão, landed in the Banda Islands and the Penyu Islands. After they established relations with local residents and kings, such as the Sultanate of Ternate on the island of Ternate, the Portuguese were given permission to build fortifications in Pikaoli, as well as the old Hitu State, and Mamala on Ambon Island. The Portuguese gained a monopoly while at the same time carrying out the spread of Catholicism.

One of the famous missionaries was Francis Xavier. Arriving in Ambon on February 14, 1546, then traveling to Ternate, arriving in 1547, visiting islands in the Maluku Islands to spread Catholicism.

The relationship between the Portuguese and Ternatean broke down in 1570, resulting in a war with Sultan Babullah that lasted for 5 years (1570–1575), causing the Portuguese to be expelled from Ternate and were driven to Tidore and Ambon.

The resistance of the Moluccas to the Portuguese was used by the Dutch to gain a foothold in Maluku. In 1605, the Dutch managed to force the Portuguese to surrender their defenses in Ambon to Steven van der Hagen and at Tidore to the Sebastiansz Cornelisz. Similarly, the British fortress in Kambelo, Seram Island, was destroyed by the Dutch. Giving the Dutch control of most of the Maluku region.

The Dutch position in Maluku grew stronger with the establishment of the Dutch East India Company (VOC) in 1602, and then the Netherlands became the sole ruler in Maluku. Under the ruthless leadership of Jan Pieterszoon Coen, Chief of Operations of the VOC, the clove and nutmeg trade in Maluku came under VOC control and remained so for almost 350 years. For this purpose, the VOC did not hesitate to exterminate or enslave great parts of the local populations, for instance in the Banda genocide, nor to expel the Portuguese, Spanish and the British. Tens of thousands of Moluccans were victims of VOC brutality.

During the Napoleonic Wars, British forces captured Maluku as the Netherlands were under French occupation. After the Anglo-Dutch Treaty of 1814, the British returned Maluku to the Dutch. The Dutch returned in 1817.

The return of the Dutch in 1817 evoked strong resistance from the Moluccans. This was due to political, economic and social relations conditions that had been bad for two centuries. Moluccan people of the Ambon Islands rose up and took up arms under the leadership of Thomas Matulessy who was given the title Kapitan Pattimura, a former major sergeant of the British army.

On May 15, 1817, an attack was launched against Fort Duurstede on Saparua island, resulting in the death of Resident Johannes Rudolph van den Berg and his family. Pattimura was assisted by Philip Latumahina, Anthony Ribok, and Said Orders.

The news of this Pattimura's victory aroused the spirit of popular resistance throughout Maluku. Paulus Tiahahu and his daughter Martha Christina Tiahahu fought the Dutch on Nusa Laut, and Kapitan Ulupaha in Ambon.

But this resistance was crushed by the Dutch, being heavily outnumbered. On December 16, 1817, Pattimura and his colleagues were sentenced to death on the gallows, at Fort Niew Victoria, Ambon, while Martha Christina Tiahahu died on the boat during her voyage to Java and her body was released into the Banda Sea.

=== Modern era ===
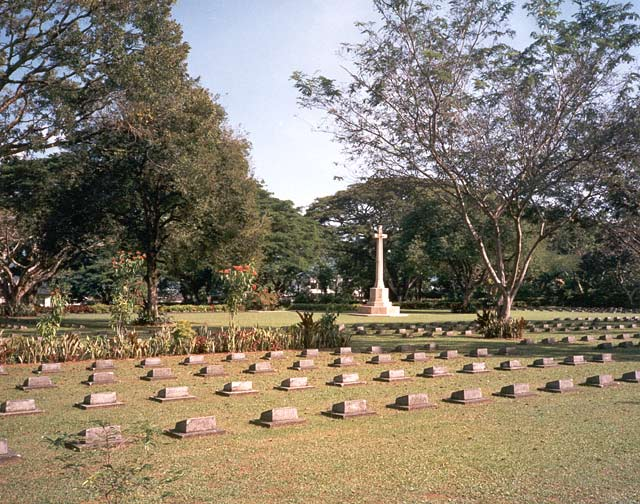
Ambon War Cemetery monument, a war cemetery housing the remains of 1,777 Australian, Dutch, and British soldiers.

Following the outbreak of the Pacific War on 7 December 1941, as part of World War II the region was occupied by the Japanese. The Japanese attacked on 31 January 1942, landing at Hutu beach on the north coast, and Ritung beach in the south. They were opposed by soldiers of the KNIL and a small Australian contingent. The KNIL commander was captured the day after the attack, and the last defenders of the airfield were overcome a few days later. The battle was followed by the summary execution of more than 300 Allied PoWs in the Laha massacre.

On 15 August 1945, Japan capitulated to the Allied forces. Two days later, the Proclamation of Independence of Indonesia was declared. Maluku was declared as one of the provinces of the Republic of Indonesia. However, the formation and position of Maluku was forced to take place in Jakarta, as after the Japanese surrender, the Netherlands Indies Civil Administration (NICA) immediately re-entered Maluku to assume control. The Dutch controlled Maluku until 1949, when in accordance to the Dutch–Indonesian Round Table Conference, the Dutch recognized sovereignty of Indonesia. The Dutch soon left Maluku. Due to a deep distrust of the Indonesian leadership, which was predominantly Javanese Muslim, in 1951 an independent Republic of the South Moluccas (Indonesian: RMS, Republik Maluku Selatan) was proclaimed at Ambon. The RMS had strong support among the former Moluccans colonial soldiers. Indonesian forces invaded Maluku to crush the separatists. The main stronghold of the RMS on Ambon was defeated by Indonesian forces in November 1950, while a smaller scale guerilla struggle continued on Seram Island until 1962. The defeat on Ambon however resulted in the flight of the self-declared RMS government from the islands, and the formation of a government in exile in the Netherlands. The following year some 12,000 Moluccan soldiers accompanied by their families went to the Netherlands.

In April and May 1958 during the Permesta rebellion in North Sulawesi, the United States supported and supplied the rebels. Pilots from a Taiwan-based CIA front organisation, Civil Air Transport, flying CIA B-26 Invader aircraft, repeatedly raided targets on Ambon. From April 27 until 18 May there were CIA air raids on Ambon city. On May 8, 1958, CIA pilot Allen Pope raided the Indonesian Air Force base at Liang in the northeast of the island, damaging the runway and destroying a Consolidated PBY Catalina. The Indonesian Air Force had only one serviceable fighter aircraft on Ambon Island, a North American P-51 Mustang at Liang. Pope's last air raid was on 18 May, when an Indonesian pilot at Liang, Captain Ignatius Dewanto, was scrambled to the P-51. Pope had attacked Ambon city before Dewanto could catch him, but Dewanto intercepted him just as Pope was attacking a pair of troop ships in an Indonesian fleet west of Ambon Island. The B-26 was brought down by fire from both Dewanto and anti-aircraft gunners on board the ship. Pope and his Indonesian radio operator bailed and were captured, which immediately exposed the level of CIA support for the Permesta rebellion. Embarrassed, the Eisenhower administration quickly ended CIA support for Permesta and withdrew its agents and remaining aircraft from the conflict.

== Geography ==
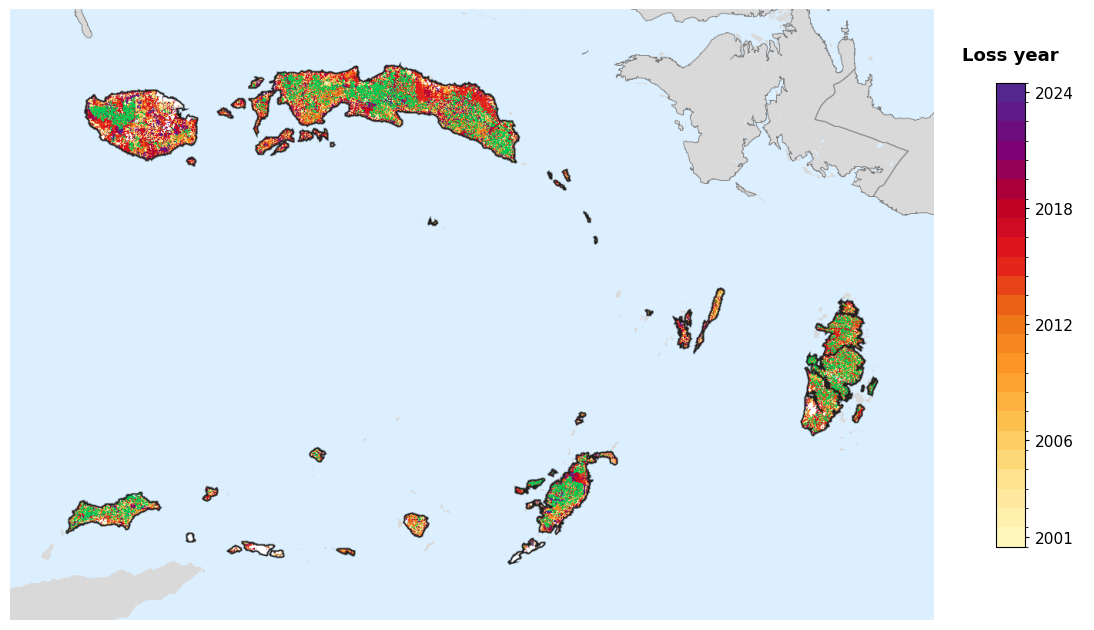
Tree-cover loss year in Maluku, 2001-2024, from the Global Forest Change dataset.

Maluku Province is bordered by North Maluku in the north, West Papua in the East, Southeast Sulawesi and Central Sulawesi in the West, and the nation of Timor-Leste and Australia in the south. While the total area consists of 527,191 km^{2} of sea area, and 46,158.27 km^{2} of land area, or in other words around 90% of Maluku is sea area. As an archipelago province, Maluku has 559 islands, which include some relatively large islands: Seram (18,625 km^{2}), Buru (9,000 km^{2}) Yamdena (5,085 km^{2}) and Wetar (3,624 km^{2}).

Most of the province's islands lie along two mainly submerged oceanic ridges which form the eastwards extension of the Lesser Sunda Islands; the inner arc runs from Wetar Island through the Romang Islands and Damar Island (with its northeasterly outliers) to end at the Banda Islands; the outer arc extends from the Wetar Strait through Kisar Island, the Letti Islands, the Sermata Islands, the Babar Islands, the Tanimbar Islands, the Kei Islands (more precisely, the Kur Island group in the west of the Kei Islands), the Watubela Islands and the Gorong Islands, ending with Seram Island and Buru Island. With the dominant condition of regional waters, Maluku is very open to interacting with other provinces and surrounding countries.

The Maluku islands have a tropical monsoon climate, this climate is greatly influenced by the presence of vast marine waters and takes place in tune with the climatic season there. The average temperature based on Meteorological stations in Ambon, Tual and Saumlaki are C 26.80, 27.70 C and 27.40 C. Minimum temperatures are 24.00, 24.70 C and 23.80 C, respectively, while the temperature Tual, the average humidity reaches 85.4% when recording Saumlaki Meteorological Station shows the average humidity is 80.2%.

The topography of the average condition of the Ambon region is rather flat, starting from the coast to residential areas. The mainland morphology of Ambon also varies from flat, bumpy, bumpy, hilly and mountainous with soft steep slopes to slightly dominant. The flat area has a slope of 0–3%, corrugated slope 3–8%, corrugated area 8–15%, hilly area 15–30% slope elevation and mountainous area greater than 30%. As for the Central Maluku Regency, West Seram and East Seram, the topography is generally hilly. 0–2%, tilt / wavy 3–15% rather steep 15–40% and very steep 40%.

Topography in the Southeast Maluku Regency is divided into plains, hills and mountains with flat slopes (0–3%), flat / bumpy (3–8%), bumpy (8–15%), rather steep (15–30%) and very steep (> 50%). The height of the sea surface area is divided into three classes, namely in the low altitude area (000–100 m elevation), middle (100–500 m), and high altitude (> 500 m).

The topography of Buru Regency is mostly hilly and mountainous with a slope of 15–40% and 40%, the remaining height is from ordinary varieties. The highest mountain peak is located in the Kapalamada region north west of Buru with an altitude of 2736 meters above sea level (ASL), after Lake Rana with a height of more than 1000 meters above sea level, Lake Rana is estimated at around 700–750 meters above sea level. Using a landscape approach, Buru district is classified above, the coastal hills of the plains and mountains include varieties of highlands and slopes.

=== List of major islands and groups in Maluku Province ===
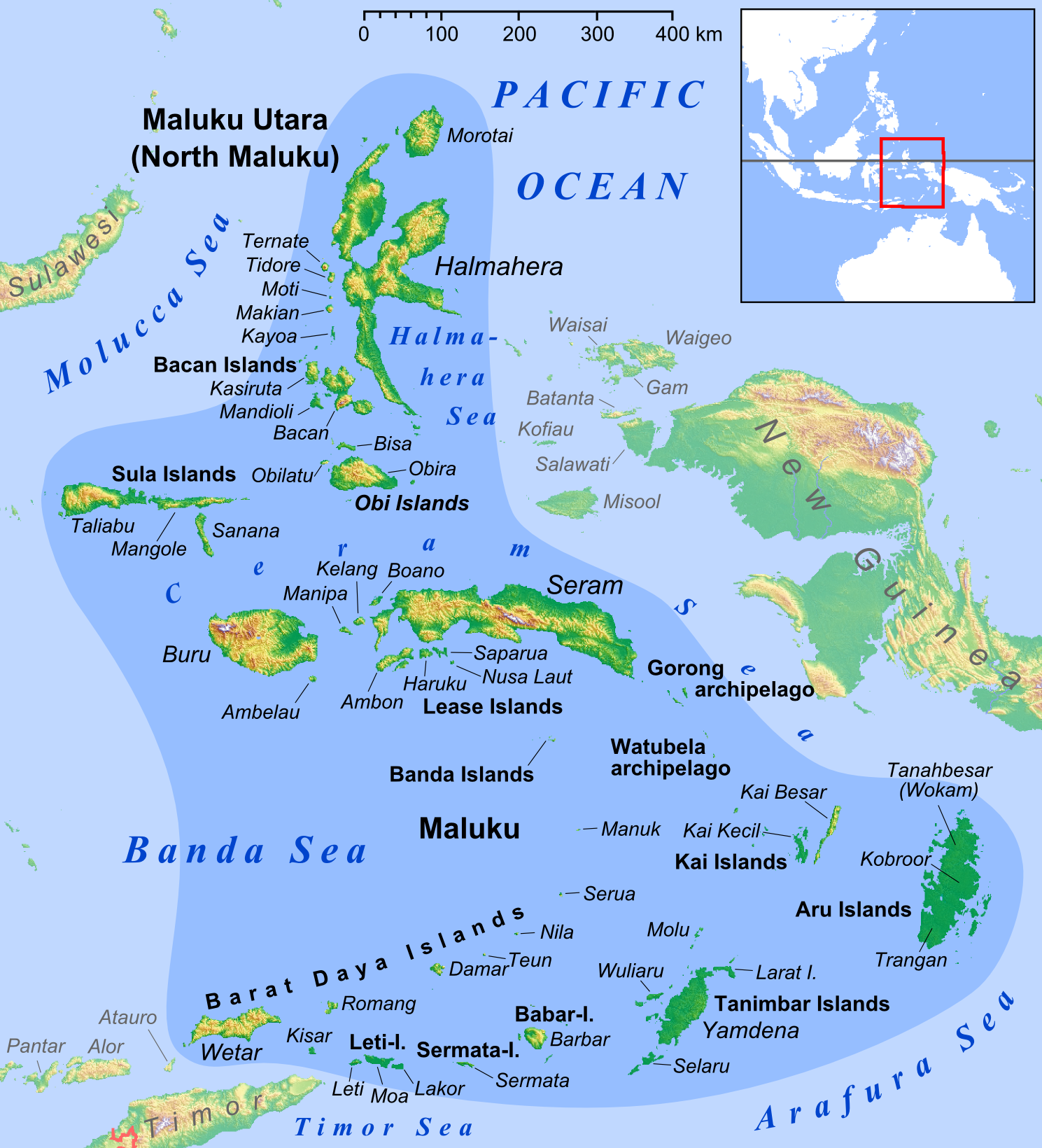
Maluku Province is the south part of the Maluku Islands (that part south of the Seram Sea on this map).

- Ambon Island
- Aru Islands (Kepulauan Aru)
- Banda Islands (Kepulauan Banda)
- Buru Island, including offshore Ambelau Island
- Kai Islands (Kepulauan Kai)
- Gorong archipelago (Pulau-pulau Gorong)
- Lease Islands (Kepulauan Lease) includes Saparua, Nusa Laut and Haruku Islands
- Seram (the largest island) includes islands off its coasts, particularly Manipa, Kelong and Boana Islands to the west
- Southwestern Islands (Barat Daya Islands) includes Wetar Island, Kisar Island, Romang Islands, Damer Island and outliers, Leti Islands, Sermata Islands and Babar Islands
- Tanimbar Islands (Kepulauan Tanimbar)
- Watubela archipelago (Kepulauan Watubela)

== Government and administrative divisions ==
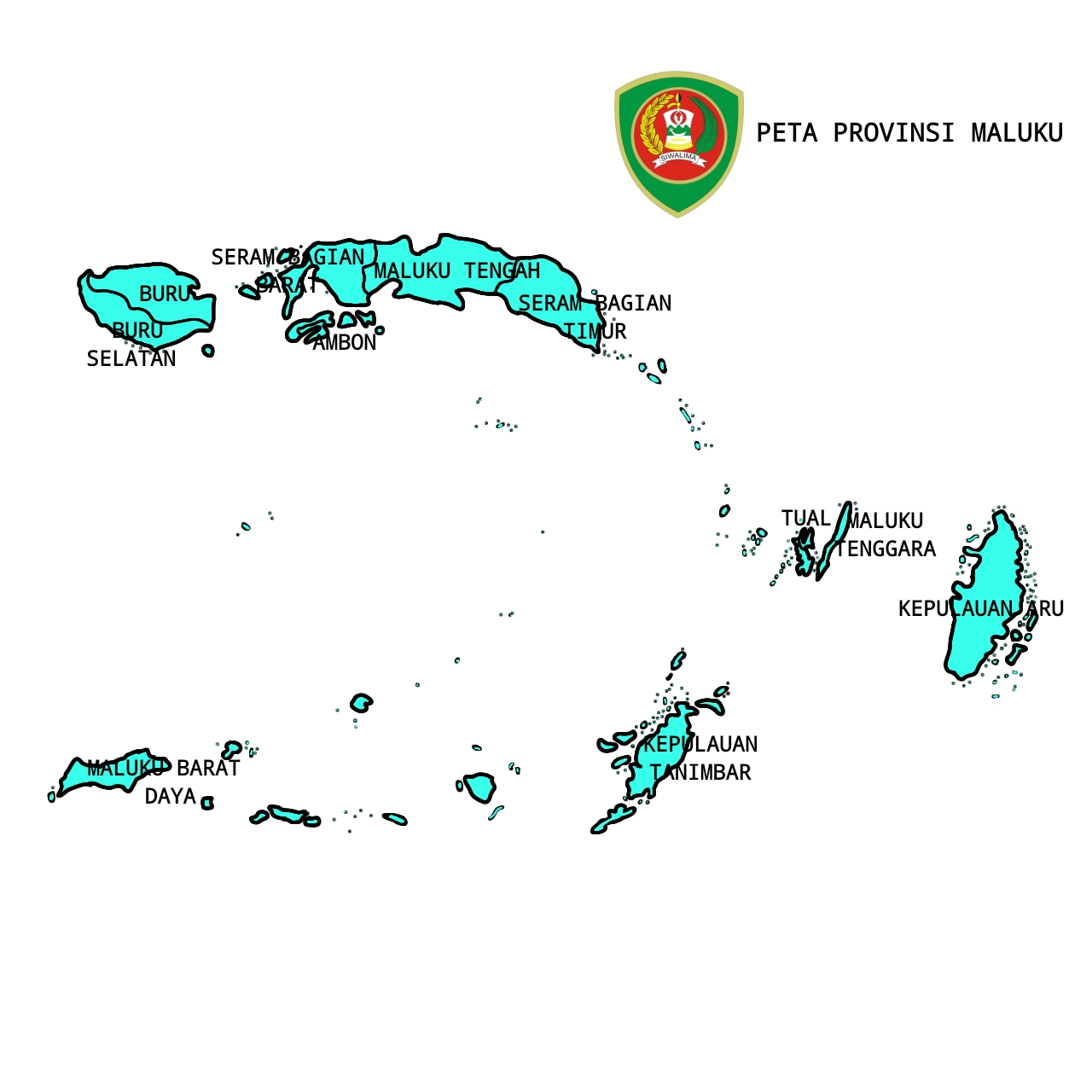
Maluku Province administrative division

Following the splitting off of the northern parts of the regency in 1999 to form the new North Maluku Province (Maluku Utara), the residual province of Maluku was composed of two regencies (Central Maluku and Southeast Maluku) and the City of Ambon. However, on 4 October 1999, two new regencies were created with the separation of Buru Regency from Central Maluku, and West Southeast Maluku Regency from Southeast Maluku. Three additional regencies were created on 18 December 2003 (under Law No. 40 of 2003)—East Seram Regency and West Seram Regency, both from parts of Central Maluku, and Aru Islands Regency from part of Southeast Maluku (which was thus left to comprise just the Kai Islands). On 17 July 2007, the City of Tual was separated from Southeast Maluku, and on 24 June 2008, two further regencies were created—South Buru Regency from part of Buru, and Southwest Maluku Regency from part of West Southeast Maluku. The residual part of West Southeast Maluku Regency was subsequently renamed the Tanimbar Islands Regency on 23 January 2019.

Thus the province of Maluku is currently divided into nine regencies (kabupaten) and the two cities (kota) of Ambon and Tual, which form the tenth and eleventh regency-level administrative divisions. The regencies and cities, with their administrative capitals, are listed below with their areas and their populations at the 2010 census and at the 2020 census, together with the official estimates for mid 2025. The table also includes the numbers of districts (kecamatan) and villages (urban kelurahan and rural desa) in each city or regency.

Kode Wilayah	Name of City or Regency	Capital	Area in km^{2}	Pop'n 2010 census	Pop'n 2020 census	Pop'n mid-2025 estimate	No. of districts	No. of villages	HDI 2022
81.71	Ambon City (Kota Ambon)		236.66	331,254	347,288	366,301	5	50	0.816 (Very High)
81.72	Tual City (Kota Tual) (in the Kei Islands)		234.41	58,082	88,280	93,884	5	30	0.686 (Medium)
81.07	Aru Islands (Kepulauan Aru)	Dobo	8,096.72	84,138	102,237	110,930	10	119	0.642 (Medium)
81.04	Buru Regency	Namlea	4,915.56	108,445	135,238	144,124	10	82	0.694 (Medium)
81.01	Central Maluku Regency (Maluku Tengah)	Masohi	8,253.92	361,698	423,094	445,618	18	192	0.718 (High)
81.05	East Seram Regency (Seram Bagian Timur)	Bula or Dataran Hunimoa	5,725.44	99,065	137,972	149,475	15	198	0.650 (Medium)
81.09	South Buru Regency (Buru Selatan)	Namrole	3,678.69	53,671	75,410	82,219	6	79	0.653 (Medium)
81.02	Southeast Maluku Regency (Maluku Tenggara)	Langgur, in the Kei Islands	1,016.92	96,442	121,511	127,502	11	191	0.668 (Medium)
81.08	Southwest Maluku Regency (Maluku Barat Daya)	Tiakur, in the Leti Islands	4,551.67	70,714	81,928	88,571	17	118	0.630 (Medium)
81.03	Tanimbar Islands Regency (Kepulauan Tanimbar)	Saumlaki, in the Tanimbar Islands	4,431.08	105,341	123,572	132,317	10	82	0.634 (Medium)
81.06	West Seram Regency (Seram Bagian Barat)	Piru or Dataran Hunipopu	5,017.14	164,656	212,393	229,622	11	92	0.666 (Medium)

The province forms one of Indonesia's 84 national electoral districts to elect members to the People's Representative Council. The Maluku Electoral District consists of all of the 9 regencies and 2 cities in the province, and elects 4 members to the People's Representative Council.

== Demographics ==
Historical population
Year	Pop.	±%
1971	1,089,565	—
1980	1,411,006	+29.5%
1990	1,857,790	+31.7%
1995	2,086,516	+12.3%
2000	1,205,539	−42.2%
2010	1,533,506	+27.2%
2015	1,683,856	+9.8%
2020	1,848,923	+9.8%
2021	1,862,626	+0.7%
2022	1,881,727	+1.0%
2023	1,908,753	+1.4%
2025	1,970,563	+3.2%
Source: Badan Pusat Statistik 2026 and earlier. The sharp drop between 1995 and 2000 is due to the separation out in 1999 of the new province of North Maluku.

=== Ethnicity ===
Since ancient times, many of the Maluku people already had mixed blood with other ethnic groups, namely with Chinese, Indians, Persians, Europeans (generally the Dutch, Portuguese and Spanish), then the Arabs were very common considering this area had been settled by foreign nations for 2,300 years and gave birth to new descendants, which is no longer a pure Melanesian race but still inherits and lives with the Melanesian-Alifuru style.

Because of this mixture of culture and race with Chinese, Indians, Persians, Europeans and Arabs, Maluku is the only Indonesian territory that is classified as an area that has the largest multiracial population other than East Nusa Tenggara. Many Moluccans still retained foreign surnames from foreign countries such as the Netherlands (Van Afflen, Van Room, De Wanna, De Kock, Kniesmeijer, Gaspersz, Ramschie, Payer, Ziljstra, Van der Weden, etc.), Portugal (Da Costa, De Fretes, Que, Carliano, De Souza, De Carvalho, Pareira, Courbois, Frandescolli, etc.), Spain (Oliviera, Diaz, De Jesus, Silvera, Rodriguez, Montefalcon, Mendoza, De Lopez, etc.) and Hadhramaut in Yemen (Al-Kaff, Al Chatib, Bachmid, Bakhwereez, Bahasoan, Al-Qadri, Alaydrus, Assegaff, etc.)

Today, the people of Maluku are not only found in Indonesia but are spread in various countries in the world. Most of those who migrate abroad are due to various reasons, of which the most classic was the large-scale movement of the Moluccans to Europe in the 1950s and settled there until now. Another reason is to get a better, more knowledgeable life, marrying other ethnicities, who later settle down and have generations of new Moluccans abroad. These Maluku expatriates can be found in quite large communities and are concentrated in several countries such as the Netherlands (which is considered the second homeland by the Moluccas other than the land of Maluku itself), Suriname, Australia, and the United States. The Maluku community in other regions of Indonesia can be found in Medan, Palembang, Bandung, Greater Jakarta, Central Java, Yogyakarta, East Java, Makassar, Kupang, Manado, East Kalimantan, Sorong, and Jayapura.

=== Language ===
The languages used in Maluku, especially in Ambon, have been influenced by foreign languages, often by explorers who have visited and even occupied and colonized Maluku in the past. The nations were the Arabic, Spanish, Portuguese, and Dutch. Collectively, the native languages of Maluku are known as bahasa tanah (lit. 'language of the land') by native people, but their use is currently very limited, especially in traditional processions, because it is considered a sacred language, as well as the widespread influence of Ambonese Malay and Indonesian.

The Ambonese Malay, a Malay-based creole language, as the lingua franca in Maluku, has been understood by almost all residents of Maluku and generally, little by little, is understood by other Eastern Indonesian people such as those in Ternate, Manado, Kupang, etc. because Ambonese Malay is related to other languages in the eastern provinces of Indonesia, such as Manado Malay in North Sulawesi, North Moluccan Malay in North Maluku, Kupang Malay in East Nusa Tenggara, and Papuan Malay in six provinces in Indonesian Papua.

Indonesian, as the official language and language of unity in the Unitary State of the Republic of Indonesia (NKRI), is used in official and formal public activities such as in government offices and in schools and in places such as museums, airports, and ports.

Maluku is the largest archipelago in all of Indonesia, although this area is 90% water and only 10% land. Maluku and North Maluku together compose the Maluku Islands. The large number of islands that are separated by long distances from each other also results in the increasingly diverse languages used in this province. Some of the most common languages spoken in Maluku — apart from Ambonese Malay and Indonesian — are:

- Alune language is used in three water streams, namely Tala, Mala, and Malewa in West Seram Regency.
- Bobot language, spoken by three ethnic groups, which also included the Nuaulu family, namely Atiahu, Werinama, and Batuasa in the East Seram Regency.
- Buano language, spoken by the residents of Buano Island who are known as Buano people in West Seram Regency.
- Buru language, spoken by the Buru people who live in Buru Regency, where it is the most commonly used regional language here.
- Kei language, spoken by the Kei people in the Kei Islands.
- Nuaulu language, spoken by the Nuaulu people in the south of Seram Island, is between Elpaputih Bay and Teluk Telutih.
- Seti language is spoken by the Seti people, in North Seram and East Teluti, and also as a trade language in Eastern Seram.
- Tarangan language, spoken in the Aru Islands.
- Wemale language, spoken by residents of Piru, Seruawan, Kamarian, and Rumberu in West Seram Regency.

=== Religion ===
Religion in Maluku (2022)
1. Islam (52.7%)
2. Protestantism (46.5%)
3. Hinduism (0.37%)
4. Buddhism (0.02%)
5. Folk religion (0.46%)

Most of the people of Maluku adhere to either Islam, (52.85% of the population) followed by Christianity (46.45% of the population); the latter are divided between followers of (Protestantism (39.39%) and Catholicism (6.87%). There are also adherents of folk religion, Hinduism and Buddhism. The spread of Islam was carried out by the Sultanates of Iha, Saulau, Hitu, and Hatuhaha and Arab traders who visited Maluku. While the spread of Christianity was carried out by missionaries from Portugal, Spain and the Netherlands.

Places of worship in Maluku Province in 2013 were recorded as follows:

- 2,345 churches
- 2,000 mosques
- 10 temples
- 5 Vihara

The Protestant Church of Maluku (Gereja Protestan Maluku or simply GPM) is the largest synod organization and church organization in Maluku, which has church congregations in almost the entire Sarane country throughout Maluku.

== Economy ==
Macroeconomically, Maluku's economic conditions tend to improve every year. One indicator is, among others, an increase in the value of GDP. In 2003 Maluku's GRDP reached 3.7 trillion rupiah and then increased to 4.05 trillion in 2004. Economic growth in 2004 reached 4.05 percent and increased to 5.06 percent in 2005.

The geographical condition of Maluku Province when viewed from the strategic side of business investment opportunities can be predicted that natural resources in the fisheries and marine sector can be used as prima donna businesses in Maluku, in addition to other sectors such as livestock and plantation subsector, trade sector and tourism sector as well as the service sector entirely has a high selling value and business potential.

Currently the economy of Maluku is dominated by agriculture, forestry and fisheries that contribute to about 25.00 percent of the total. Government service sector, defence and compulsory Social Security contribute to roughly 21 percent. The business field and retail trade; cars and motorcycles repair & services at 12.59 percent; construction sector contributes 7.41 percent. Maluku's economy in 2014 has shown positive improvement as compared to 2013. The GDP growth rate in 2014 reached 6.70 percent, while in 2013 amounted to 5.26 percent. The highest economic growth is in the field of electricity and gas supply business which grew by 31.11 percent. The business service is another sector that experienced positive growth in 2014. Other economic activities also recorded positive growth, including mining and quarrying (21.47 percent); education services business field (9.52 percent); transportation and warehousing business sector (8.77 percent); processing industry (8.42 percent); information and communication (7.62 per cent); financial services business (7.61 percent); construction (7.31 percent); real estate (7.10 percent).

In 2017, a Japanese oil company, Inpex Corporation acquired Abadi Field, a crude oil and natural gas field located in the Arafura Sea, near Tanimbar Islands. In 2017 the company to start the Pre FEED phase and hold a joint workshop with SKK Migas to prepare an offshore development plan for project of Block Masela.

== Culture ==
=== Music ===
The famous musical instruments are Tifa (a type of drum) and Totobuang, played together in an ensemble called a Tifa totobuang. Each musical instrument from Tifa to Totobuang has different functions and supports each other to give birth to a very distinctive color of music. But this music is dominated by Tifa musical instruments. It consists of Tifa, Tifa Jekir, Tifa Dasar, Tifa Potong, Tifa Jekir Potong and Tifa Bas, plus a large Gong and Toto Buang which is a series of small gongs placed on a table with several holes as a buffer. There is also a wind instrument namely Bia Skin (Shellfish).

In the culture of Maluku, there are also stringed instruments namely Ukulele and that can also be found in the Hawaiian culture in the United States. This can be seen when Maluku music from the past until now still has a characteristic in which there is the use of Hawaiian musical instruments both in pop songs and in accompanying traditional dances such as Katreji.

Other musical instruments is the Sawat. Sawat is a blend of Maluku culture and Middle Eastern culture. In a few centuries ago, the Arabs came to spread Islam in Maluku, then there was a mixture of cultures including music. It is evident in several Sawat musical instruments, such as Tambourines and Flutes that characterize Arabian music instruments.

Outside of the variety of musical instruments, Moluccan people are famous for being good at singing. Since long ago they have often sung in accompanying traditional dances. There are many famous Moluccan singers in both Indonesia and the Netherlands, such as Broery Pesulima, Daniel Sahuleka, Ruth Sahanaya, Eric Papilaya, Glen Fredly, etc.

=== Dance ===
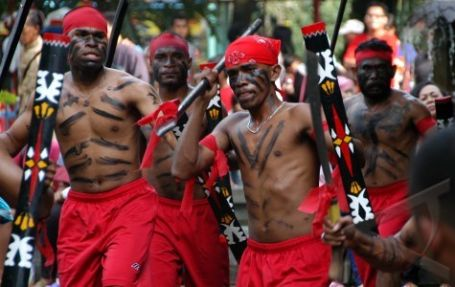
Cakalele, a traditional Moluccan dance

The famous dance from the Moluccas is the Cakalele which describes the might of the Moluccas. This dance is usually performed by adult men while holding Parang and Salawaku (Shield).

Other dances, such as Saureka-Reka, use sago palm fronds.

The dance which is a depiction of youth association is Katreji. Katreji dance is played in pairs between women and men with varied energetic and interesting movements. This dance is almost the same as European dances in general because Katreji is also an acculturation of European (Portuguese and Dutch) culture with Maluku culture. This is more evident in every signal in changing floor patterns and movements which still use Portuguese and Dutch as a process of bilingualism. This dance is accompanied by a violin instrument, bamboo flute, ukulele, karakas, guitar, tifa, and bass guitar with a more prominent western (European) musical pattern. This dance is still performed by the people of Maluku until now.

In addition to Katreji, the famous European influence is Polonaise, which is usually carried out by Moluccans at the time of marriage by each party member in pairs, forming a circle formation and carrying out light movements that can be followed by everyone, both young and old.

In addition, there's also a Crazy Bamboo Dance. Crazy bamboo dance is a special dance that is magical, originating from Suli Village. The uniqueness of this dance is that the dancers are burdened by bamboo which can move uncontrollably and this dance can be followed by anyone.

== Tourism ==
Some of the famous tourist attractions in Maluku include:

- Manusela National Park
- Pasir Panjang Beach
- Natsepa Beach, Ambon
- City Gate, Ambon

== In popular culture ==
Img19, a wallpaper of Windows Vista, is taken in Maluku, Indonesia. The wallpaper depicts a palm tree in front of the ocean, taken by Mark Lewis, and was licensed from Getty Images. A widescreen version of the wallpaper is img34.

== See also ==
- Baileo
- Districts of Maluku
- List of islands of Indonesia
- List of rivers of Maluku (province)

== Bibliography ==
- Ajisaka, Arya; Damayanti, Dewi (2010). Mengenal Pahlawan Indonesia [Knowing Indonesian Heroes] (in Indonesian) (Revised ed.). Jakarta: Kawan Pustaka. ISBN 978-979-757-430-7.
- Chauvel, Richard (1990). Nationalists, Soldiers and Separatists: The Ambonese islands from colonialism to revolt 1880-1950. Leiden: KITLV Press. ISBN 978-90-6718-025-2.
- Bertrand, Jacques (2004). Nationalism and ethnic conflict in Indonesia. Cambridge University Press. ISBN 978-0-521-52441-4.
- Conboy, Kenneth; Morrison, James (1999). Feet to the Fire CIA Covert Operations in Indonesia, 1957–1958. Annapolis: Naval Institute Press. ISBN 1-55750-193-9.
- Hedman, Eva-Lotta E. (2008). Conflict, violence, and displacement in indonesia. Cornell South East Asia Program Publications. pp. 29–231. ISBN 978-0-87727-775-0.
- Sidel, John Thayer (2007). Riots, pogroms, jihad: religious violence in Indonesia. NUS Press. ISBN 978-9971-69-357-2.
- War History Office of the National Defense College of Japan (2016). Remmelink, Willem (ed.). The Invasion of the Dutch East Indies (PDF). Leiden: Leiden University Press. ISBN 978-90-8728-237-0.
