= Benggoi language =

Austronesian language spoken in Maluku, Indonesia

Benggoi
- Native to: Indonesia (Maluku Islands)
- Region: Seram
- Native speakers: (350 cited 1989)
- Language family: Austronesian: Malayo-Polynesian; Central–Eastern; Central Maluku; East Central Maluku; East Seram; Manusela–Seti; Benggoi
- Dialects: Lesa; Benggoi; Balakeo

Language codes
- ISO 639-3: bgy
- Glottolog: beng1287
- ELP: Benggoi

Benggoi is an Austronesian language, or perhaps three languages, of Seram, Indonesia.
