= Central Maluku languages =

Subgroup of the Austronesian language family

Central Maluku
- Geographic distribution: Indonesia (Maluku Islands)
- Linguistic classification: Austronesian: Malayo-Polynesian (MP); Central–Eastern MP; Central Maluku
- Subdivisions: West; East

Language codes
- Glottolog: grea1302 Greater Seram Laut nunu1252 Nunusaku west2817 West Central Maluku

The Central Maluku languages are a proposed subgroup of the Central–Eastern Malayo-Polynesian branch of the Austronesian language family which comprises around fifty languages spoken principally on the Seram, Buru, Ambon and the Sula Islands, Indonesia. None of the languages have as many as fifty thousand speakers, and several are extinct.

== Classification ==
The traditional components of Central Maluku are the Sula, Buru, and East Central Maluku languages, plus the Ambelau isolate.

=== Collins (1983) ===
The following classification of the Central Maluku languages below is from Collins (1983:20, 22) and (1986).

- Central Maluku
  - West Central Maluku
    - Ambelau
    - Buru–Sula–Taliabo
      - Buru: Buru, Lisela, Palumata (extinct), Moksela (extinct)
      - Sula: Sula, Mangole
      - Taliabo
  - East Central Maluku (around Seram and Aru)
    - Banda–Geser
      - Banda
      - Seran Laut: Bati, Geser, Kowiai, Watubela
    - East Seram
      - Bobot–Masiwang
      - Setic: Hoti, Benggoi, Salas, Liana-Seti
    - Nunusaku
      - Kayeli
      - Patakai–Manusela
        - Nuaulu
        - Huaulu, Manusela
      - Three Rivers
        - Wemale
        - Amalumute
          - Yalahatan
          - Northwest Seram: Hulung, Saleman, Loun, Ulat Inai (Alune, Nakaʼela), Lisabata-Nuniali
      - Piru Bay languages (20 languages)
