= Nunusaku languages =

Language family

Nunusaku
- Ambon–Seram
- Geographic distribution: Indonesia
- Linguistic classification: Austronesian: Malayo-Polynesian (MP); Central–Eastern MP; Central Maluku; East Central Maluku; Nunusaku
- Proto-language: Proto-Nunusaku

Language codes
- Glottolog: nunu1252

The Nunusaku languages are a group of Malayo-Polynesian languages, spoken on and around the island of Seram, Indonesia. None of the languages have more than about twenty thousand speakers, and several are endangered with extinction.

The proto-language, Proto-Nunusaku, merged Proto-Malayo-Polynesian *z/*d as *d, and *l/*R/*j as *l.

== Classification ==
- Kayeli
- Patakai–Manusela
  - Nuaulu
  - Huaulu, Manusela
- Three Rivers
  - Wemale
  - Amalumute
    - Yalahatan
    - Northwest Seram: Hulung, Saleman, Loun, Ulat Inai (Alune, Nakaʼela), Lisabata-Nuniali
- Piru Bay languages (20 languages)
