= Bathippus =

- Head of a male B. montrouzieri

Scientific classification
- Kingdom: Animalia
- Phylum: Arthropoda
- Subphylum: Chelicerata
- Class: Arachnida
- Order: Araneae
- Infraorder: Araneomorphae
- Family: Salticidae
- Subfamily: Salticinae
- Genus: Bathippus; Thorell, 1892

Type species
- Plexippus macrognathus Thorell, 1881

Species
- See text

Genus of spiders

Bathippus is a genus of jumping spiders.

This genus is very similar to the genus Canama.

Members of this genus are distributed throughout the Australasian region.

The genus name is derived from Βάθιππος, a Greek name.

== Description ==
Females are 6 to 9 mm long, males up to 10 mm. Bathippus is a colorful, long-legged genus, with long, thin bodies. The males have long, robust, forward-pointing chelicerae. The colors differ between species, but the carapace is in most species orange, sometimes with lighter stripes. The opisthosoma is grey, sometimes with three or four pairs of dark grey marks. The legs are orange, with the latter two pairs lighter than those in front.

== Habits ==
Bathippus species are often found wandering about on shrubs in rain forests or their vicinity.

== Species ==
- Bathippus birmanicus Thorell, 1895 – Myanmar
- Bathippus brocchus (Thorell, 1881) – New Guinea
- Bathippus dentiferellus Strand, 1911 – Aru Islands
- Bathippus digitalis Zhang, Song & Li, 2003 – Singapore
- Bathippus dilanians (Thorell, 1881) – New Guinea, Aru Islands
- Bathippus elaphus (Thorell, 1881) – New Guinea
- Bathippus keyensis Strand, 1911 – Kei Islands
- Bathippus kochi (Simon, 1903) – Moluccas
- Bathippus latericius (Thorell, 1881) – New Guinea
- Bathippus macilentus Thorell, 1890 – Sumatra
- Bathippus macrognathus (Thorell, 1881) – New Guinea
- Bathippus macroprotopus Pocock, 1898 – Solomon Islands
- Bathippus manicatus Simon, 1902 – Borneo
- Bathippus molossus (Thorell, 1881) – New Guinea
- Bathippus montrouzieri (Lucas, 1869) – Queensland, New Caledonia
- Bathippus morsitans Pocock, 1897 – Borneo
- Bathippus oedonychus (Thorell, 1881) – New Guinea
- Bathippus oscitans (Thorell, 1881) – New Guinea
- Bathippus pahang Zhang, Song & Li, 2003 – Malaysia
- Bathippus palabuanensis Simon, 1902 – Java
- Bathippus papuanus (Thorell, 1881) – New Guinea, Solomon Islands
- Bathippus proboscideus Pocock, 1899 – New Guinea
- Bathippus rechingeri Kulczynski, 1910 – Solomon Islands
- Bathippus rectus Zhang, Song & Li, 2003 – Singapore
- Bathippus ringens (Thorell, 1881) – New Guinea
- Bathippus schalleri Simon, 1902 – Malaysia
- Bathippus sedatus Peckham & Peckham, 1907 – Borneo
- Bathippus seltuttensis Strand, 1911 – Aru Islands
- Bathippus shelfordi Peckham & Peckham, 1907 – Borneo
- Bathippus waoranus Strand, 1911 – Kei Islands
