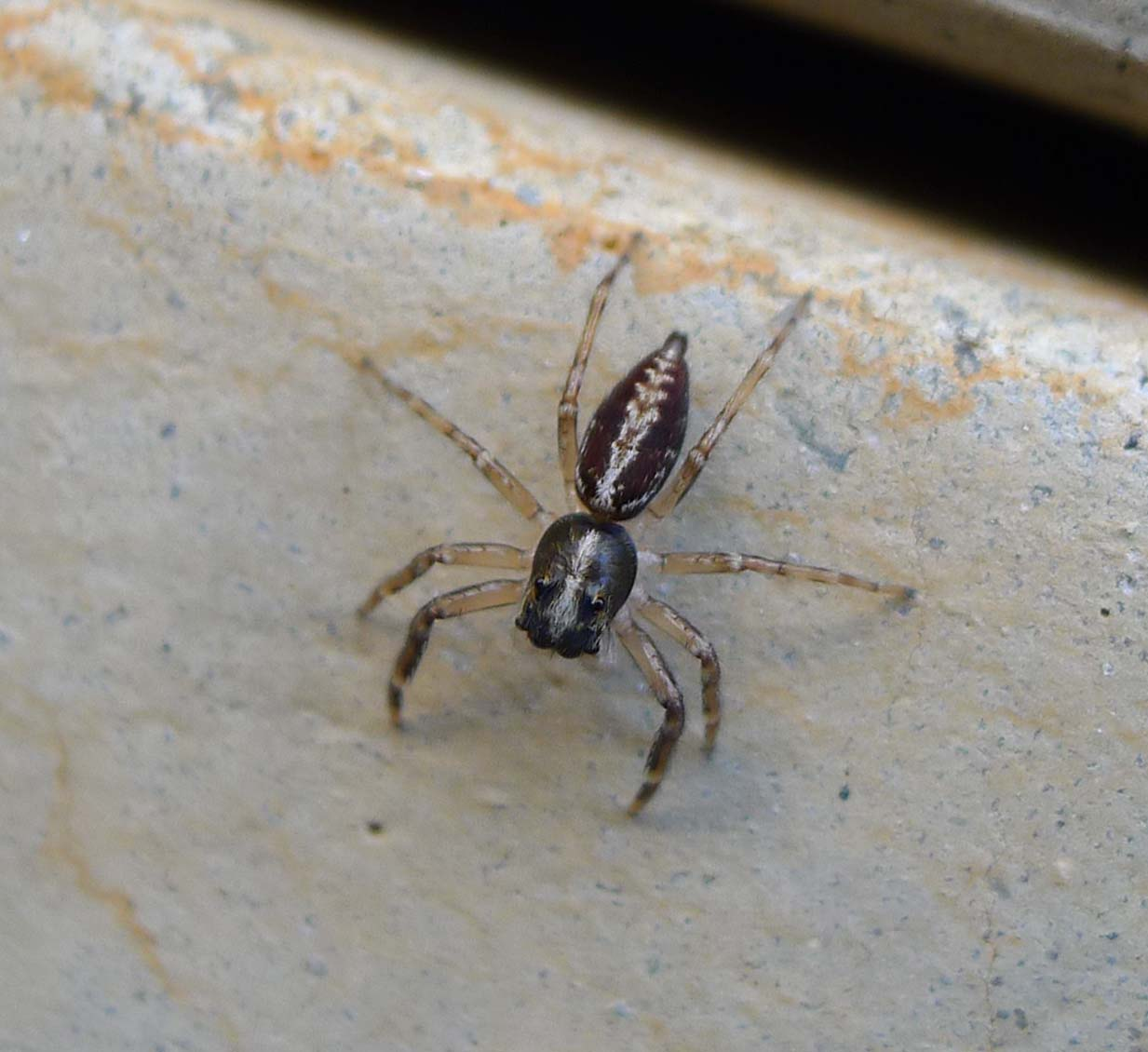
- Possibly Canama hinnulea

Scientific classification
- Kingdom: Animalia
- Phylum: Arthropoda
- Subphylum: Chelicerata
- Class: Arachnida
- Order: Araneae
- Infraorder: Araneomorphae
- Family: Salticidae
- Subfamily: Salticinae
- Genus: Canama; Simon, 1903

Type species
- Salticus forceps Doleschall, 1859

Species
- See text

= Canama =

Genus of spiders

Canama is a genus of spiders in the jumping spider family, Salticidae. Its five described species occur from Borneo to Queensland.

This genus is very similar to Bathippus.

== Description ==
Females are up to 8 mm (1/3 in) long, males up to 10 mm (3/8 in). The longish abdomen is clothed in white hairs with red streaks and bands. Males have very large, long chelicerae which diverge and project forwards. The long, spiny legs are dark with pale tarsi and metatarsi.

== Species ==
- Canama dorcas (Thorell, 1881) – Moluccas
- Canama forceps (Doleschall, 1859) – New Guinea
- Canama hinnulea (Thorell, 1881) – Queensland
- Canama inquirenda Strand, 1911 – Kei Islands
- Canama lacerans (Thorell, 1881) – Malaysia
- Canama rutila Peckham & Peckham, 1907 – Borneo
