= Docimocaria pulchra =

Scientific classification
- Kingdom: Animalia
- Phylum: Arthropoda
- Clade: Pancrustacea
- Class: Insecta
- Order: Coleoptera
- Suborder: Polyphaga
- Infraorder: Cucujiformia
- Family: Coccinellidae
- Genus: Docimocaria
- Species: D. pulchra

Binomial name
- Docimocaria pulchra (Crotch, 1874)

Synonyms
- Coelophora pulchra Crotch, 1874; Caria thoracica Weise, 1892

Species of beetle

Docimocaria pulchra is a species of beetle of the family Coccinellidae. It is found in Papua New Guinea and Indonesia (Aru, Seram and Kai Islands).

== Description ==
Adults reach a length of about 8.5–10 mm (0.33–0.39 in). The head and antennae are orange-red and the pronotum is black with large orange-red areas. The elytra are black, each with three large red patches and with the lateral borders and suture black. The scutellum is black and the ventral surface is mostly black.
