= Banda language =

Banda language may refer to:

- One of the Banda languages of central Africa
- Banda language (Maluku), an Austronesian language of Indonesia
