= Alifuru people =

Broad term for certain peoples of Southeast Asia

Alifuru
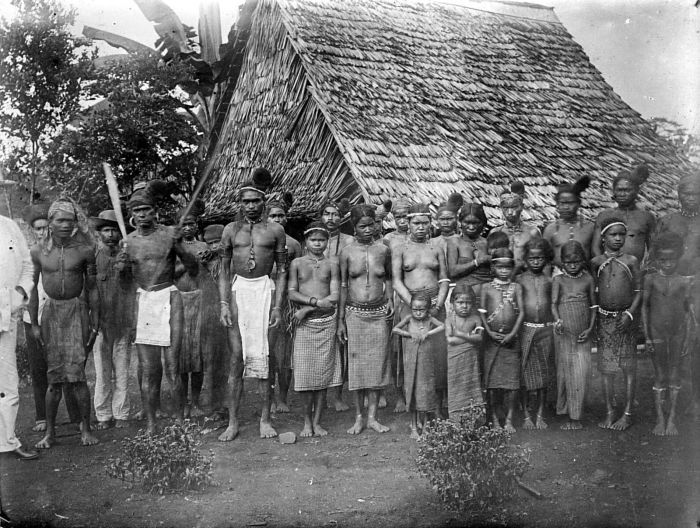
- Alfur people, most likely Alune people, in the mountains of Seram.

Regions with significant populations
- Indonesia (Maluku Islands)

Religion
- Animism, Islam, Christianity and Buddhism

Related ethnic groups
- Moluccans, Melanesians

The Alifuru, Alfur, Alfurs, Alfuros, Alfures, Aliforoes, or Horaforas (Dutch: Alfoeren) is a collective term for the indigenous people of mixed Melanesian and Austronesian descent in the Maluku Islands in eastern Indonesia. Alifuru was a broad term historically used during the Portuguese seaborne empire. This term is primarily associated with the pagan communities from the area around the Arafura Sea. Traditionally associated with regions such as Seram, Buru, and the Kei Islands, the Alifuru are considered part of the broader Melanesian cultural and genetic continuum, though many speak Austronesian languages and have integrated aspects of Malay-Indonesian culture.

== Etymology ==
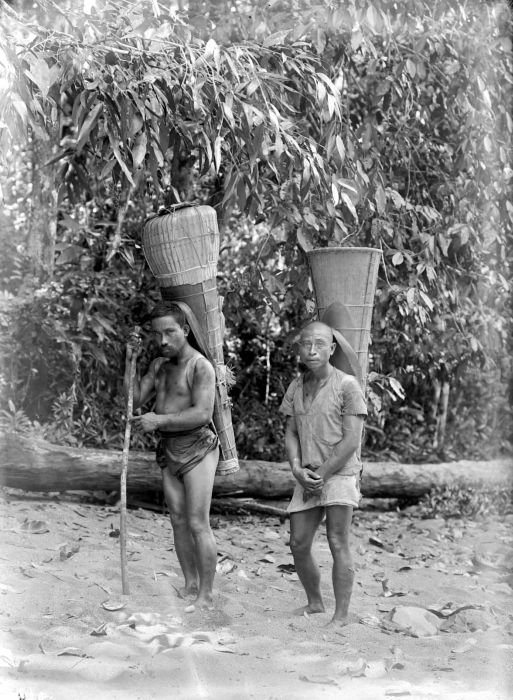
The Alifuru people with traditional rattan bags carrying kopal (copal), unknown date.

Several origins for the term Alfur have been proposed, including from Spanish, Portuguese, and even Arabic. The most likely hypothesis however is that it originated from Tidore halefuru, a compound composed of the stems hale 'land' and furu 'wild, savage'. From Tidore, it was adopted and used by Malay traders, Portuguese, Spanish, and Dutch adventurers and colonists who came to the Spice Islands.

The term referred to certain lands and their inhabitants that were considered "wild, untamed, or pagan", particularly in regions that fell under the influence of Tidore and neighboring Ternate. The term was thus especially used of people in the Maluku Islands (Halmahera, Seram, and Buru among others) and nearby areas of the northern and central parts of Sulawesi. Until the 1900s even Papuans were also often called "Alfur". In 1879, van Musschenbroek, former Resident of Menado, described the use of the term in the following way:

"The general native criterion whether one still is [or is no longer] an Alfur lies in the laying aside of heathenism through the adoption of a monotheistic religion, be it Christianity or Islam. There are thus Alfurs among the most diverse races, both among the Melanesian inhabitants of New Guinea and the true Polynesians of Ceram, as well as among the (Micro?)-nesian Sangirese and the Malayo-Polynesian inhabitants of Celebes."

As with the so-called Indians of South America, the various peoples collectively referred to as Alfurs were not culturally homogeneous. The term Alfur is thus generally claimed to be of no ethnological value, and shortly after the turn of the 20th century it practically disappeared from Dutch administrative and academic writings. The word "Alfuren" continued to be used by German anthropologist Georg Friederici in his works. He used it in a more specific manner to refer to the aborigines or early inhabitants of the Maluku Islands, and by extension to those from the island of Sulawesi.

=== Present-day use ===
In contemporary publications such as a guidebook, "Alfur" is included as a generic name for the indigenous people who still live in the forest and mountain areas on the large islands in Maluku, such as Halmahera and Seram. The use of this term is increasingly narrowing nowadays, Usually the terms "Alfur" or "Alifuru" are used for residents who live in forest and mountain areas who still maintain their old pagan traditions, such as the Alune, Wemale, Nuaulu, Manusela, and others in Seram – which is known as the 'mother island' (Nusa Ina) – who still have a traditional lifestyle and maintain aspects of paganism.

Many of the indigenous people of Maluku are no longer called or do not want to be called "Alfur", which is considered an insulting connotation as "primitive, backward, barbaric, or infidel". Those who live on the coast and in urban areas in the Maluku Islands, and have embraced Abrahamic religions such as Islam and Christianity. They classify themselves more based on where they live, rather than calling themselves Alfur, such as the Ambonese, Haruku, Hitu, Manipa, Luhu, Buano, and others, but still admit that they are descendants of the Alfur who came down from the mountains and moved to the coast.

== Culture ==
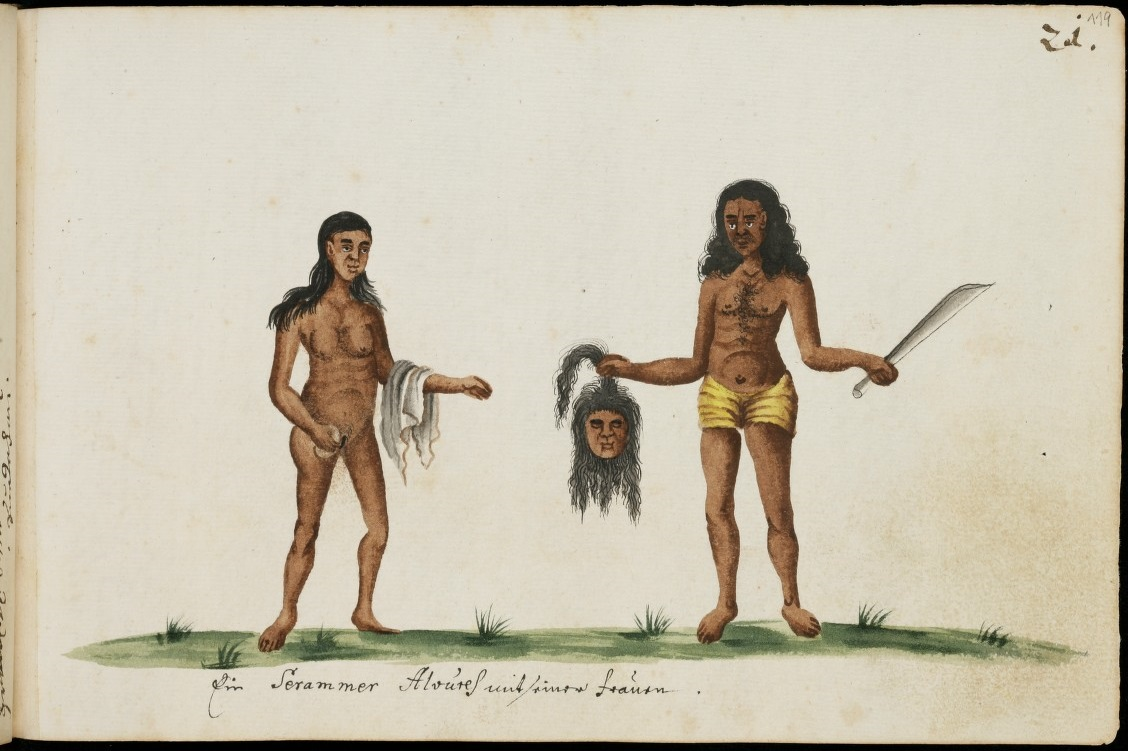
Alifuru people of Seram island, European illustration from the 17th century

Generally these people keep their traditional self-sufficient ways in matters of social organization, food and dress. The women often wear a characteristic funnel-shaped basket like a backpack.

Alfur people usually have little contact with the more urbanized society of coastal towns, which includes the transmigrasi settlers. The Alfur retained a custom of headhunting until the 1940s. Currently, they were under the leadership of chief Ambuk Abah Ampalang (Alfur name).

Alfurs participated in wars such as fights with other tribes to deter enemies from attacking them. They act like soldiers and are armed with machetes, knives, spears, javelin, bows and arrows and muskets for higher-ranking officials. their main armour is leather armor. In some cases, Alfurs seek help from the Wemale people because they are one alliance.

The Alifuru Council claims to represent them to the Indonesian Government.

== See also ==
- Melanesians
- Arafura Sea
- Ambonese
- Maluku Islands
- Manusela
- Nuaulu
- Wemale
- Alune
- Ethnic groups in Indonesia
- Buddhism in Indonesia
