= Hainuwele =

Indonesian mythological figure

- Deity that gave origin to the main vegetable crops
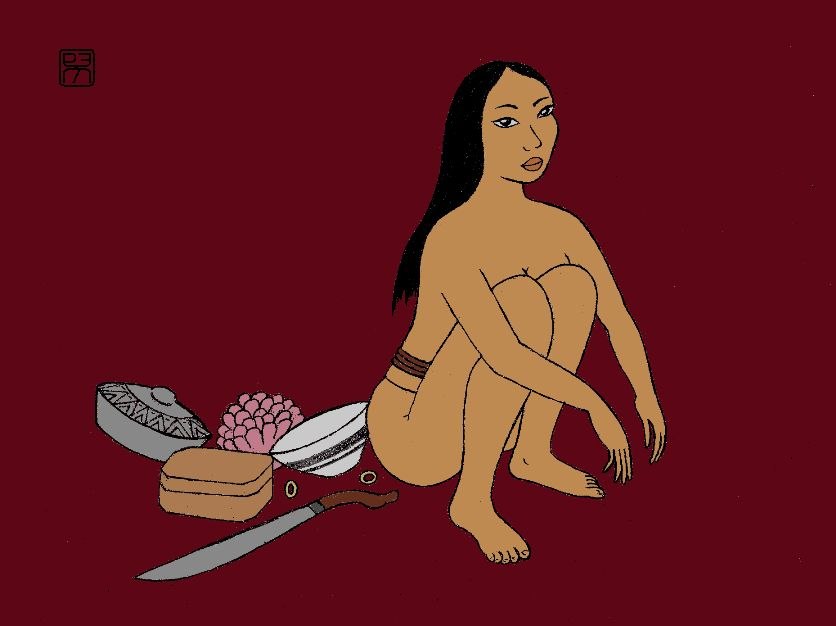
- Hainuwele defecating valuable objects.
- Affiliation: Origin myths, Phosop
- Abode: Seram
- Symbol: Coconut flower
- Mount: none
- Parents: Ameta (Father)

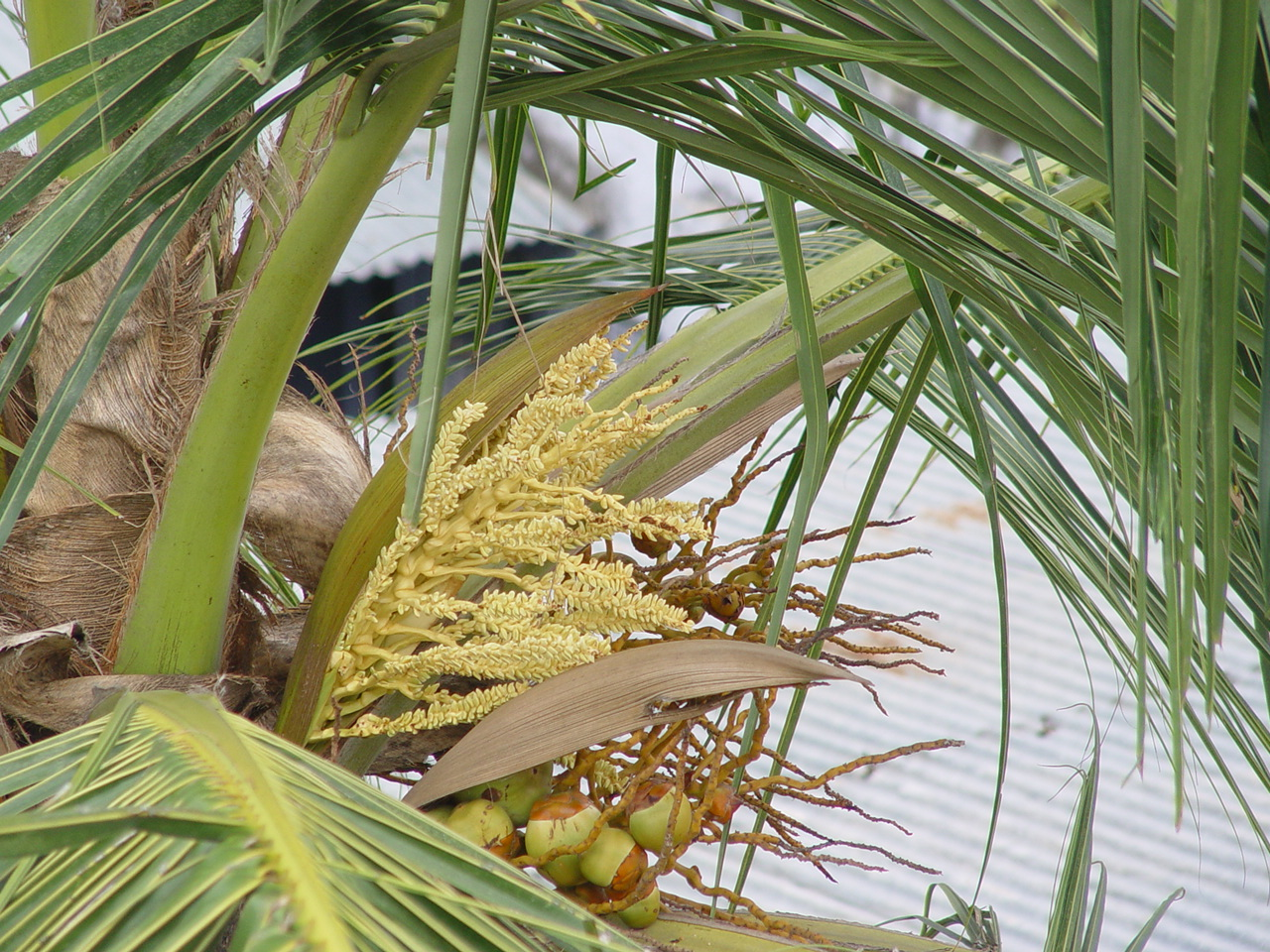
Coconut flower

Hainuwele, "The Coconut Girl", is a figure from the Wemale and Alune folklore of the island of Seram in the Maluku Islands, Indonesia. Her story is an origin myth.

The myth of Hainuwele was recorded by German ethnologist Adolf E. Jensen following the Frobenius Institute's 1937–38 expedition to the Maluku Islands. The study of this myth during his research on religious sacrifice led Jensen to the introduction of the concept of Dema Deity in ethnology.

Joseph Campbell first narrated the Hainuwele legend to an English-speaking audience in his work The Masks of God.

== Myth ==
While hunting one day a man named Ameta found a coconut, something never before seen on Seram, that had been caught in the tusk of a wild boar. Ameta, who was part of one of the original nine families of the West Ceram people who had emerged from bananas, took the coconut home. That night, a figure appeared in a dream and instructed him to plant the coconut. Ameta did so, and in just a few days the coconut grew into a tall tree and bloomed. Ameta climbed the tree to cut the flowers to collect the sap, but in the process slashed his finger and the blood dropped onto a blossom.

Nine days later, Ameta found in the place of this blossom a girl whom he named Hainuwele, meaning "Coconut Branch". He wrapped her in a sarong and brought her home. She grew to maturity with astonishing rapidity. Hainuwele had a remarkable talent: when she defecated she excreted valuable items. Thanks to these, Ameta became very rich.

Hainuwele attended a dance that was to last for nine nights at a place known as Tamene Siwa. In this dance, it was traditional for girls to distribute areca nuts to the men. Hainuwele did so, but when the men asked her for areca nuts, she gave them instead the valuable things which she was able to excrete.

Each day she gave them something bigger and more valuable: golden earrings, coral, porcelain dishes, bush-knives, copper boxes, and gongs. The men were happy at first, but gradually they decided that what Hainuwele was doing was uncanny and, driven by jealousy, they decided to kill her on the ninth night.

In the successive dances, the men circled around the women at the center of the dance ground, Hainuwele amongst them, who handed out gifts. Before the ninth night, the men dug a pit in the center of the dance ground and, singling out Hainuwele, in the course of the dance they pushed her further and further inward until she was pushed right into the pit. The men quickly heaped earth over the girl, covering her cries with their song. Thus Hainuwele was buried alive, while the men kept dancing on the dirt stomping it firmly down.

Ameta, missing Hainuwele, went in search of her. Through an oracle he found out what had happened, then he exhumed her corpse and cut it into pieces which he then re-buried around the village. These pieces grew into various new useful plants, including tubers, giving origin to the principal foods the people of Indonesia have enjoyed ever since.

Ameta brought Hainuwele's cut arms to mulua Satene, the ruling deity over humans. With them, she built for him a gate in spiral shape through which all men should pass. Those who would be able to step across the gate would remain human beings, although henceforward mortal, becoming divided into Patalima (Men of the five) and Patasiwa (Men of the nine). Those unable to pass through the threshold became new kinds of animals or ghosts. Satene herself left the Earth and became ruler over the realm of the dead.

Patasiwa is the group to which both the Wemale and the Alune people belong.

== Analysis and interpretation ==
=== Dema deity myth ===
Hainuwele can be understood as a creation myth in which the natural environment, the daily tasks of men, and the social structures are given meaning. In the myth, spirits and plants are created, and an explanation is provided for the mortality of mankind and the formation of tribal divisions within the Wemale ethnic group. Jensen identifies the Hainuwele figure with a Dema deity.

According to Jensen, the belief in a Dema deity is typical of cultures based on basic plant cultivation as opposed to cultures of hunter-gatherers, as well as complex agricultural cultures such as those based on the cultivation of grain. Jensen identifies the worship of Dema deities in the context of many different cultures worldwide. He assumes that it dates back to the Neolithic Revolution in the early history of mankind. One of the main characteristics of Dema deities is that they are killed by early immortal men (‘Dema’) and hacked to pieces that are strewn about or buried.

Jensen found versions of the basic pattern of what could be defined as "Hainuwele Complex," in which a ritual murder and burial originates the tuberous crops on which people lived, spread throughout Southeast Asia and elsewhere. He contrasted these myths of the first era of agriculture, using root crops, with those in Asia and beyond that explained the origin of rice as coming from a theft from heaven, a pattern of myth found among grain-crop agriculturalists. These delineate two different eras and cultures in the history of agriculture itself.

The earliest one transformed hunting-and-gathering societies' totemistic myths such as we find in Australian Aboriginal cultures, in response to the discovery of food cultivation, and centered on a Dema deity arising from the earth, and the later-developing grain-crop cultures centered on a sky god. Jensen explored the far-reaching culture-historical implications of these and other insights in his later work Myth and Cult among Primitive Peoples, published in 1963.

The worship of a Dema-deity implies that the creation of new life is inevitably attached to the end of life, to death. In light of this fact Jensen indicates that some rituals of the Wemale people, such as the “Maro dance,” include many elements of the Hainuwele myth. Therefore, myth and ritual were structured in a unity of meaning.

Recent research,, however, disputes the use of the term Dema-deity in the context of the Hainuwele story. It disagrees with the definition of the legend as a creation myth, preferring to define it as an origin myth. From the standpoint of cultural morphology, the idea of the Dema-deity is already problematic. Jensen assumes a connection between highly dissimilar myths of different cultures located in areas that are separated by great distances. Moreover, these purported parallels are not supported by archaeological or empirical data.

Additionally, among indigenous people in Seram, there are different versions of the origin myth in which the "magic" woman secretly brought forth foodstuffs, sagu and valuable items from her menstrual blood and/or vagina (i.e., menstruated or born from her vagina rather than defecated)

Some versions suggest the menstrual blood allowed these items to emerge from the earth. When discovered, she turned into the "original" sago starch producing tree (pohon sageru; the sugar palm - Arenga pinnata). This seems partly unusual as Metroxylon sagu is primarily used for starch extraction - one of the most important starch staples of Malukans. Metroxylon also produces palm fronds and leaves for house construction of walls, floorings, and thatch. On the other hand, the Arenga palm is useful to produce sugar, sweet and alcoholic beverages, and sago starch.

=== Social anthropological interpretation ===
The interpretation of the Hainuwele myth has put greater stress on the anthropological aspects. It underlines the fact that, since she had defecated them, the gifts that the generous girl Hainuwele was giving out had an unclean origin and, although useful, they defiled the persons accepting them. The uncanny way in which the material gifts were brought forward points out the reality that all the objects enumerated in the myth were foreign, not produced in Seram, and thus not available on the island before the 16th century.

Alternatively, archaeological evidence from Seram and Ambon among other Malukan islands indicates 11th-14th century Song-Yuan Dynasty stoneware ceramics were quite prevalent; the green glazed Celadons being particularly important in marriage ritual exchanges and dispute settlements.

There are Thai and Vietnamese glazed ceramics from the 14th century onwards, increasing in abundance during the various Ming Gaps in Chinese trade policy and practice. Interestingly, the distribution includes not only coastal port sites (such as Hitu and Hitu Lama on Ambon; or Serapi near Hatusua on Seram), but remote hinterland and highland sites. This indicates the regional and extra-regional value chains included both coastal, port, and inland (highland, hinterland) areas and peoples. Bronze drums and gongs have been available for over 2000 years. Gorom still has an excellent example of a bronze Dongson drum made in Vietnam. Dongson drums were distributed throughout the archipelago and likely related to the spice trade reaching as far as China since at least the Han Dynasty over 2000 years ago where cloves were mandatory for visitors to the court to freshen their breath. Spices from Maluku also made it westward, eventually to the Mideast and Europe well before the European Colonial Period began in the early 16th century (estimated at least to the first and early second millennia CE).

Gold, silver, bronze (especially gongs), glass (bangles and beads), and iron items were also available prior to western colonialism - although mostly traded in rather than locally produced. The small Indo-Pacific bead technology originated from Arikamedu, India over 2000 years ago. The beads, for example, are culturally valuable items still in circulation today. It remains unknown if similar beads were also produced in Southeast Asia (primarily mainland Southeast Asia) using similar technology or possibly artisans and master craftsmen from India. In either case, it demonstrates the length, extent, and inclusion of nested regional to extra-regional value chains.

Pre-colonial Chinese glass bangle fragments were also recovered from radiocarbon dated excavation contexts in Seram in the 1990s (dated to at least the Srivijaya period in the mid to late first millennium CE). Spices (clove, nutmeg and mace) were central to the extra-regional trade and demand. These items were endemic to Maluku and seeking control of the source drove much of Western Colonialism (e.g., the Portuguese dispatched ships to Maluku in 1512 after seizing Melaka in Malaysia in 1511).

Nevertheless, many other items were very important - such as pearls, pearl shell, aromatic woods, birds of paradise feathers, etc. as well as and many foodstuffs such as sago (Metroxylon sagu), kenari (Canarium spp.), palm sugar (Arenga pinnata), fermented palm drinks (sageru; sometimes distilled to make much stronger sopi), tripang, fish, meat, and others.

Hainuwele's variety of presents brought about an element of corruption, bringing about inequality, greed, and jealousy into a roughly homogeneous society, represented by the standard present of areca nuts. Hence the various gifts of the Coconut girl can be interpreted as "dirty money", polluting and degrading everyone who accepts it, bringing about a socioeconomic conflict and the deviation from an ideal state.

Thus, the Hainuwele legend as recorded by Jensen was a myth that sought to rearrange the inconsistencies with which the Wemale were confronted as the elements of change affected their society by trying to bring about agreement of the more recent socioeconomic clash with the older mythical representations.

Following the conflict brought about by the material objects that were obtained through Hainuwele the introduction of mortality among humans became a sort of compensation in order to reintroduce peace with the world of spirits and deities. Thus the Hainuwele myth signals the end of an era and the beginning of another.

Several of these interpretations are highly debatable. Some local versions display generic consistencies but substantial nuanced variations. Numerous interpretations (positive, neutral and negative) can be posited and have been offered by local specialists. Additionally, Jensen's initial translations and interpretations (or subsequent interpretations by others) may be partially erroneous and/or questionably representative of the larger populations and diverse social groups they are meant to portray as a single cultural unit of analysis in parts of Seram Island, Seram Island as a whole, or neighboring islands in Central Maluku.

== See also ==
- Cain and Abel
- Historical ecology
- Maní (Amazonian legend)
- Phosop
- Uke Mochi (Japanese goddess)
