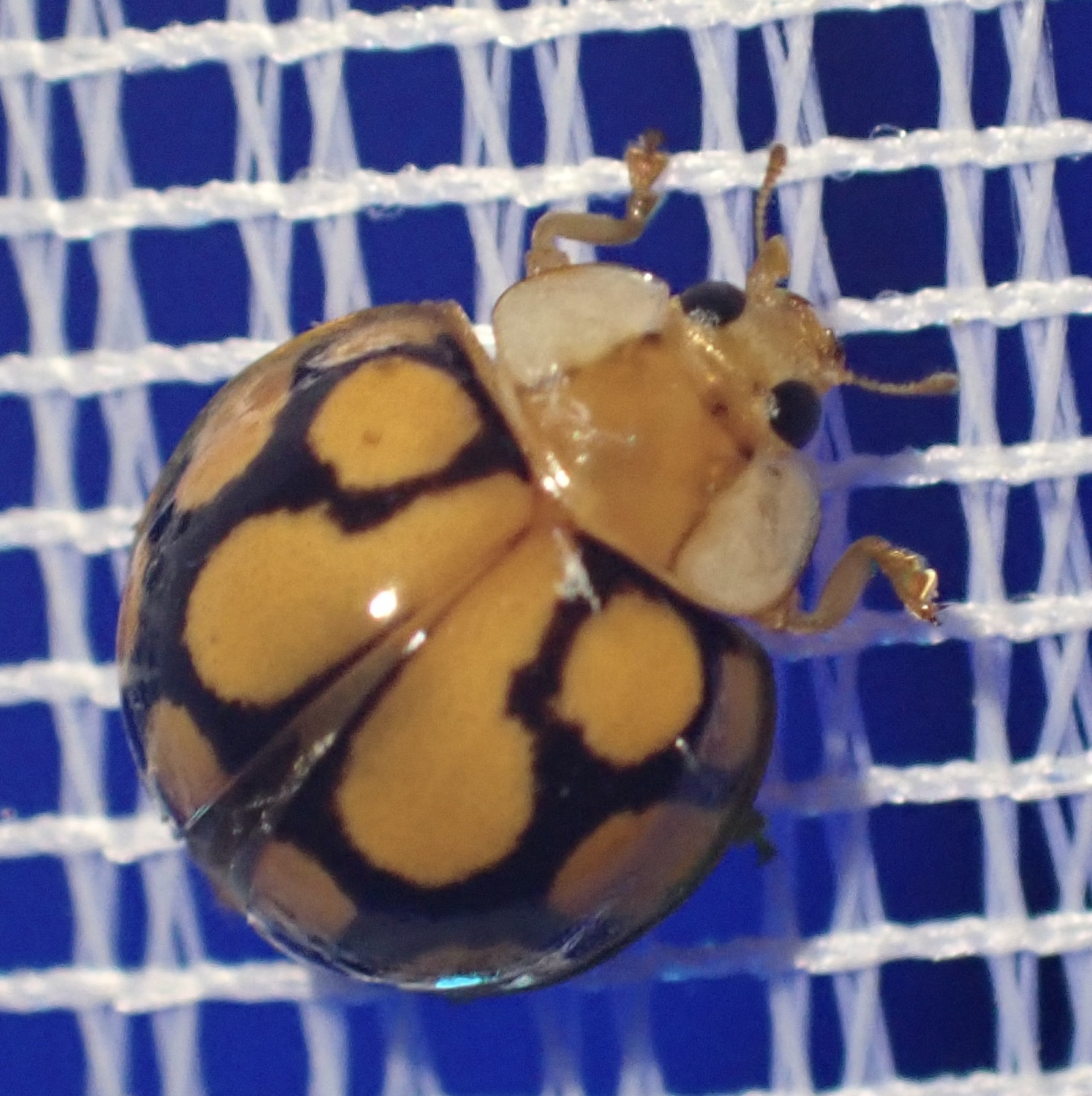

Scientific classification
- Kingdom: Animalia
- Phylum: Arthropoda
- Clade: Pancrustacea
- Class: Insecta
- Order: Coleoptera
- Suborder: Polyphaga
- Infraorder: Cucujiformia
- Family: Coccinellidae
- Genus: Heteroneda
- Species: H. principalis

Binomial name
- Heteroneda principalis (Weise, 1895)

Synonyms
- Callineda principalis Weise, 1895; Lemnia (Microlemnia) gressitti Iablokoff-Khnzorian, 1982

= Heteroneda principalis =

Species of beetle

Heteroneda principalis is a species of beetle of the family Coccinellidae. It is found in Indonesia (Western New Guinea, Kai Islands) and Papua New Guinea.

== Description ==
Adults reach a length of about 6–7.6 mm (0.24–0.30 in). The head and antennae are yellow and the pronotum is yellow with two longitudinal stripes. The scutellum is yellowish and the elytra are yellow or orange, with a black suture and external margins, as well as a black colour pattern.
