= Kingdom of Sahulau =

Asian state

- Early 16th century–19th century
- Status: Vassal state
- Capital: Sahulau
- Religion: Sunni Islam
- Government: Monarchy
- History
  - Established: Early 16th century
  - Ternate conquest of Sahulau: 19th century
  - Disestablished: 19th century
Succeeded by
Sultanate of Ternate
- Today part of: Indonesia

The Kingdom of Sahulau was a kingdom that once ruled in the Elpaputih Bay on the southern part of Seram Island from the 16th to the 19th century. It is believed that the founder of the Kingdom of Sahulau was La Ode Muna, who was the younger brother of the Sultan of Buton, Murhum. The King of Sahulau held the title "Hena Mese Ina Nusa Nusa Rata Sahulau Samasuru Amalatu Kabasaran".

The Kingdom of Sahulau's capital was located in Sahulau. The population of the Kingdom of Sahulau consisted of the Wemale and Buton. From the 16th to the 17th century, Sahulau engaged in ceramic trade with merchants from China as well as Bugis and Makassar traders. Sahulau also established trade agreements and friendly relations with the Dutch.

== Establishment ==
The Kingdom of Sahulau was one of the kingdoms established in the territory of the Wemale people, who originated from a place called Tamene Siwa. However, the development of Sahulau into the Kingdom of Sahulau was influenced by the presence of migrant settlers. Local folklore believes that the first king of Sahulau was the son of the Sultan of Buton, who had been exiled from Buton and became a settler in the southern part of Seram Island. Upon arriving on Seram Island, he successfully mediated a civil war near his place of residence. As a result, he was rewarded and honored by the local people, who allowed him to establish a village and granted him the right to lead it. The newly established village was located in the mountainous area that is now Sahulau. This village later grew into a kingdom known as the Kingdom of Sahulau.

Based on archaeological findings, the Kingdom of Sahulau was estimated to have been established in the 16th century. It was also believed that the founder of Sahulau was La Ode Muna. He was the younger brother of Sultan Murhum, the first sultan of the Sultanate of Buton, who ruled in the 16th century. Historical records state that La Ode Muna was exiled from Buton as punishment for committing Sexual intercourse with his own mother.

== Government and territory ==
Sahulau was led by a king. The title bestowed upon the King of Sahulau was "Hena Mese Ina Nusa Nusa Rata Sahulau Samasuru Amalatu Kabasaran". The authority of the Kingdom of Sahulau covered the bay area in the southern part of Seram Island. The kingdom's central territory was located in Sahulau, which is now situated on the border between Central Maluku Regency and the eastern part of West Seram Regency.

== Population and political relations ==
The population of the Kingdom of Sahulau consisted of the Wemale as the indigenous inhabitants and the Butonese as migrants. Sahulau established trade agreements and friendly relations with foreign nations, especially the Dutch. In addition, the Kingdom of Sahulau engaged in ceramic trade with merchants from China as well as traders from the Bugis and Makassar in what is now South Sulawesi. The ceramic trade in the territory of the Kingdom of Sahulau is estimated to have taken place from the 6th to the 17th century.

== Decline ==
Based on archaeological findings, the decline of Sahulau is estimated to have occurred in the 19th century. The Kingdom of Sahulau came to an end after its territory was conquered by Ternate. After its fall, the ruler over the former territory of the Kingdom of Sahulau was appointed by the Sultan of Ternate. The highest-ranking authority was a royal representative known as a kolano.
