= Heteroneda mimetica =

Scientific classification
- Kingdom: Animalia
- Phylum: Arthropoda
- Clade: Pancrustacea
- Class: Insecta
- Order: Coleoptera
- Suborder: Polyphaga
- Infraorder: Cucujiformia
- Family: Coccinellidae
- Genus: Heteroneda
- Species: H. mimetica

Binomial name
- Heteroneda mimetica Chazeau, 1990

Species of beetle

Heteroneda mimetica is a species of beetle of the family Coccinellidae. It is found in Indonesia (Western New Guinea, Kai Islands) and Papua New Guinea.

== Description ==
Adults reach a length of about 5.2–5.7 mm (0.20–0.22 in). The frons and antennae are yellow and the pronotum is yellow with two longitudinal stripes. The scutellum is black and the elytra are yellow or orange, with longitudinal and transverse stripes and with the external borders and suture black.
