= Alune people =

Ethnic group of Seram Island, Indonesia

Alune people Sapalewa people / Sapolewa people
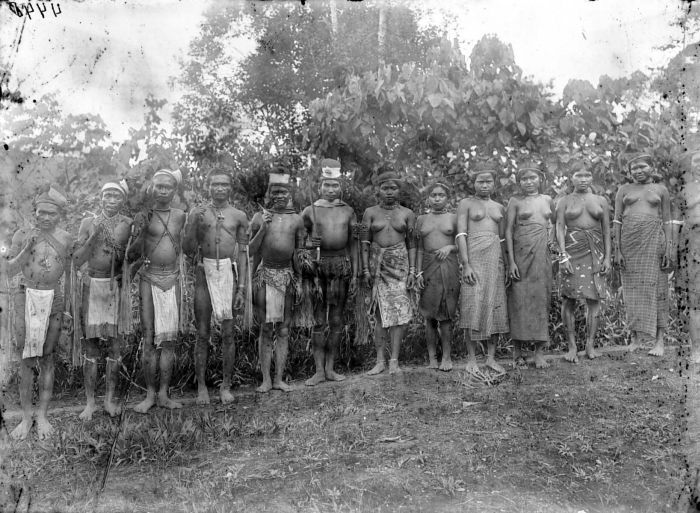
- A group of men and women of Ahiolo.

Total population
- 21,300

Regions with significant populations
- Indonesia (Seram Island)

Languages
- Alune language (Malayo-Polynesian), Indonesian language

Religion
- Christianity (predominantly), Islam, Animism

Related ethnic groups
- Wemale people

The Alune (sometimes Sapalewa or Sapolewa) people are one of the long-established ethnic groups of Seram Island, Indonesia. They number about 21,300 and live in 27 villages of the western-central area of the island. Like the Wemale, they originated in a common group called Patasiwa.

The Alune speak a language of Malayo-Polynesian origin. It is also known as Sapalewa or Patasiwa Alfoeren and, despite the small number of speakers, it has a few dialects. The most prestigious dialect is the Rambatu speech variety. The Hainuwele legend is an origin myth from the Alune and Wemale folklore. It was recorded by German ethnologist Adolf Ellegard Jensen in a 1937–8 expedition to the Maluku Islands.

== Description ==
Like other ancient human groups living in interior Seram, the Alune traditionally lived off forest products. Their diet was based on the sago palm and they also practiced shifting cultivation.

Both men and women wore little clothing because of the humid environment. In daily life the Alune adults had a short loincloth from the waist down made of bark-fibre, similar to the Polynesian tapa cloth. This loincloth reached above the knees and it often had decorative patterns. Women wore also necklaces.

On special occasions, Alune men wore elaborate warrior clothes and carried long swords. The Alune males used to engage in warrior activities against neighboring groups. Women used to spend most of their day collecting products from the forest children often accompanied them.

As with the Wemale, the coming of age celebration for Alune girls was an important occasion.

Like the Wemale, the Alune were also skilled carpenters. The ancestral Alune houses were large and elaborate and built of wood, sticks and palm leaves.

The Alune culture and lifestyle has changed very much during the last few decades because of the impact of consumerism. Also the political and religious restlessness and the resulting conflict in Indonesia affected many islands of the Maluku area.

== See also ==
- Alfur people
- Hainuwele
