= Dema Deity =

Archetype in mythology and ethnology

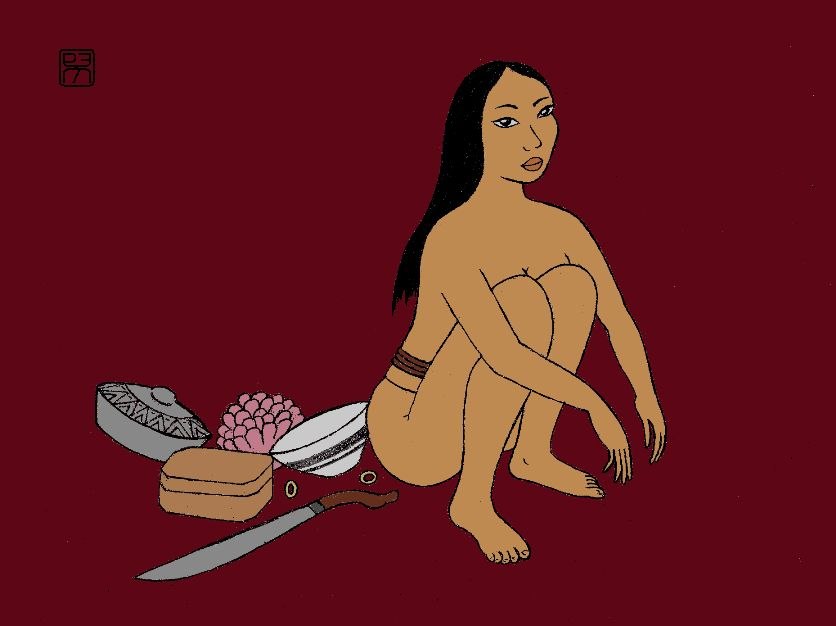
Hainuwele, whose dismembered body gave origin to various edible plants

Dema Deity is a concept introduced by Adolf Ellegard Jensen following his research on religious sacrifice. Jensen was a German ethnologist who furthered the theory of Cultural Morphology founded by Leo Frobenius.

== Description ==
The term dema comes from the Marind people of southwest Papua and has been used to refer to similar concepts in Melanesian religion and elsewhere.

Dema Deities are mythological figures who have given to certain peoples their land, food-crops, totems, and knowledge such as how to cultivate crops, raise poultry, make boats, perform dances, and perform sacred rituals. In some cases, such as in the Hainuwele myth of Seram Island recorded by Jensen, it is claimed that from their dismembered bodies, blood, etc., came the different communities that are now in existence, together with their territory.

Both local culture and natural environment remain infused with the supernatural power of these creative deities.

== Examples ==
- Cronus, from Greek mythology
- Osiris, from Egyptian religion
- Pangu, from Chinese mythology
- Ukemochi, from Shinto religion
- Tiamat, from Babylonian mythology
- Ymir, from Norse mythology
- Purusha, from Hindu mythology
- Dewi Sri, from Indonesian mythology

== See also ==
- Culture hero
- Myth of origins
- Religious experience
