= Folklore of the Moluccas =

The folklore of the Moluccas are legends that are believed to be sacred and mystical, which reflect the culture and lives of the indigenous people of the island of Moluccas. Moluccas folklore includes such characters as Nenek Luhu, Batu Badaong, Bulu Pamali, Suanggi, Legenda Tanifai, Buaya Tembaga, Petualangan Empat Kapiten and several others. While the folklore of the North Moluccas include Batu Belah, and Asal Mula Telaga Biru.
