= Docimocaria aruensis =

Scientific classification
- Kingdom: Animalia
- Phylum: Arthropoda
- Clade: Pancrustacea
- Class: Insecta
- Order: Coleoptera
- Suborder: Polyphaga
- Infraorder: Cucujiformia
- Family: Coccinellidae
- Genus: Docimocaria
- Species: D. aruensis

Binomial name
- Docimocaria aruensis (Crotch, 1874)

Synonyms
- Coelophora aruensis Crotch, 1874

Species of beetle

Docimocaria aruensis is a species of beetle of the family Coccinellidae. It is found in Indonesia (Western New Guinea, Aru).

== Description ==
Adults reach a length of about 8.7–9.5 mm (0.34–0.37 in). The head and antennae are yellow and the pronotum is black with orange-red patches. The elytra are black, with reddish humeral and apical patches, while the borders and suture are black. The scutellum is red medially, with black borders. The ventral surface is mostly black.
