= Banda language (Maluku) =

Austronesian language spoken in Maluku, Indonesia

Banda
- Native to: Indonesia
- Region: Kei Islands, formerly Banda Islands
- Native speakers: (3,000 cited 1987)
- Language family: Austronesian: Malayo-Polynesian; Central–Eastern; Banda

Language codes
- ISO 639-3: bnd
- Glottolog: band1355

Banda is an Austronesian language of the Central Maluku subgroup. Along with Kei, it is one of the two languages of the Kei Islands in the Indonesian province of Maluku.

Originally, the Banda language was spoken on the Banda Islands until the Dutch military campaign in 1621, during which almost all indigenous inhabitants were killed, enslaved or exiled. Survivors of the campaign found refuge on the island of Kei Besar, where the language is still in active use in the villages Banda Elat and Banda Eli.

== Phonology ==
Consonants
	Labial	Alveolar	Palatal	Velar
Plosive	p b	t d		k
Fricative	f	s		
Nasal	m	n	ɲ	ŋ
Approximant	w	r, l	j	

Vowels
	Front	Central	Back
High	i		u
Mid	e		o
Low		a	
