= Heteroneda grata =

Scientific classification
- Kingdom: Animalia
- Phylum: Arthropoda
- Clade: Pancrustacea
- Class: Insecta
- Order: Coleoptera
- Suborder: Polyphaga
- Infraorder: Cucujiformia
- Family: Coccinellidae
- Genus: Heteroneda
- Species: H. grata

Binomial name
- Heteroneda grata (Iablokoff-Khnzorian, 1982)

Synonyms
- Lemnia grata Iablokoff-Khnzorian, 1982

Species of beetle

Heteroneda grata is a species of beetle of the family Coccinellidae. It is found in Indonesia (Western New Guinea) and Papua New Guinea.

== Description ==
Adults reach a length of about 3.8–6.3 mm (0.15–0.25 in). The head and antennae are orange-yellow and the pronotum is usually yellow with two black patches at the base. The scutellum and elytra are black, the latter with reddish patches.
