= Heteroneda =

Scientific classification
- Kingdom: Animalia
- Phylum: Arthropoda
- Clade: Pancrustacea
- Class: Insecta
- Order: Coleoptera
- Suborder: Polyphaga
- Infraorder: Cucujiformia
- Family: Coccinellidae
- Subfamily: Coccinellinae
- Tribe: Coccinellini
- Genus: Heteroneda; Crotch, 1871

Genus of beetles

Heteroneda is a genus of beetles belonging to the family Coccinellidae.

== Species ==
- Heteroneda billardieri
- Heteroneda grata
- Heteroneda mimetica
- Heteroneda principalis
