= Docimocaria =

Scientific classification
- Kingdom: Animalia
- Phylum: Arthropoda
- Clade: Pancrustacea
- Class: Insecta
- Order: Coleoptera
- Suborder: Polyphaga
- Infraorder: Cucujiformia
- Family: Coccinellidae
- Subfamily: Coccinellinae
- Tribe: Coccinellini
- Genus: Docimocaria; Crotch, 1874

Synonyms
- Antineda Iablokoff-Khnzorian, 1982

Genus of beetles

Docimocaria is a genus of beetles belonging to the family Coccinellidae.

== Species ==
- Docimocaria aruensis
- Docimocaria commingii
- Docimocaria insignis
- Docimocaria princeps
- Docimocaria pulchra
