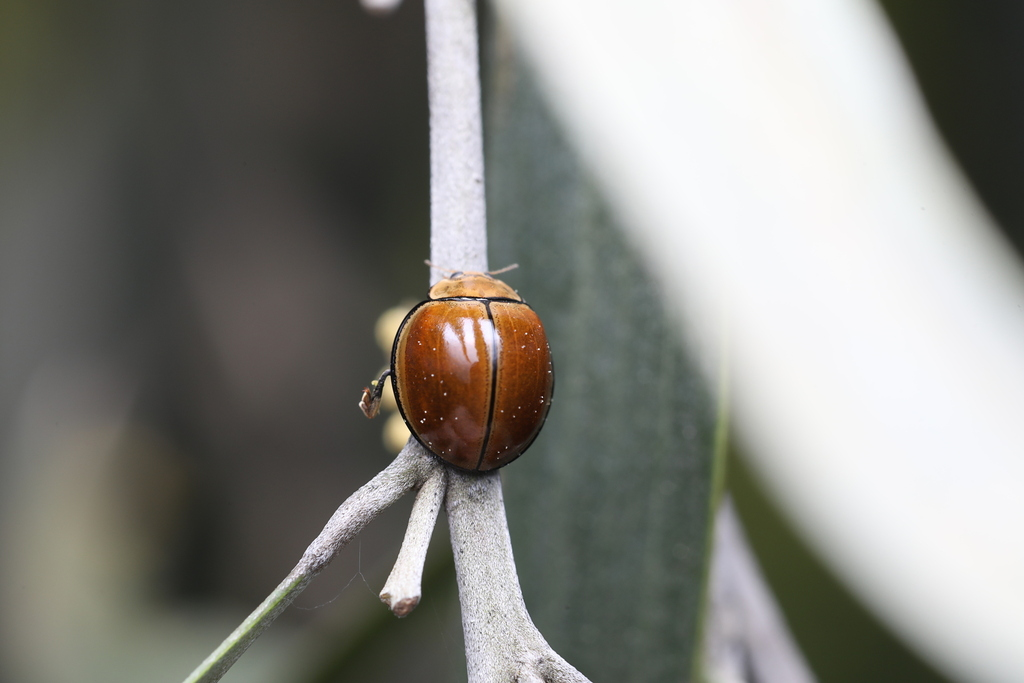

Scientific classification
- Kingdom: Animalia
- Phylum: Arthropoda
- Clade: Pancrustacea
- Class: Insecta
- Order: Coleoptera
- Suborder: Polyphaga
- Infraorder: Cucujiformia
- Family: Coccinellidae
- Genus: Docimocaria
- Species: D. princeps

Binomial name
- Docimocaria princeps (Mulsant, 1850)

Synonyms
- Neda princeps Mulsant, 1850

= Docimocaria princeps =

Species of beetle

Docimocaria princeps is a species of beetle of the family Coccinellidae. It is found in northern and north-eastern Australia.

== Description ==
Adults reach a length of about 8.5–9 mm (0.33–0.35 in). The head and antennae are orange-yellow, while the pronotum is orange-yellow with black lateral and basal borders. The scutellum is pale with dark borders, but may be completely black in some specimens. The elytra are orange-yellow, with black lateral and anterior borders and suture. The ventral surface is mostly yellow.
