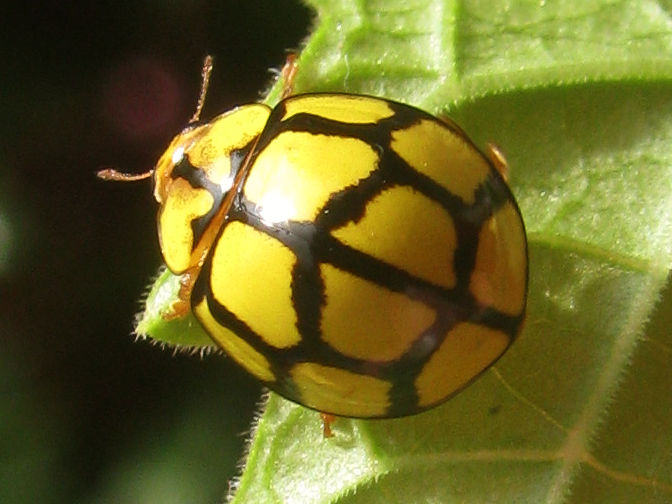

Scientific classification
- Kingdom: Animalia
- Phylum: Arthropoda
- Clade: Pancrustacea
- Class: Insecta
- Order: Coleoptera
- Suborder: Polyphaga
- Infraorder: Cucujiformia
- Family: Coccinellidae
- Genus: Heteroneda
- Species: H. billardieri

Binomial name
- Heteroneda billardieri Crotch, 1871

Synonyms
- Coccinella reticulata Fabricius, 1801 (preocc.)

= Heteroneda billardieri =

Species of beetle

Heteroneda billardieri, the netty ladybird or yellow netted ladybeetle, is a species of beetle of the family Coccinellidae. Its range extends from India, Singapore and Myanmar to Indonesia and the Philippines.

== Description ==
Adults reach a length of about 7 mm (0.28 in). They are bright lemon yellow, the pronotum with a black stripe connected to a black marking on the posterior margin and the elytra with a yellow and black pattern.

== Biology ==
They have been recorded feeding on aphids, planthoppers and psyllids.
