= Adolf Ellegard Jensen =

German ethnologist (1899–1965)

- Born: 1 January 1899; Kiel
- Died: 20 May 1965 (aged 66); Mammolshain
- Scientific career
- Fields: Ethnology

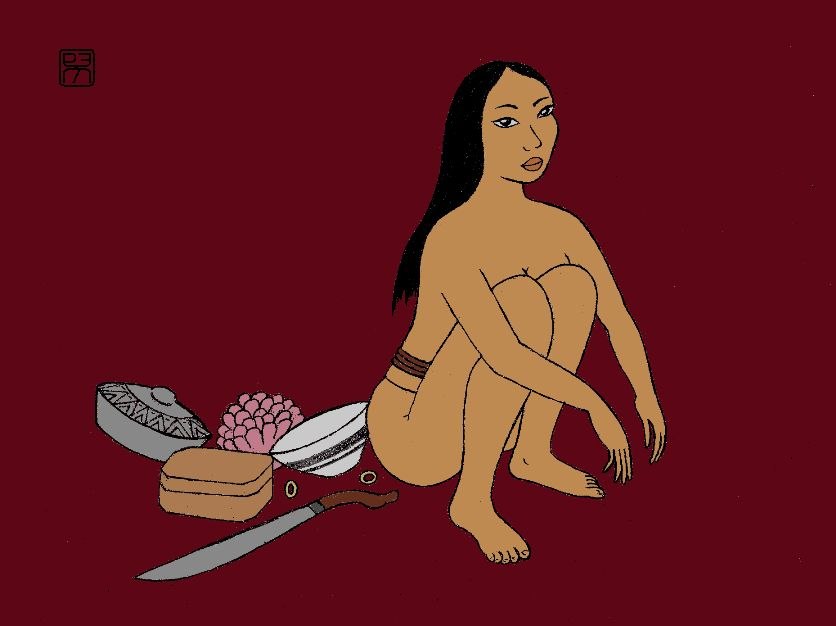
The Hainuwele myth of Seram Island was recorded by Jensen during an expedition to the Moluccas.

Adolf Ellegard Jensen (1 January 1899 – 20 May 1965) was one of the most important German ethnologists of the first half of the 20th century.

Jensen's main research interests were myth, ritual and cult. He furthered the theory of Cultural Morphology founded by Leo Frobenius. Jensen is mostly known for his research on religious sacrifice that led him to the introduction of the concept of Dema Deity. His best-known work is 'Myth and Cult Among Primitive Peoples', published in 1951.

== Life ==
Jensen studied physics in Kiel and in Bonn, concluding his studies with a dissertation on Max Planck and Ernst Mach in 1922. One year later he became acquainted with Leo Frobenius and became his faithful disciple. As a member of the Institute for Cultural Morphology founded by Frobenius and known today as Frobenius Institute, Jensen took part in research journeys to South Africa, Libya, Southern Ethiopia and Seram Island in the Moluccas. He became a full-time ethnologist after publishing a paper on circumcision and rite of passage ceremonies. He held a teaching position at the University of Frankfurt beginning in 1925.

During the Third Reich Jensen was chosen to be appointed to lead the Frobenius Institute, also known as Institute for Cultural Morphology, as well as Frankfurt's Museum of Ethnology (Museum für Völkerkunde) after Frobenius' death in 1938. However, his appointment fell through owing to the opposition of the Nazi authorities, who also withdrew his Venia legendi in the University of Frankfurt, for Jensen had not divorced his Jewish wife. Finally in 1945, after Nazi Germany's defeat in World War II, Jensen was appointed Director of the Frobenius Institute, as well as Director of Frankfurt's Museum of Ethnology. He would keep both posts until his death.

Together with fellow ethnologist Franz Termer, Jensen reestablished the German Anthropological Association (Deutsche Gesellschaft für Völkerkunde) which he led between 1947 and 1954. This organization had to be established anew during the postwar reconstruction of West Germany.

Along with Frobenius himself, Jensen is one of the most important representatives of the Cultural Morphology viewpoint. At the center of his theoretical work stood the concepts of 'emotion' (Ergriffenheit), 'expression' (Ausdruck) and 'application' (Anwendung), which he sought to identify in the religious manifestations of indigenous people groups. His criticism was directed mainly against cultural evolutionism, as well as some other theories in ethnology and anthropology. He argued against those scholars who sustained that there is a "primitive mentality" distinct from modern methods of thought.

Jensen is renowned for having introduced the concept of 'Dema deity', a term that he took from the language of the Marind-anim people of New Guinea, in ethnology. According to Jensen the belief in a Dema deity is typical of cultures based on basic plant cultivation as opposed to cultures of hunter-gatherers, as well as complex agricultural cultures such as those based on the cultivation of grain. Jensen identifies the veneration of Dema deities in the context of many different cultures worldwide. He assumes that it dates back to the Neolithic Revolution in the early history of mankind. One of the main characteristics of Dema deities is that they are killed by the men of their community and hacked to pieces which are strewn about or buried: from their dismembered bodies the staple agricultural products grow forth.

Jensen developed this concept through the Hainuwele legend, an important origin myth from the folklore of the Wemale people in Seram that he himself recorded. This myth was recorded by Jensen along with many other myths of the oral tradition of the Maluku Islands during a 1937–8 Frobenius Institute expedition.

Jensen also made important contributions to the ethnography of Southern Ethiopia during his travels in 1951 and 1955. He died shortly after he retired in 1965.

== Work ==
- Beschneidung und Reifezeremonien bei Naturvölkern. Strecker & Schröder, Stuttgart 1933
- Im Lande des Gada. Wanderungen zwischen Volkstrümmern Südabessiniens. Strecker & Schröder, Stuttgart 1936
- Hainuwele. Volkserzählungen von der Molukken-Insel Ceram. Klostermann, Frankfurt 1939
- Die drei Ströme. Züge aus dem geistigen und religiösen Leben der Wemale, einem Primitiv-Volk in den Molukken. Harrassowitz, Leipzig 1948
- Das religiöse Weltbild einer frühen Kultur. Schröder, Stuttgart 1948. Newly edited as: Die getötete Gottheit. Weltbild einer frühen Kultur. Kohlhammer Verlag, Stuttgart 1966
- Mythos und Kult bei Naturvölkern. Religionswissenschaftliche Betrachtungen. Steiner, Wiesbaden 1951, NA 1960, 1991
- As editor: Altvölker Süd-Äthiopiens. Kohlhammer Verlag, Stuttgart 1959

== Bibliography ==
- Hans Fuchs: Die Religions-und Kulturtheorie Ad.E. Jensens und ihre geistesgeschichtlichen Wurzeln unter besonderer Berücksichtigung des Opferrituals. Eine geistesgeschichtliche Studie. Aachen 1999
- Jeffrey Carter (editor), Understanding Religious Sacrifice: A Reader. (Controversies in the Study of Religion). Continuum, 2003, ISBN 978-0826448798

== See also ==
- Cult (religious practice)
