= Wemale people =

Ethnic group of Seram Island, Indonesia

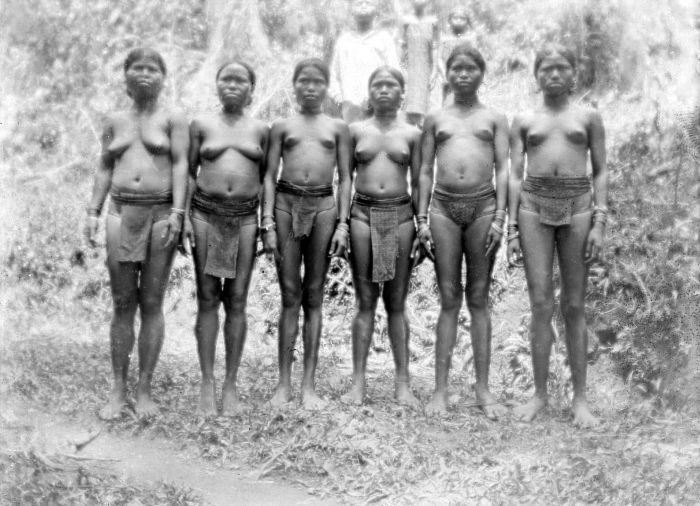

Total population
- 7,500

Regions with significant populations
- Indonesia (Seram Island, Moluccan Islands)

Languages
- Wemale language (weo); Classification: Malayo-Polynesian, Indonesian language

Religion
- Christianity, Animism

Related ethnic groups
- Alune people

The Wemale people are an ethnic group of Seram Island, Indonesia. They number over 7,500 and live in 39 villages of the central area of the island. Like the Alune people in the west, the Wemale people originate from a common ancestral group called the Patasiwa.

The Wemale language is of Malayo-Polynesian origin and it is divided into a northern and a southern variety, having dialects known as Horale, Kasieh, Uwenpantai, Honitetu and Kawe. Northern Wemale is spoken by about 5,000 people and the Southern Wemale is spoken by about 3,700 people. The Hainuwele legend is an origin myth from the Wemale and Alune folklore. It was recorded by German ethnologist Adolf Ellegard Jensen in a 1937–1938 expedition to the Maluku Islands.

== Description ==
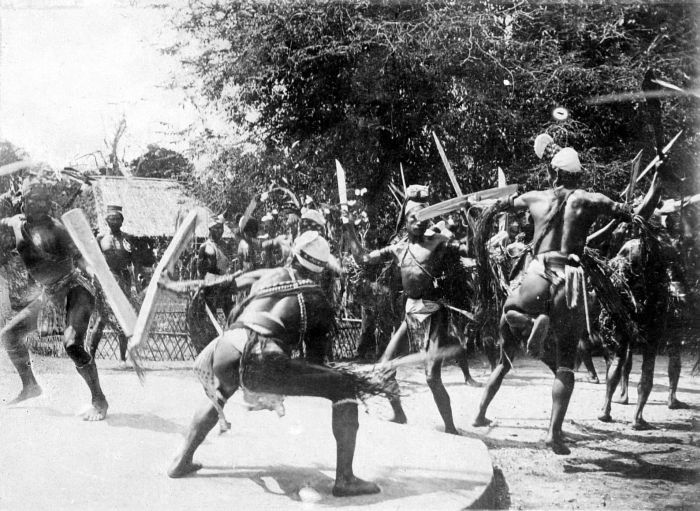
Wemale warriors.

Traditionally the Wemale lived off forest products. Much of their diet was based on the sago palm. They also practiced shifting cultivation.

Males used to engage in warrior activities against neighboring groups. Females used to spend most of their day collecting products from the forest in tall conical baskets that they carried on their backs. The top of these baskets had a characteristic funnel-shape and whatever was caught was tossed inside by the women with a swift and graceful movement.

The Wemale men carried long knives. Both sexes wore little clothing because of the humid environment. Women wore rattan girdles around their waist.

Same as with the Alune, the coming of age celebration for girls was an important occasion.

The Wemale built large and elaborate houses with wood, sticks and palm leaves. These houses were very skillfully built in order to keep the interior dry and comfortable.

The culture of the Wemale people has changed very much during the last few decades because of the impact of consumerism upsetting traditional values. Also the political and religious restlessness and the resulting conflict in Indonesia affected many islands of the Maluku area.

== See also ==
- Alfur people
- Hainuwele

== Bibliography ==
- Sachse, F. J. P., Het Eiland Seram en zijne Bewoners. Leiden, 1907
- Adolf Ellegard Jensen, Die drei Ströme. Züge aus dem geistigen und religiösen Leben der Wemale, einem Primitiv-Volk in den Molukken. Leipzig 1948
