= Kai Besar =

Island in Maluku, Indonesia

Coordinates: 5.40°S 133.1°E

- The Kai Islands, with Kai Besar in the east

- Location on a map of the Maluku Islands

Geography
- Location: Southeast Asia
- Archipelago: Kai Islands

Administration
- Indonesia
- Province: Maluku

Additional information
- Time zone: IEST (UTC+09:00)

Kai Besar (Great Kai Island, also Nuhu Yuut or Nusteen) is one of the Kai Islands which are part of the Maluku Islands, Indonesia. Its area is 550 km^{2} (210 mi^{2}). The other main island in the Kai Islands group is Kai Kecil (Little Kai Island). The northern tip is called Tanjung Borang, and southern tip called Tanjung Weduar.

Approximately 10% of the population is Wandan, descendants of residents of the Banda Islands who fled the Dutch genocide, and who still speak the original language.
