= Kai Kecil =

Island of Maluku Islands, Indonesia

Kai Kecil (Nuhu Roa)
- The Kai Islands. Kai Kecil is west of Kai Besar in the east.

- Location in Maluku

Geography
- Location: Southeast Asia
- Coordinates: 5°45′S 132°40′E
- Archipelago: Kai Islands

Administration
- Indonesia
- Province: Maluku

Additional information
- Time zone: IEST (UTC+09:00)

Pulau Kai Kecil (Little Stone Island), also known as Nuhu Roa, is a part of the Kai Islands group of the Maluku Islands in west Indonesia. The island has an area of 399 km^{2} (154 sq mi).

Kai Kecil has white sand beaches such as Pasir Panjang, which is 17 kilometres (11 miles) from the city of Tual, and Ohoideertawun. Other remote beaches include Ohio Lilir Beach and Ngurtaur Beach. The island also has large caves, including Gua Luwat (Luwat Cave) which has unusual paintings.
