= Kai Islands =

Island group of Indonesia

Native name: Kepulauan Kai
- The Kai Islands

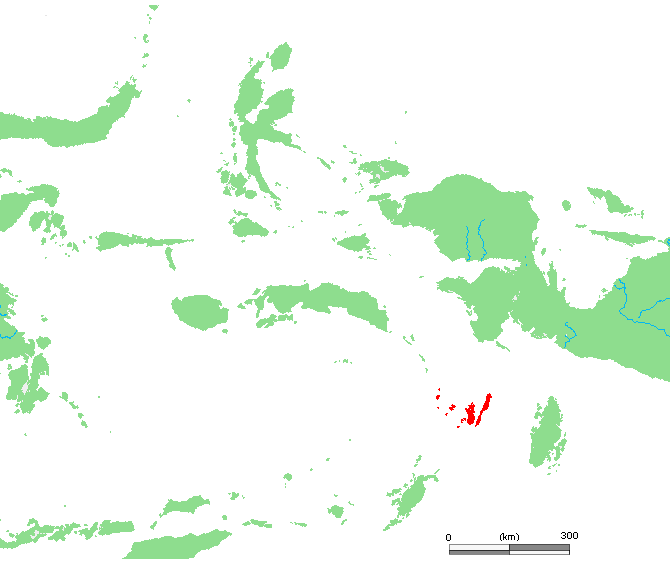

Geography
- Location: Southeast Asia
- Coordinates: 5.75°S 132.73°E
- Total islands: 47
- Major islands: Kai Besar, Kai Kecil
- Area: 1,286.2 km^{2} (496.6 sq mi)
- Highest elevation: 890 m (2920 ft)

Administration
- Indonesia
- Province: Maluku
- Largest settlement: Tual

Demographics
- Population: 219,705 (mid 2024 estimate)

Additional information
- Time zone: WIT (UTC+09:00)

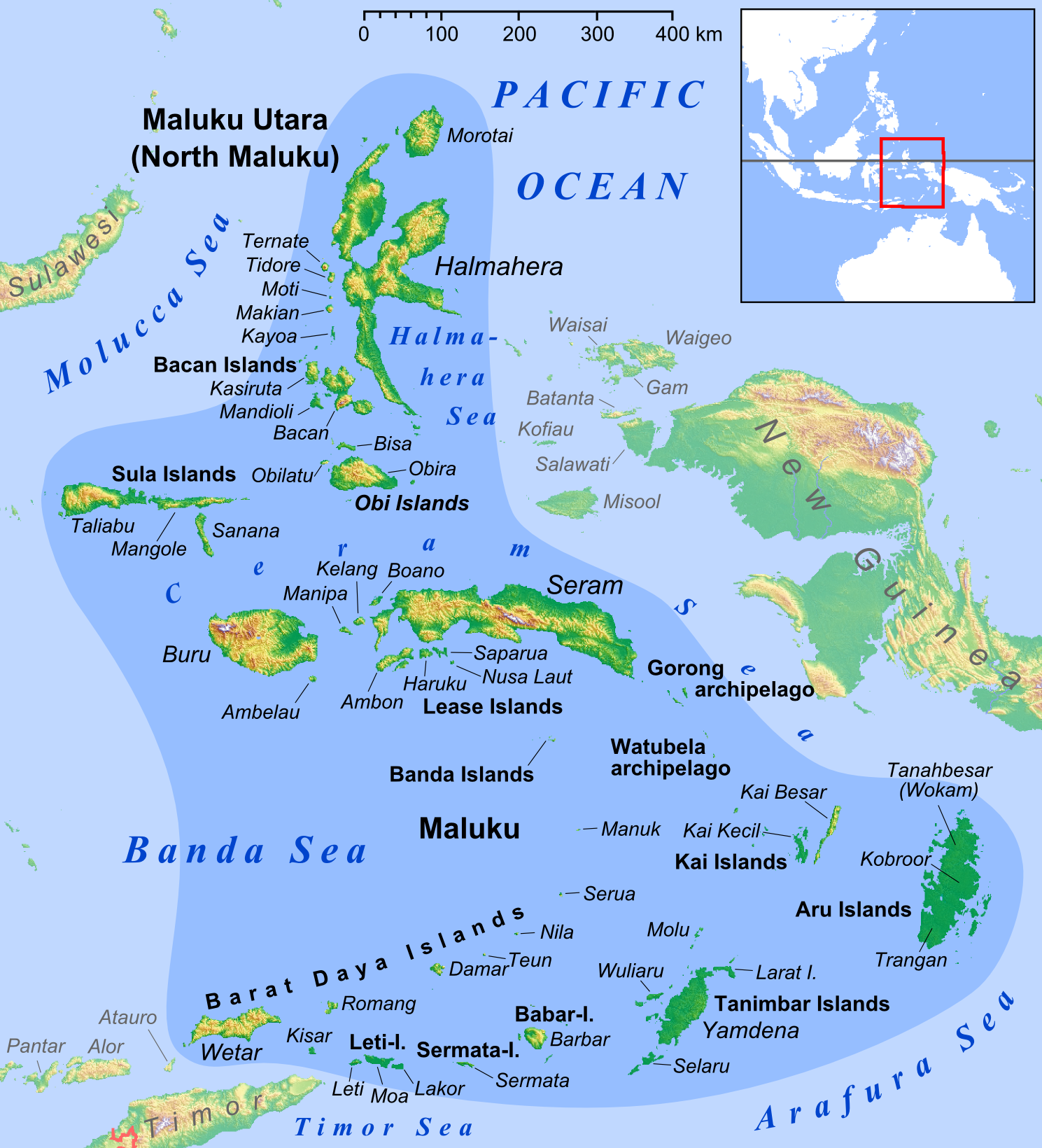
Kai Islands in the east of Maluku Islands

The Kai Islands (also Kei Islands) of Indonesia are a group of islands in the southeastern part of the Maluku Islands, located in the province of Maluku. The Moluccas have been known as the Spice Islands due to regionally specific plants such as nutmeg, mace, and cloves that originally intrigued the European nations of the 16th century. The coastal zone of the islands are identified as a site of highest marine biodiversity importance in the Coral Triangle.

== Geography ==
The Kai Islands are a part of the Wallacea, the group of Indonesian islands that are separated by deep water from both the Asian and Australian continental shelves, and were never linked to either continent. As a result, the Kai Islands have few native mammals and are a part of the Banda Sea Islands moist deciduous forests ecoregion. Kai Besar in particular is mountainous and densely forested. Kai is famous for the beauty of its beaches, notably in Pasir Panjang.

The indigenous inhabitants call the islands Nuhu Evav (Evav Islands) or Tanat Evav (Evav Land), but they are known as Kai to people from neighboring islands. The islands are on the edge of the Banda Sea, south of the Bird's Head Peninsula of New Guinea, west of the Aru Islands, and northeast of the Tanimbar Islands.

The Kai islands are made up of numerous islands, including:

Within southeast Maluku Regency:

- Kai Besar or Nuhu Yuut or Nusteen (Great Kai)
- Kai Kecil or Nuhu Roa or Nusyanat (Little Kai)
- Tanimbar Kai or Tnebar Evav

Within the city of Tual:

- Kai Dulah or Du
- Dulah Laut or Du Roa
- Kuur
- Taam
- Tayandu Islands (Tahayad)

The Kai Islands' total land area is 1,286.2 km^{2} (496.6 sq mi) and had a population of 154,524 at the 2010 Census, including the independent city of Tual; the 2020 Census gave a figure of 209,791. By mid-2024 this had increased to an officially estimated 219,705.

== Climate ==
The Kai Islands reside in a topical zone in close proximity to the equator, leading to an average temperature of 30 °C (86 °F), and an average low of 18 °C (64 °F). During the months from April to September, the islands experience a dry season where rain is scarce.

=== Environmental concerns ===
A report by the United Nations Intergovernmental Panel on Climate Change (IPCC) identified an acceleration in the rate of sea level rising, potentially causing the Indonesian islands to sink. This scenario could also lead to changes in Indonesia's territorial and maritime boundaries, posing a legal and environmental challenge for the country and threatening Indonesia's status as an archipelagic country.

== Administrative divisions ==
The Kai Islands consist of the two distinct second-tier administrations, both in Maluku Province. The Southeast Maluku Regency (Maluku Tenggara) is sub-divided into eleven administrative districts (kecamatan); its administrative centre is the town of Langgur. Though it is geographically in the Kai Islands, the city of Tual forms a separate regency-level administration and is not part of the Southeast Maluku Regency. It includes a number of islands in the geographical Kai Islands, and it is itself sub-divided into five districts (kecamatan).

These two entities, with their administrative capitals, are listed below with their areas and their populations at the 2010 Census and the 2020 Census, together with the official estimates as at mid 2024:

Regency	Area (km^{2})	Population 2010 Census	Population 2020 Census	Population mid 2024 Estimate
Tual City (Kota Tual)	254.39	58,082	88,280	90,470
Southeast Maluku Regency (Maluku Tenggara)	1,031.81	96,442	121,511	129,235

== Culture ==
=== History ===
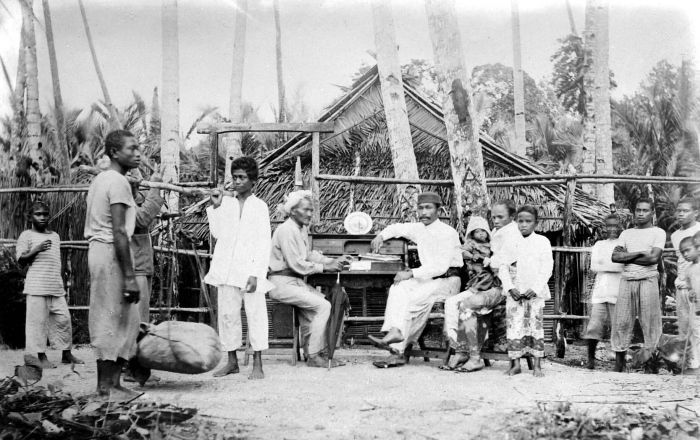

Local history holds that ancestors of contemporary Kai islanders came from Bali, part of the expanding Majapahit kingdom from the western archipelago. The village of Ohoi-Ewur (first Raja Ewab: Raja Ohoi-Ewur = Raja Tabtut) on Kai Kecil or Nuhuroa island was the arrival point for the Balinese aristocrats and their army. They stayed in the village with local residents. As a result, Ohoi-Ewur became a seat of government, where the local law (Larvul Ngabal) – Red Blood and Balinese Spear – was developed at the initiative of the royal princess Dit Sakmas.

Evidence for these stories include an inheritance and a harbor named 'Bal Sorbay' (Bali Surabaya) on Kai Kecil which is, presumably, the harbor at which the royals arrived.

It is recognized by Kai islanders that some of their ancestors came from other places such as Sumbawa island (Sumbau), Buton (Vutun) in Sulawesi, Seram (Seran) and Gorom (Ngoran) islands in the Central Moluccas, and the sultanates of Jailolo (Dalo) and Ternate (Ternat) as well.

The tiny island of Tanimbarkei is not part of Tanimbar, as the name might suggest, but is one of the Kai Islands. It is inhabited by fewer than 1000 very traditional people. Half of the population call themselves Hindus, but are more or less practicing ancestor worship.

After the 1999 clashes between the Muslim and Christian populations in Ambon, similar inter-communal clashes swept through Kai but quickly calmed down.

All of the islands depend on 22 ratshcaap, or traditional local leaders called Rat or Raja, as kings of customary law.

=== Languages ===
The official language in the Kai Islands is Indonesian, although local languages exist between regions.

Three Austronesian languages are spoken on the Kai Islands; Keiese is the most widely spoken, in 207 villages on Kai Kecil, Kai Besar, and surrounding islands. Kurese is spoken on Kur Island and nearby Kaimeer, where Kai is used as a lingua franca. Bandanese is spoken in the villages of Banda-Eli (Wadan El) and Banda-Elat (Wadan Elat) on the west and northeastern side of Kai Besar. Banda speakers originally came from the Banda Islands, but the language is no longer spoken there.

There is no native writing system for the Keiese language. Dutch Catholic missionaries wrote the language using a variation of the Roman alphabet.

=== Musical instruments ===
Some Kai musical instruments include:

- Savarngil: A small native flute from 10 to 20 centimeters (4 to 8 inches) long, open at both ends with six fingerholes placed along the pip. It is made of bamboo and keyless.
- Tiva: Single headed drums, consist of a calf skin membrane which is stretched over an enclosed space or over one of the ends of a hollow vessel.
- Dada: A medium-size gong 30 to 38 centimeters (12 to 15 inches) in size, with a crashing sound and a raised boss or nipple in the center.

=== Religion ===
The predominant religion in the Kai Islands is Christianity, where unlike like much of the surrounding area there are more Catholics (44%) than Protestants (26%). Consequently, the islands are regarded as the center of Catholicism in all of Maluku.

A primary minority in the region consists of Muslims (28%) and half of the people who live on the small island of Tanimbarkei practice a variant of the Hindu religion, which involves a form of ancestor worship.

=== Mythology ===
Their story of creation is an earth-diver myth that involves sending a dog down to the earth, who brings up his sandy paws.

There were three brothers and two sisters in the upper sky-world. While fishing one day, Parpara, the youngest of the brothers, lost a fish-hook which he had borrowed from Hian, his oldest brother. Angered by the loss of the hook, Hian demanded that it be found and returned to him. After much fruitless search, the Parpara met a fish who asked him what his trouble was, and who, on learning the facts, promised to aid in the search. At length they discovered another fish who was very ill because of something stuck in its throat. The object proved to be the long-lost hook, which the friendly fish delivered to Parpara, who thus was able to restore it to its owner.

Parpara, however, determined to have his revenge upon his brother, and so he secretly fastened a bamboo vessel full of palm liquor above Hian's bed in such a way that when the latter rose, he would be almost certain to upset it. The expected happened, and Parpara then demanded of his brother that he return to him the spilled liquor. Hian endeavoured, of course fruitlessly, to gather it up, and in his efforts dug so deeply into the ground that he made an opening clear through the sky-world.

Wondering what might lie below, the brothers determined to tie one of their dogs to a long rope and lower him through the aperture; and when they had done this, and the dog had been drawn up again, they found white sand sticking to his feet, whereupon they resolved to go down themselves, although the other inhabitants of the heaven-world refused to accompany them thither. Sliding down the rope, the three brothers and one of the sisters, together with their four dogs, safely reached the world which lay below, and which was thus discovered for the first time. As the second sister was descending, however, one of the brothers chanced to look up, at which his sister was so ashamed that she shook the rope and was hauled up by the other sky-people. In this way the three brothers with their sister were the first occupants of the world and became the ancestors of the human race.

=== Agriculture ===
The soil on Kai Kecil is of poor quality; slash-and-burn agriculture is common. Fishing is usually done around Trepang, and cultured pearls are harvested in Kai Kecil.

== Meti Kei ==
Meti Kei is an annual natural phenomenon occurring for a few weeks, and celebrated with a festival between October 22 and 23, where the ocean recedes up to 6 km, allowing for one to walk to other islands normally separated by water.

== See also ==
- List of islands of Indonesia
