= Ambonese =

Ambonese may refer to:

- anything of, from, or related to the Indonesian island of Ambon Island
  - Ambonese Malay, spoken language also referred to as Ambonese
  - Ambonese people, an ethnic group
