= Chembakolli =

- Village
- Location in Tamil Nadu, India Chembakolli (India)
- Coordinates: 11.51738°N 76.52491°E
- Country: India
- State: Tamil Nadu
- District: The Nilgiris

Government
  - Body: Gudalur Taluk

Languages
  - Official: Tamil, Chetty, Paniya, Naaikar, Kurumba, Malayalam
- Time zone: UTC+5:30 (IST)
- PIN: 643 212
- Telephone code: 914262
- Vehicle registration: TN 43 Z
- Civic agency: Gudalur Taluk
- Climate: Tropical wet (Köppen)

Chembakolli is a village in the south of India, in the Nilgiris district, Tamil Nadu. It is located in the Nilgiri Hills. Chembakolli's closest town is Gudalur and its closest city is Mysore and Coimbatore to south of Nilgiris district.

== Land Rights ==
The Adivasi Tribe were forced to leave their forest land when the Mudumalai Forest Reserve was established in 1940. On 5 December 1988 10,000 people took part in a march through the town of Gudalur, demanding the return of their land.

The Adivasi now live in 200 villages, including Chembakolli, and have the own school, Vidyodaya School, and, since 1990, their own hospital in Gudalur. They also own their own tea estate.

== Agriculture ==
Most people in Chembakolli are farmers. Crops include rice, onions, tomatoes, peppers and oranges. These crops are generally grown for consumption in the village rather than for sale. Tea is the main commercial crop grown around Chembakolli.

== Transport ==
One of the Nilgiri Ghat Roads runs from Ooty to Mysore through Gudalur. There is a bus station in Gudalur town, operated by the Tamil Nadu Transport Corporation (TNSTC-Coimbatore division). Buses run from Gudalur to Ooty, Coimbatore, Mysore and other destinations. There is also an express bus to Chennai and Coimbatore.

The nearest railway station is at Mysore with train services to Bangalore, Chennai, Mumbai, Jaipur and other destinations. There is also a station at Ooty serving the Nilgiri Mountain Railway. The nearest airport is Coimbatore International Airport. Also they use taxi's a lot.

== Education ==
Children walk to their nearest school, in Gudalur. This school has recently been rebuilt and has a library, computers and a large hall. This school is involved in teacher training. School trips are arranged, and the school has a small bus. They also sometimes get to school by using a jeep.

The village became notable in the UK when it was chosen by the UK Department of Education as a location for case study in Geography Unit 10: A village in India. ActionAid produce materials to aid in the study of the location.
