= Serui Malay =

Variety of the Papuan Malay language

- Region: Yapen Islands Regency, Waropen Regency
- Native speakers: 270,612 (2008)
- Language family: Malay Creole: East Indonesian Malay; Papuan Malay; Serui Malay

Language codes
- ISO 639-3: –
- Coordinates: 2°S 136°E

Serui Malay is a variety of the Papuan Malay language native to parts of the Indonesian province of Papua. It is spoken in the city of Serui and other places on the Yapen Islands, as well as in nearby coastal areas of the New Guinea mainland.

Though it is likely that Malay was used to an extent in previous centuries, its widespread use and its current form date to the 20th century. Serui Malay is generally referred to as Bahasa Indonesia by its speakers, but it diverges from Standard Indonesian in a number of ways. It has similarities to Ambon Malay, but Van Velzen considers it to be more closely related to Ternate Malay.

== History ==
A large number of local languages are spoken in the area, and the need for a common lingua franca has been underlined by the centuries-old traditions of inter-group interaction in the form of slave-hunting, adoption, and intermarriage. It is likely that Malay was first introduced by the Biak, who had contacts with the Sultanate of Tidore, and later, in the 19th century, by traders from China and South Sulawesi. However, Malay was probably not widespread until the adoption of the language by the Dutch missionaries who arrived in the early 20th century and were then followed in this practice by the Dutch administrators. The spread of Malay into the more distant areas was further facilitated by the Opleiding tot Dorpsonderwijzer ('Education for village teacher') programme; it tended to attract a lot of Waropen men, which has led to the influence of the Waropen language on the local Malay varieties.

== Phonology ==
People from West Yapen (Woi, Ansus, Pom) neutralise word-final nasals to [ŋ]. Those from other ethnic groups do not have [ŋ] because the phoneme is absent from their native languages. The distinction between /r/ and /l/ is clearer in the speech of educated people. The palatal stops of Indonesian are not often distinguished by uneducated speakers, who substitute /d͡ʒ/ with /di/, and /t͡ʃ/ with /ti/, /si/ or /t/ (Indonesian /ɡəred͡ʒa/ -> /geredia/; t͡ʃəŋkeh -> /sieŋge/ or /sieŋke/). Word-finally, voiceless stops and /h/ are dropped: /sudah/ -> /suda/, /takut/ -> /tako/; /k/ may or may not be dropped: /balik/ -> /bale/, /sibuk/ -> /sibuk/. /f/ is consistently distinguished, unlike in many other varieties of Papuan Malay.

Indonesian schwa /ə/ has various realisations, sometimes accompanied by a change in the position of stress: as /i/ (/pərˈɡi/ -> /ˈpiɡi/), as /a/ (/səˈnaŋ/ -> /saˈnaŋ/), as /o/ (/pəlˈuk/ -> /ˈpolo/), as /e/ (/t͡ʃəˈpat/ -> /t͡ʃeˈpat/), or dropped altogether (/təˈrus/ -> /ˈtrus/). Indonesian /ai/ and /au/ correspond to /e/ and /o/ respectively: /pakai/ -> /pake/, /pulau/ -> /pulo/.

== Grammar ==
The morphology is more limited than in standard Indonesian. For example, passive voice or object focus are not marked on the verb, and verb bases are generally used without affixes. A smaller number of derivational affixes are used than in Indonesian. The productive verbal prefixes are the following:

- ba-/bar- (corresponding to Indonesian ber-): isi 'contents' -> baisi 'contain', ana 'child' -> barana 'have children';
- ta-/tar- (corresponding to Indonesian ter-): toki 'beat' -> tatoki 'beaten'
- maN- (Indonesian meN-). Used rarely: lawan 'versus' -> malawan 'be opposed to'
- baku- (absent from Standard Indonesian, but available in Ambonese, Ternatan and Manadonese Malay). It has a reciprocal meaning: pukul 'beat' -> bakupukul 'beat each other', mayari 'seduce' -> bakumayari 'seduce each other';
- paN-, derives intransitive verbs: malas 'unwilling' -> pamalas 'not feel like'.

Reduplication is also used, with several meanings, both with nouns and with verbs: tatawa 'laugh' -> tatawa-tatawa 'laugh repeatedly', ronda 'stroll' -> ronda-ronda 'stroll around', ana 'child' -> ana-ana 'children', lap 'swab' -> lap-lap 'cleaning rag'.

Most speakers do not distinguish between inclusive and exclusive first person (kami and kita in Standard Indonesian), even though this distinction is present in most regional languages of the area.

Possession is expressed using punya (or its shortened form pu):

sa pu spatu
I POSS shoe
'my shoe(s)'

== Vocabulary ==
Serui Malay diverges in a number of ways from Indonesian in its vocabulary. There are words that have extended or otherwise changed their meaning in comparison with Indonesian:

- kumis means "moustache" in Standard Indonesian, but in Serui Malay it has developed a wider range of meanings: "moustache, beard, chest hair, sideboards"
- motor ("motor, motorcycle" in Indonesian) has similarly developed the meanings "motor, motor canoe, motorcycle, lungfish"
- Indonesian bunuh 'kill' corresponds to Serui Malay bunu, which has developed the additional meaning "switch off"
- pengayuh 'oar' is a noun in Indonesian, but in Serui Malay panggayu it is a verb meaning 'paddle, row'; the very opposite change has occurred with the Indonesian verb dayung 'row', which has become the noun dayung 'oar'.

There are many words in Serui Malay not found in Standard Indonesian:

- bia 'shell' (cf. Indonesian kerang)
- tete 'grandfather' (cf. Indonesian kakek)
- soa-soa 'iguana' (cf. Indonesian biawak)
- caparuni 'messy' (a loan from Ambonese Malay, differs from Standard Indonesian berantakan)
- rica 'chili pepper' (cf. Indonesian lombok)
- kaskado 'scabies' (cf. Indonesian kudis)
- lolaro/olaro 'mangrove trees' (cf. Indonesian pohon bakau)
- duri babi 'sea urchin' (cf. Indonesian bulu babi)
- molo 'skin diving'
- sema 'black magician'
- koming 'Papuan'
- tai yakis 'exclamation of resistance'
- mayari 'seduce'
- bilolo 'hermit crab'.

Serui Malay has borrowed vocabulary from Dutch, Portuguese, other Malay varieties and regional languages:

- testa 'head' (from Portuguese testa)
- kadera 'chair' (from Portuguese cadera)
- spir 'muscle' (from Dutch spier)
- firkan 'square' (from Dutch vierkant)
- spok 'give someone a hard time' (from Dutch spook)
- boswesen 'department of forestry' (from Dutch boswezen).

== Bibliography ==
- Kluge, Angela Johanna Helene (2014). A grammar of Papuan Malay (PhD). LOT Dissertation Series 361. Leiden University. hdl:1887/25849.
- Velzen, Paul van (1995). "Sone notes on the variety of Malay used in Serui and vicinity". In Connie Baak; Mary Bakker; Dick van der Maij (eds.). Tales from a concave world : liber amicorum Bert Voorhoeve. Department of Languages and Cultures of South-East Asia and Oceania, Leiden University. pp. 311–43. ISBN 9073006066.
