= Papuan Malay =

Vernacular Malay used in Indonesian New Guinea

- Irian Malay
- Native to: Indonesia
- Region: Western New Guinea
- Native speakers: 1.100.000 - 1.200.000 speakers combined L1 and L2 speakers (2014)
- Language family: Malay Creole: East Indonesian Malay; Papuan Malay
- Dialects: Bird's Head Malay; North Papua Malay; Serui Malay; South Coast Malay

Language codes
- ISO 639-3: pmy
- Glottolog: papu1250

Papuan Malay or Irian Malay is a Malay-based creole language spoken in the Indonesian part of New Guinea. It emerged as a contact language among tribes in Indonesian New Guinea (now Papua, Central Papua, Highland Papua, South Papua, West Papua, and Southwest Papua) for trading and daily communication. Nowadays, it has a growing number of native speakers. In more recent times, the vernacular of Indonesian Papuans has been influenced by Standard Indonesian, the national standard dialect. It is spoken in Indonesian New Guinea alongside 274 other languages and functions as a lingua franca.

Papuan Malay belongs to the Malayic sub-branch within the Western-Malayo-Polynesian (WMP) branch of the Austronesian language family.

Some linguists have suggested that Papuan Malay has its roots in North Moluccan Malay, as evidenced by the number of Ternate loanwords in its lexicon. Others have proposed that it is derived from Ambonese Malay.

Four varieties of Papuan Malay can be identified being: Serui Malay spoken in Cendrawasih Bay area, North Papua Malay spoken along the north coast of the province of Papua, South Coast Malay spoken in and around Merauke, and Bird's Head Malay spoken in the provinces of Southwest Papua and West Papua.

== History ==
Malay traders from Sultanate of Tidore and the island of Seram had travelled to Papua for trading purposes since at least the 14th century. This trade Malay established contact with coastal communities then served as an early lingua franca in the region. In 1855, German missionaries, Carl Wilhelm Ottow and Johann Gottlob Geissler arrived in northern part of West Papua, and began their religious and education mission in Mansimam, Manokwari. In 1925, a Teacher Training School together with a boarding house was established by Kijne. In classroom activities, Standard Malay was obligatory, while both Standard Malay and Papuan Malay were used during agriculture and carpentry work. After the incorporation of West Papua into Indonesia in 1969, Standard Indonesian replaced Dutch in formal domains, but Papuan Malay has persisted as the primary language of daily communication in urban areas.

== Grammar ==
=== Deictic Expressions ===
Deictic expressions are expressions that provide orientation to the hearer relative to the extralinguistic context of the utterance. The context may include features of the speech situation such as: who is speaking; the time and place of discourse; gestures of the speaker; and the location of the discourse.

Demonstratives and locatives are types of deictic expressions. In Papuan Malay there exists a two-term demonstrative system and a three-term locative system.

Both of these systems are distance-oriented. This means that the relative distance of the speaker in time and place ultimately defines the reference point to which the deictic expression refers.

For example, the speaker in (1) is in conversation about people living in a house and the speaker uses the proximal demonstrative ini to illustrate that the person they are talking to 'lives here' in the house.

ko tinggal ini
2SG stay D.PROX
'you live here'

As (1) illustrates, demonstratives and locatives function primarily to provide spatial orientation. However, there are a number of other functions that these classes of words serve. The following table outlines the different domains of use of demonstratives and locatives.

TABLE 1 - Demonstratives and locatives and their domains of use
Domains of Use	Function	DEM	LOC
Spatial	to provide spatial orientation to the hearer	X	X
Figurative locational	to signal a figurative locational endpoint		X
Temporal	to indicate the temporal setting of the situation or event talked about	X	X
Psychological	to signal the speakers' psychological involvement with the situation or event talked about	X	X
Idenitficational	to aid in the identification of definite or identifiable referents	X	
Textual anaphoric	to keep track of a discourse antecedent	X	X
Textual discourse deictic	to establish an overt link between two prepositions	X	
Placeholder	to substitute for specific lexical items in the context of word-formulation trouble	X	

==== Demonstratives ====
Demonstratives are determiners that indicate the spatial, temporal or discourse location of a referent.

In Papuan Malay's two-term demonstrative system, one is used to indicate proximity of the referent to the speaker and the other is used distally.

The demonstratives in Papuan Malay also have long and short forms, as illustrated in Table 2.

TABLE 2 - Demonstratives in Papuan Malay
Papuan Malay DEM	Long form	Short form
proximal	ini D.PROX 'this'	ni D.PROX 'this'
distal	itu D.DIST 'that'	tu D.DIST 'that'

The following examples show how Papuan Malay's two demonstratives signal either proximity or distance.

The example above, (1), and the following example (2) illustrate how ini/ni is used to indicate spatial closeness, and (3) shows how itu/tu is used to indicate distance between the referent and speaker.

bawa mace ni ke ruma-sakit
bring woman D.PROX to hospital
'(I) brought (my) wife here to the hospital'

de ada tu
3SG exist D.DIST
'She is over there'

By drawing the hearer's attention to specific objects or individuals in the discourse or surrounding context, the speaker is able to use demonstratives to provide spatial orientation whether the referent is perceived as being spatially close to the speaker, or further away.

===== Long and Short Demonstrative Forms =====
In (2) and (3), the short demonstrative form has been used.

The short forms are largely a result of fast-speech phenomena and they serve the same syntactic function as the long forms.

In terms of their domains of use, the short forms share all the same domains of use as the long forms except for identificational and placeholder uses where the short forms are not employed.

The following examples, (4) and (5), show how demonstratives may be used as placeholders. In these cases, only the long form may be used.

saya ingat ini Ise
1SG remember D.PROX Ise
'I remembered, what's-her-name, Ise'

skarang sa itu simpang sratus ribu
now 1SG D.DIST store one.hundred thousand
'Now I (already), what's-its-name, set aside one hundred thousand (rupiah)'

==== Locatives ====
Locatives are a class of words that signal distance, both spatial and non-spatial, and consequently provide orientation for the hearer in a speech situation.

Papuan Malay's three-term locative system consists of the locatives as outlined in Table 4.

TABLE 4 - Locatives in Papuan Malay
Papuan Malay LOC
proximal	sini L.PROX 'here'
medial	situ L.MED 'there'
distal	sana L.DIST 'over there'

The functions and uses of locatives include the following:

- Spatial uses
- Figurative locational uses
- Temporal uses
- Psychological uses
- Textual uses

===== Spatial Uses of Locatives =====
Spatial locatives have the role of designating the location of an object or individual in terms of its relative position to the speaker, and they focus the attention of the hearer to the specified location.

In general, proximal sini indicates a referent's closeness to the deictic centre and distal sana indicates distance from this reference point. For medial situ, the distance signalled is somewhat mid-range. That is, the referent is further away from the speaker than the referent of sini but not as far as that of sana.

In (6), sini is used to indicate the close location of an entity to the speaker, while (7) highlights the semantic distinctions between sini and sana.

sa su taru di ember sini
1SG already put at bucket L.PROX
'I already put (the fish) in the bucket here'

dong juga duduk di sana tong juga duduk di sini
3PL also sit at L.DIST 1PL also sit at L.PROX
'They also sit (outside) over there, we also sit (outside) here'

In context, the distances signalled by these terms are variable considering such distances are relative to the speaker. The use of these spatial deictics are also dependent on the speaker's perception of how near or far a referent is.

The following example, (8), demonstrates how the use of these spatial deictics are dependent on perception, using situ and sana to illustrate this. In (8), the speaker discusses the construction work that has reached the village of Warmer.

yo. mulay menuju jembatang Warmer ... kalo dari situ ke sana
yes start aim.at bridge Warmer ... if from L.MED to L.DIST
'Yes, (they) started working towards the Warmer bridge ... when (they'll work the stretch of street) from there to over there'

Syntactically, locatives in Papuan Malay only occur in prepositional phrases. These prepositional phrases can be peripheral adjuncts, prepositional predicates, or adnominal prepositional phrases.

The following examples – (9), (10), and (11) – demonstrate each of the prepositional phrases in which locatives can occur. In (10), the first clause shows how the locative can be embedded in a peripheral adjunct, whilst the second clause illustrates its occurrence in prepositional predicates.

kam datang ke sini, kam biking kaco saja
2PL come to L.PROX 2PL make be.confused just
'You come here, you're just stirring up trouble'

ko datang ke sini nanti bapa ke situ
2SG come to L.PROX very.soon father to L.MED
'You come here, then I ('father') (go) there'

orang dari sana itu ...dorang itu kerja sendiri
person from L.DIST D.DIST 3PL D.DIST work be.alone
'Those people from over there, ... they work by themselves'

===== History of Papuan Malay locative forms =====
As with the demonstratives, the locative forms in Papuan Malay are present in some other languages in the Austronesian language family tree.

For each of the locatives, the forms can be traced back to Proto-Western-Malayo-Polynesian (PWMP).

The proximal locative sini is reconstructed in PWMP as *si-ni and has retained the semantic function of indicating closeness. A number of other WMP languages also share the form and meaning of sini including: Aborlan Tagbanwa, Sangil, Kayan, and Malay.

Whilst the Papuan Malay medial and distal locatives, situ and sana, share the same form as the reconstructed forms in PWMP, there are notable differences in terms of spatial reference when comparing cognates in other WMP languages.

For medial situ, the corresponding reflexes in Ifugaw and Kenyah both indicate closeness rather than medial distance. On the other hand, for the Malay language, situ is used distally rather than proximally or medially. The WMP language that is most similar to Papuan Malay in this regard is Aborlan Tagbanwa where both the form and designated spatial distance are shared.

TABLE 5 - Reflexes of situ in WMP languages
WMP Language	Reflex	Meaning
Ifugaw	hitú	here; this
Aborlan Tagbanwa	s-itu	there
Kenyah (Long San)	s-itew	here
Malay	situ	position over there

For distal sana, Papuan Malay shares the same form and meaning with a number of other WMP languages including Kankanaey and Malay. It cannot be assumed, however, that this is the case for all WMP languages as Bontok shares the form sana but is used to indicate proximity to the hearer rather than just distance from the speaker.

TABLE 6 - Reflexes of sana in WMP languages
WMP Language	Reflex	Meaning
Kankanaey	sána	that, there, thither
Malay	sana	yonder, over there, yon
Bontok	sana	that one, close to hearer; there, close to hearer

== Morpho-syntax ==
=== Possession ===
Possession is encoded by the general structure POSSESSOR-punya-POSSESSUM, where the 'possessum' is the 'thing' being possessed by the possessor - the unit preceding punya). A typical example is shown below;

nanti Hendro pu ade prempuang kawin...
eventually, Hendro POSS ySb woman marry.unofficially
'eventually, Hendro's younger sister would marry ...'

In the canonical form, similar to (12), a lexical noun, personal pronoun or demonstrative pronoun form the POSSESSOR and POSSESSUM noun phrases.

A further example is presented below;

Fitri pu ini
Fitri POSS D.PROX
Fitri's (belongings,right.there)*

*words in brackets indicate the understood referent of a personal pronoun or demonstrative, established from the context of the utterance

As shown in (13), the long punya possessive marker can also be reduced to the short pu, an alteration which appears to be independent of the syntactic or semantic properties of the possessor and possessum.

A further reduction to =p is possible, but only if the possessor noun phrase ends in a vowel, shown below;

sa bilang, i, sa=p kaka {} {} ko=p kaka
1SG say ugh! 1SG=POSS oSb 3SG say 2SG=POSS oSb
'I said 'ugh!, (that's) my older sister', she said, 'your older sister?''

This is most common when the possessor is a singular personal pronoun (two instances of which are found in (14)), and provides an explanation for why 'Hendro punya ...'

is observed in (11), rather than the reduced theoretical possibility of 'Hendro=p'.

A final canonical possibility is the total omission of the possessive marker (indicated with a ø symbol), but this is generally restricted to inalienable possession of body parts and

kinship relations, the former seen in (4) below;

adu, bapa ø mulut jahat skali
oh.no! father {} mouth be.bad very
'oh no, father's language is very bad' (lit. 'father's mouth')

Other, less typical/more complex 'non-canonical' combinations are also possible, where the possessor and/or possessum can consist of verbs, quantifiers and prepositional phrases.

Such constructions can denote locational (16), beneficiary (17), quantity-intensifying (18), verb-intensifying (19) and emphatic (20) possessive relations.

Jayapura pu dua blas orang yang lulus ka
Jayapura POSS two tens person REL pass(a.test) or
'aren't there twelve people from Jayapura who graduated?' (lit. 'Jayapura's twelve people')

In Papuan Malay, it can be seen from (16) that being in or at a location is expressed as being 'of' (in a possessive sense) the location itself (the syntactic possessor).

The possessive marker can also direct attention to an action or object's beneficiary, where the benefiting party occupies the possessor position;

dong su bli de punya alat~alat ini
3PL already buy 3SG POSS REDUP~equipment D.PROX
'they already bought these utensils for him' (lit. 'his utensils')

In this instance, the possessive marker is an approximate substitute for the English equivalent marker 'for ___'. This demonstrates that the construction doesn't have to describe a realised possession; the mere fact that the possessor is the intended beneficiary of something (the possessum) is sufficient in marking that something as possessed by the possessor, regardless of whether the possessum has actually been received, experienced or even seen by the possessor.

Where the possessum slot is filled by a quantifier, the possessive construction elicits an intensified or exaggerated reading;

tete de minum air pu sedikit
grandfather 3SG drink water POSS few
'grandfather drinks very little water' (lit. 'few of')

However, this is restricted to few and many quantifiers, and numerals in the same possessum slot yield an ungrammatical result. As such, substituting sedikit with dua (two) in (18) would not be expected to be present in language data.

Intensification using punya or pu is also applicable to verbs;

adu, dong dua pu mendrita
oh.no! 3PL two POSS mendrita
'oh no, the two of them were suffering so much' (lit. 'the suffering of')

Here, the verbal sense of the possessum is owned by the possessor. i.e., the two of them in (19) are the syntactic 'owners' of the suffering, which semantically intensifies or exaggerates the quality of the verb suffering, hence translated as so much for its English representation.

Along similar lines to (19), a verbal possessum can also be taken by a verbal possessor, expressing an emphatic reading;

mama de masak punya enak
mother 3SG cook POSS be.pleasant
'mother really cooks very tastily' (lit. 'the being tasty of the cooking')

As indicated by the insertion of adverbials in the English translation otherwise syntactically absent in Papuan Malay (20), the verbal-possessor-punya-verbal-possessum construction elicits emphatic meaning and tone. The difference to (19) being that in (20), the verbal quality of the possessum constituent is being superimposed upon another verb element, rather than to a pronominal possessor, to encode emphasis or assertion.

A final possibility in Papuan Malay possessive constructions is elision of the possessum, in situations where it can be easily established from context;

itu de punya ø
D.DIST 3SG POSS {}
'those are his (banana plants)'

Unlike the general freedom of possessive marker form for both canonical and non-canonical constructions (11-20), the long punya form is almost exclusively used when a possessum is omitted, possibly as a means of more markedly sign-posting the possessum's elision.

Examples

- Ini tanah pemerintah punya, bukan ko punya! = It's governmental land, not yours!
- Tong tra pernah bohong = We never lie.

=== Unique Morphological Formation in Papuan Malay ===
The formation of Papuan Malay has been shaped by contact with multiple languages, such as Ambonese Malay, Noth Mollucan Malay, Indonesian and the local Papuan languages. One of the unique outcomes of this contact-induced formation is the process of clipping. Clipping is a morphological process in which a word is shortened by removing one or more syllables from the beginning, middle or and of a word without changing the meaning of the word. Papuan Malay shows this process extensively that makes it distinguish from Standard Indonesian. Clipped forms in Standard Indonesian are considered as colloquial or non-standard, while Papuan Malay uses it as the default in the everyday speech. Jayaputri & Pranowo identified five types of clipping.

Type	Papuan Malay	Standard Indonesian	English Gloss
Backclipping	ade	adik	‘younger sibling’
Middle clipping	plan	pelan	‘slow’
Two backclippings	cupen	cukup penting	‘important enough’
Middle + backclipping	sebla	sebelah	‘beside’
Foreclipping	-	-	-

The clipping in Papuan Malay attributes to the “fast rhythm” of Papuan speech and the influence of the contact languages. The clipping is not merely phonological reduction, but it has become a systematic morphological process. It contributes to the language's distinctive identity to other Malay varieties.

List of abbreviations

1PL	1st person plural
1SG	1st person singular
2PL	2nd person plural
2SG	2nd person singular
3PL	3rd person plural
3SG	3rd person singular
D.DIST	demonstrative, distal
D.PROX	demonstrative, proximal
DEM	demonstrative
L.DIST	locative, distal
L.MED	locative, medial
L.PROX	locative, proximal
LOC	locative
ySb	younger sibling
oSb	older sibling
PWMP	Proto-Western-Malayo-Polynesian
WMP	Western-Malayo-Polynesian

== Contact-Induced Structural Change ==
Due to intensive contact with surrounding Papuan (non-Austronesian) languages, Papuan Malay has adopted several Papuan features and lost some typical Austronesian features. This aligns with Thomason's (2001) framework, such change can result in both the loss of inherited features and the adoption of new ones from neighbouring languages. Papuan Malay illustrates both processes due to its location in the Austronesian-Papuan contact zone of eastern Indonesia, where it has been in intensive contact with Papuan (non-Austronesian) languages for centuries.

Loss of Austronesian Feature

There are some typical Western Austronesian features that Papuan Malay lacks or makes limited use of as a result of contact with Papuan languages. The loss of some features illustrate how areal pressure from neighboring language can lead to the erosion of inherited grammatical categories.

=== Lack of clusivity distinction in personal pronouns ===
Standard Indonesian distinguishes inclusive kita (speaker and addressee) and exclusive kami (speaker and others, excluding addressee). However, Papuan Malay has lost this distinction. The first-person plural pronouns kitong and tong are used regardless of clusivity.

Papuan Malay:

(22) kalo ko alpa, kitong tra jalang

if 2SG be.absent 1PL NEG walk

‘if you play hooky, we (INCL) won't go’

(23) dong bilang, yo tong taw ko pu sodara

3PL say yes 1PL know 2SG POSS sibling

‘they said (to her), yes, we (EXCL) know (that he is) your relative’

Standard Indonesia:

(24) kita pergi ke rumahnya

1PL go to house.3SG.POSS

‘we (INCL) go to his/her house)

(25) kami tidak diundang ke ulang tahunnya

1.PL NEG invited to birthday.3SG.POSS

‘we (EXCL) were not invited to his/her birthday’

=== Lack of a morphologically marked passive voice ===
Unlike Standard Indonesia or Malay, which mark passive voice productively with the prefix di-, Papuan Malay has no productive passive construction. Instead, it employs periphrastic construction with dapat ‘get’ or kena ‘hit’ or topicalization, to express passive-like meanings. This lack of morphologically marked passive is attributed to areal pressure from Papuan languages, which typically lack passive voice.

Papuan Malay:

(26) kasiang, de kena prut sakit langsung meninggal

pity 3SG hit stomach be.sick immediately die

‘poor thing, he was hit (by) a sick stomach (and) died immediately’

Standard Indonesian:

(27) buku itu sedang di-baca

book that PROG read.PASS

‘that book is being read’

=== Limited use of the numeral/quantifier-noun word order ===
Papuan Malay employs both numeral-noun and noun-numeral orders with distinct functions. This contrasts with Western Austronesian languages, which typically have numeral-noun order.

Papuan Malay:

(28) lima orang mati (numeral-noun)

five person die

‘five person die’

(29) pace dua ini dari pedalamang (noun-numeral)

man two this from interior

‘both these men are from the interior’

(30)smua buku bisa basa (quatifier-noun)

all book can wet

‘All books could get wet’

(31)minum te banyak (noun-quantifier)

drink tea many

‘drink lots of tea’

Standard Indonesian (numeral-noun)

(32)lima orang datang

five person come

‘five people came’

(33)semua buku dibaca

all book read-PASS

‘all books were read’

=== Adoption of Papuan Features ===
Conversely, Papuan Malay has adopted structural features from neighbouring Papuan languages.

==== Genetive-noun order ====
Standard Indonesian uses noun-genitive order. However, Papuan Malay has adopted the genitive-noun order typically of Papuan languages, using the possessive marker punya (or reduced forms pu, =p).

Papuan Malay:

(34)sa punya sabit pata

3SG POSS sickle be.broken

‘my sickle broke’

(35)sa bawa ko pu makangan

3SG bring 2SG POSS food

‘I brought food for you’ (Lit. ‘your food’)

Standard Indonesian:

(36)itu rumah saya

that house 1SG.POSS

‘that is my house’

(37)Adik Ikka

Younger.sibling Ikka.POSS

‘Ikka's younger sibling’

==== Serial verb construction ====
Papuan Malay very commonly employs SVCs, where two or more verbs are juxtaposed without any connecting morphology to form a complex predicate describing a single event. SVCs express directional, temporal, consequential, comitative and manner relations. It also encodes aspect, mood, causativity and voice.

Papuan Malay

(38)Fredrik de lari panggil bapa (directional SVC)

Fredrik 3SG run call father

‘Fredrik ran (to father and) called father’

Standard Indonesian

(39)Dia lari untuk memanggil ayah

3SG run to call father

‘he ran to call father’

==== Clause chaining ====
Papuan Malay employs clause chaining to encode distinct but related events. Chaining constructions describe sequences of consecutive or simultaneous events with each verb taking its own set of argument. Papuan Malay clause chaining does not involve switch-reference marking like Papuan languages. In contrast, Standard Indonesian typically requires conjunctions or separate sentences.

Papuan Malay:

(40)sa itu, sa pegang sagu sa makang jalang-jalang

1SG D.DIST 1SG hold sago 1SG eat RDP-walk

‘as for me, I was holding (some) sago, I ate (it) while strolling around’

Standard Indonesian

(20)aku bangun, lalu aku memberi makan kucing

1SG wake.up then 1SG give eat cat

The adoption of Papuan features such as serial verb constructions and clause chaining places Papuan Malay firmly within the East Nusantara linguistic area. Similar features are found in other Austronesian languages that have undergone prolonged contact with Papuan languages, including Ambonese Malay and North Moluccan Malay. This pattern of areal diffusion is a mark of language contact in this region.

== Phonology ==
=== Consonants ===
The table below shows the 18 consonant phonemes of Papuan Malay. The voiceless stops are usually unreleased at the end of a syllable. The phoneme /r/ has three allophones: a voiced alveolar trill, a voiceless alveolar trill, and a voiced alveolar tap.

Papuan Malay consonant phonemes
		Labial	Dental/ Alveolar	Palatal	Velar	Glottal
Plosive	voiceless	p	t		k	
Plosive	voiced	b	d		ɡ	
Affricate	voiceless			t͡ʃ		
Affricate	voiced			d͡ʒ		
Nasal		m	n	ɲ	ŋ	
Fricative	voiceless		s			h
Rhotic			r			
Lateral approximant			l			
Approximant		w		j		

=== Vowels ===
There are 5 vowel phonemes in Papuan Malay.

	Front	Central	Back
Close	i		u
Open-mid	ɛ		ɔ
Open		a	

==== Vowel allophones ====
Below are the allophones of Papuan Malay vowels.

Phoneme	Allophone
/i/	[i], [ɪ], [e]
/u/	[u], [ʊ], [o]
/ɛ/	[ɛ], [ɛ̞], [ə]
/ɔ/	[ɔ], [ɔ̞]
/a/	[a], [ɐ]

Vowels in closed syllables are centralized:

Orthographic	Phonetic	Translation
tinggi	[tɪŋ.gi]	'be high'

In the closed syllable [tɪŋ], the phoneme /i/ is realized as [ɪ]. In the open syllable [gi], the phoneme is realized as [i].

=== Stress ===
Stress has long claimed to be absent from (Papuan) Malay. Kaland conducted various detailed phonetic experiments showing the presence of word stress.

== Language Vitality ==
Papuan Malay is classified as an institutional language by Ethnologue. This means that the language has been sustained by institutions beyond the home and community. It contrasts with many indigenous Papuan and Austronesian language in the region which are classified as “shifting”, “moribund”, or “nearly extinct”. This divergence in vitality outcomes within a single geographic area illustrates how language contact can produce opposite effect, such as language death for some languages (in this case due to shift to Papuan Malay or Indonesian) and language expansion for others. Furthermore, this vitality exists alongside a diglossic relationship with Indonesian. Papuan Malay dominates informal domains such as the home or daily interaction, while Indonesian is used for formal domains such as education and government. Despite this functional division, Papuan Malay has gained visibility in broadcast media, contributing to its continued vitality and wider use across domains.

== See also ==
- Ambonese Malay
- North Moluccan Malay
- Serui Malay
- Vanimo Malay
