= North Moluccan Malay =

Malay-based creole language spoken in Indonesia

- Ternate Malay
- Bahasa Pasar
- Native to: Indonesia
- Region: North Maluku
- Native speakers: (700,000 cited 2001)
- Language family: Malay-based creole: Eastern Indonesia Malay; Manadoic Malay; North Moluccan Malay
- Dialects: Sula Malay; Ternate Malay

Language codes
- ISO 639-3: max
- Glottolog: nort2828

North Moluccan Malay (also known as Ternate Malay) is a Malay-based creole language spoken on Ternate, Tidore, Morotai, Halmahera, and Sula Islands in North Maluku for intergroup communications. The local name of the language is bahasa Pasar (literally 'market language'), and the name Ternate Malay is also used, after the main ethnic group speaking the language. It is commonly written using Indonesian orthography. One of its varieties is Sula Malay, which was formed with the influence of Ambonese Malay.

A large percentage of this language's lexicon has been borrowed from Ternatean, such as, ngana 'you (sg.)', ngoni 'you (pl.)', bifi 'ant', and fuma 'stupid', and its syntax and semantics have received heavy influence from the surrounding West Papuan languages. Other vernacular forms of Malay spoken in eastern Indonesia, such as Manado Malay and Papuan Malay, are said to be derived from an earlier form of North Moluccan Malay.

== Phonology ==
=== Vowels ===
The vowel system of North Moluccan Malay consists of five vowel phonemes and five diphthongs.

North Moluccan Malay vowels
	Front	Central	Back
Close	i		u
Mid	e		o
Open		a	

The five diphthongs are /ai/, /ae/, /ao/, /oi/ and /ei/.

=== Consonants ===
North Moluccan Malay has eighteen consonants and two semivowels.

North Moluccan Malay consonants
		Labial	Alveolar	Palatal	Velar	Glottal
Nasal		m	n	ɲ	ŋ	
Plosive	voiceless	p	t	tʃ	k	ʔ
Plosive	voiced	b	d	d͡ʒ	ɡ	ʔ
Fricative		f	s			h
Lateral			l			
Trill			r			
Semivowel		w		j		

== Grammar ==
=== Possession ===
In Ternate Malay, words do not align its forms with its grammatical roles; therefore, the functions of words are often determined by linguistic context and non-linguistic situation. In this case, possessions are often used as a tool to determine the borders of constituents for the sake of successful interpretation of word meanings and functions.

Generally, words in Ternate Malay are often constructed in head-initial structure, except from the two possessive constructions – Y pe X constructions and YX constructions, where words are constructed in head-final structure.

==== Y pe X constructions ====
In the Y pe X construction, the Y element refers to the modifier (possessor) while the X element refers to the head (possessum). The possessor and possessum are connected by pe, in which the possessum expresses de facto a nominal meaning. In English, the Y pe X constructions gives the meaning of ‘Y’s X’ and ‘the X of Y’.

According to Litamahuputty, Y pe X construction can express different meanings ranging from possession in animate subjects and inanimate subjects to non-possessive meanings. The examples below are extracted from Litamahuputty to illustrate situations when Y pe X construction is used to express possessions.

===== Non-human relationships =====
====== X is part of Y ======
In example (1), tong pe kaki is a possessive construction where the possessor tong ‘the first person plural – our’ is connected to the possessum kaki ‘leg’ using pe. Together, the construction gives the meaning of ‘our leg’, in which the leg is a part of ‘our’ body, demonstrating the relationship of ‘X is part of Y’

ka sana, de poloso tong pe kaki.
to there 3SG squeeze 1PL POSS leg
when we go there, she massages our legs

====== X is a product of Y ======
In example (2), ular pe bisa is a possessive construction where the possessor ular ‘snake’ is connected to the possessum bisa ‘venom’ using pe. Together, the construction means ‘the snake’s venom’, in which the venom is produced by the snake, demonstrating the relationship of ‘X is a product of Y’.

baru de buka ular pe bisa...
then 3SG open snake POSS poison
then he takes out the snake’s venom

====== X is a feature of Y ======
In example (3), motor pe warna is a possessive construction where the possessor motor ‘motorcycle’ is connected to the possessum warna ‘colour’ using pe. Together, the construction gives the meaning of ‘the colour of the motorcycle’, in which the colour is one of the features (such as shape, model, engine…etc.) of the motorcycle, demonstrating the relationship of ‘X is a feature of Y’.

motor pe warna deng dia sama.
motorcycle POSS colour and 3SG same
the colour of the motorcycle and him are the same.

===== Human relationships =====
====== Social relationship ======
In example (4), bank pe bini is a possessive construction where the possessor bank ‘bank employee’ is connected to the possessum bini ‘wife’ using pe. Together, the construction brings the meaning of ‘the bank employees’ wives’, which expresses the social relationship between the humane animates.

kalo dong lia ibu-ibu bank ka... bank pe bini, orang-orang di bank,
when 3PL see REDUP-mother bank or bank POSS wife REDUP-person in bank
when they see bank employees or the wives of bank employees, employees at the bank,

====== Kinship relationship ======
In example (5), Fadin pe kaka is a possessive construction where the possessor Fadin (a proper noun) is connected to the possessum kaka ‘older sibling’. Together, the construction gives the meaning of ‘Fadin’s older brother’, which expresses the kinship relationship between the two humane animates.

Fadin pe kaka ni.
Fadin POSS older.sibling this
he’s Fadin’s older brother

===== Time relationships =====
====== Future relationship ======
Example (6) is about a story of how the speaker accidentally spilled hot oil on himself.

In the possessive construction de pe beso, the possessor de ‘third person singular’ refers to the day of incident, where the possessum beso ‘tomorrow’ refers to the day after the incident. Future time relationship is shown between the day of incident and the day after the incident.

eh, de pe beso kita kage nae.
EXCL 3SG POSS tomorrow 1SG startled go.up
gee, the next morning I woke up in a shock.

====== Past relationship ======
Example (7) is about the journey of the speaker and his friends in an island where he heard a strange voice.

In the possessive construction de pe kalamareng malang, the possessor de ‘third person singular’ refers to the moment when the speaker was talking, where the possessum kalamareng malang ‘yesterday night’ refers to the night before that moment, demonstrating past time relationship between the time when the speaker heard strange voice and the time he talked.

baru de pe kalamareng malang tu kita ada dengar orang pe suara.
moreover 3SG POSS yesterday night that 1SG exist hear person POSS voice
moreover, last night I heard someone's voice

===== Human Quality =====
====== Quality ======
In Example (8), de pe bae is a possessive expression where the possessor de ‘third person singular – his’ is connected to the possesum bae ‘kindness’ with pe. The expression has the meaning of ‘his kindness’, demonstrating a quality of the humane subject.

This relationship is similar to X is a feature of Y which was demonstrated earlier, where example (8) refers to an animate and example (3) refers to an inanimate.

kita inga de pe bae skali.
1SG remember 3SG POSS good very
I always remember his kindness.

From the above examples, it can be seen that wide ranges of possessions, including possessions in human, animals, objects or even abstract items like time, can be demonstrated from the Y pe X constructions.

As mentioned earlier, word functions in Ternate Malay are often determined from contexts rather than word forms. Therefore, not all Y pe X constructions show possessive meanings. The examples below demonstrate situations where Y pe X construction is used to express meanings other than possession, for example, to express evaluative meanings or additional information:

When the possessum (X) denotes a quality with exclamative markers, it has an evaluative meaning rather than a possessive meaning.

In example (9), the Y element in the Y pe X construction ‘ngana pe capat’ is ngana, which refers to ‘second person singular’; and the X element is capa’, which refers to ‘fast’.

Since the sentence is expressed in exclamative intonations, which can be shown from the exclamation mark used at the end of the sentence and the use of ih (the exclamative expression), the construction has the evaluative meaning of ‘how fast you are!’ rather than a possessive meaning of referring the ‘quality of fastness’ to the subject.

ih, Anwar, ngana pe capat!
EXCL Anwar 2SG POSS fast
gee, Anwar, you’re fast!

When the possessum (X) denotes an action or activity, it supplies additional information to the action or activity rather than showing possessions.

In example (10), the Y element in the Y pe X construction ‘paitua pe cuci balanga’ is paitua, which refers to ‘old man’; and the X element is cuci balanga, which refers to ‘to wash a wok’.

The example provided extra information on what surprised the speaker rather than showing possession between the old man and his way of washing a wok.

paitua pe cuci balangang kita herang.
old.man POSS wash wok 1SG surprised
the way he washed the wok surprised me.

==== YX constructions ====
In the YX construction, the Y element refers to the modifier (possessor), which is often a personal pronoun or a kinship term; and the X element refers to the head (possessum), which is often a thing word. The construction also has a meaning of ‘Y’s X’ and ‘the X of Y’ in English. The examples below are extracted from Litamahuputty, which demonstrated the use of element Y as a personal pronoun and kinship term in YX constructions:

===== Possessor Y as a personal pronoun =====
Example (11) has demonstrated the use of YX construction with element Y as a personal pronoun, where the possessor dong refers to ‘third person plural’ and the possessum parau refers to ‘boat’. Together, it has the meaning of ‘their boat’ .

ikang bawa dong parau.
fish bring 3PL boat
a fish is pulling their boat

===== Possessor Y as a kinship term =====
Example (12) has demonstrated the use of YX construction with element Y as a kinship term, where the possessor tete refers to grandfather and the possessum papa refers to father. Together, the expression has the meaning of ‘the grandfather’s father’, demonstrating the kinship relationship.

tete papa orang Ternate.
grandfather father person Ternate
my grandfather’s father is a person from Ternate.

=== Personal pronouns ===
Personal pronouns in North Moluccan Malay only distinguish between person (first, second and third person) and number (singular and plural). Some pronouns can also be used to show respect to other speakers.

Person	Singular		Plural	
	Full	Shortened	Full	Shortened
1	kita, saya (respectful)	ta	(ki)torang	tong
2	ngana	nga	ngoni	ngo
3	dia	de	dorang	dong

==== Politeness ====
The use of the first person singular pronouns kita and saya is dependent on the speech situation. Kita is used when talking to others of the same or lower age, rank or status. On the other hand, saya is used in more formal situations or when conversing with someone with a higher rank or status, to show respect to the other person.

The second person singular and plural pronouns, ngana and ngoni also share a similar distinction. Ngana is used to refer to an addressee if they of the same or lower age, rank or status. Otherwise speakers may use personal names or kinship terms to refer to the addressee. Alternatively, the plural second person pronoun ngoni can occasionally be used to refer to a single addressee respectfully, although it is typically reserved for addressing a group of people.

These distinctions are demonstrated in example (1) where the speaker telling his friends of a situation where he explains to a woman that he does not want to accept money for helping to carry her shopping onto the bus. Since he is talking to his friends he refers to himself as kita, but because he is not familiar with the woman he uses the more respectful saya to refer to himself and ngoni to address her.

kita bilang, "Ibu... saya bantu saja pa ngoni."
1SG say mother 1SG assist only to 2
"I said: 'Madam, I'm only helping you.'"

==== Full and shortened forms ====
For pronouns with a full and shortened form, the two forms may be used interchangeably in most contexts. However, following the conjunction deng or prepositions (such as di, ka, dari or pa) only the full form may be used. This is seen in example (2) where the short form de is used except following the preposition pa, where the full forms dia and torang appear instead:

tikus ini, kalo manakal pa dia, de manakal pa torang.
mouse this when be.naughty to 3SG 3SG be.naughty to 1PL
"this mouse, if we harm it, it will harm us"

In addition, the shortened forms do not appear post-verbally (i.e. after predicates). Hence in the following example tong cannot appear after the verb bunu "kill", only the full form torang is allowed:

iblis tara mungkin bunu torang
devil NEG possible kill 1PL
"it's impossible for a devil to kill us"

The full form of the first person plural pronoun torang is actually a shortening of kitorang which is sometimes used by older speakers however younger speakers rarely use this form.

The only exceptions to the two restrictions mentioned above is when the pronoun is part of a Y pe X possessive construction in which case the shortened form may be used as the possessor Y. Example (4) shows a possessive Y pe X construction containing the first person plural short form pronoun dong occurring after a preposition pa:

tong brenti pas pa dong pe muka.
1PL stop exact to 3PL POSS face
"we stopped precisely in front of them."

Similarly, example (5) shows the third person singular short form pronoun de occurring after the verb iko "follow" also as part of a Y pe X possessive construction. This contrasts with the use of the full form dia after the second instance of iko, where the pronoun is no longer part of a possessive construction:

de pe lalar iko de pe luka, bukang iko dia.
3SG POSS fly follow 3SG POSS wound NEG follow 3SG
"the flies are following his wounds, they are not following him."

=== Negation ===
North Moluccan Malay uses predicate operators to express negation (negators). Predicate operators are used to express certain meaning aspects, they also act as a grammatical function by showing that the construction in which they take part in is best to be interpreted as predicate. tara 'not (present)' and bukang 'not' are two negators that are frequently used to negate predicates in this language.

tara implies absolute absence 'not present'; however, while used in negating thing constructions contexts, tara could mean 'not possess'. On the other hand, bukang implies a contradiction 'not A, (but B)'. In negating thing constructions, bukang negates the identity of the thing and implies an alternative.

==== Negator tara ====
Examples of the usage of negator tara 'not (present)' can be seen in the following sentences.

Example (1) shows negator tara preceding predicate tidor 'sleep', this results tara tidor 'not sleep'.

kita bilang, "ngana tara tidor?"
1SG say 2SG NEG sleep
I asked, "aren't you going to sleep?"

In example (2), the predicate sadiki 'a little' refers to a small amount. Preceded by negator tara, tara sadiki 'not a little' refers to the subject of the example de pe sajara 'the history', which has a Y pe X possession construction. tara sadiki 'not a little' in this case describes the amount of the subject as the entity.

de pe sajara tara sadiki.
3SG POSS history NEG a.little
the stories he has are not just a few.

Example (3) shows tara negating predicate dua 'two' which refers to an amount. In this case, tara dua 'there are no two (of them)' works as an expression which means that something has no equal. The subject kita pe mara ni 'my anger' expresses the entity that it has no (second) equivalent.

ih, kita pe mara ni tara dua.
EXCL 1SG POSS angry this NEG two
gee, I was so angry. (lit. 'my anger does not have an equivalent')

Example (4) displays tara with the meaning 'not possess'. The predicate consists of negator tara 'not' preceding cewe 'girl' resulting tara cewe 'no girl(friend)'. This predicate describes the state of subject kita 'first person singular' which make the meaning 'not possess' of tara relevant. This results tara cewe to have the meaning 'do not have a girl(friend)'.

cek, kita tara cewe.
EXCL 1SG NEG girl
gee, I don't have a girlfriend.

Similar to example (4), example (5) shows the sense of 'not possess' of tara. The story of example (5) is that the speaker thought that he was offered tea when it was actually instant coffee. The explanation is that he was not familiar with instant coffee since he usually drank coffee that had coffee dregs in it. In this example, the predicate is constructed of negator tara and ampas 'dregs', this results tara ampas '(there are) no dregs' which in this situation ampas is coffee dregs.

me, tara ampas.
PTCL NEG dregs
It didn't have any dregs.

Negator tara also has variations, one of them is when it precedes ada 'be present' then it can merge into tarada 'not present'. Generally, tara ada 'not be present' and tarada can be used interchangeably; however, some speaker might have clear distinction between the two.

Example (6) shows that the predicate consists of negator tara and ada resulting tara ada 'not present'. The predicate precede the subject aer 'water', therefore it has a predicate-subject construction of tara ada aer 'there is no water'.

[...] kolam mandi-mandi cuma tara ada aer.
{} pool REDUP-bathe only NEG exist water
[...] a bathing pool, but there was no water.

Example (7) has tarada as its predicate. The example consisted of two clauses, the first one samua tikus kacili 'all mice are small' which describes the size of the mice. The second clause consists of predicate tarada and yang basar 'big ones' (with the information from the previous clause, this refers to the mice). This also constructs a predicate-subject construction as found in example (6), which results tarada yang basar 'there are no big ones'.

samua tikus kacili tarada yang basar.
all mouse small NEG REL big
all mice are small, there are no big ones.

tarada could also act as the negative response to questions, this function could be applied to example (8). In this example, the speaker gives two alternatives of the possible results of a soccer player kicking a ball. The first alternative is that there would be a gol 'goal', while the second one there wouldn't tarada 'not (present)'. tarada 'no' could be used give this question a negative answer.

gol ka tarada?
goal or NEG
would there be a goal or not?

tar is another variation of tara, which is a shorten form of it. tar can immediately precede a predicate and no other lexical material can intervene. It seems that tar is in a progress of becoming a bound element tar- to express negation.

Example (9) shows the use of tar as the shortened form of tara in the predicate which is then followed by tau 'know'. This results tar tau ' not know'.

Allah, tong tar tau.
Allah 1PL NEG know
oh my God, we didn't know that.

==== Negator bukang ====
Negator bukang means 'not A, (but B)', it implies that the opposite or the alternative of the expressed is prominent. It is not obligatory to overtly express the opposite or alternative.

Example (10) has a story of a man to be mistaken as a porter, therefore he explained that he was not. The example has negator bukang preceding ana-ana baangka 'porter', this results bukang ana-ana baangka 'not a porter'. In this example, ana-ana baangka is the negated scope.

saya tara... bukang ana-ana ba-angka."
1SG NEG NEG PL-child DUR-lift.up
I'm no..., I'm not a porter."

Different from example (10) that doesn't imply explicitly the alternative or opposite, example (11) states clearly the alternative of the negated thing. Example (11) has a story of someone asking the speaker if there is actually a snake in his garden. The speaker then answer the question using bukang which negates di atas, di atas refers to a location on the hill. The alternative or the opposite is stated as di bawa barangka 'at the lower part, at the ditch'.

ada, tapi bukang di atas, di bawah barangka.
be.present but NEG in top in bottom ditch
yes, there are, not up the hill, but down at the ditch.

Example (12) displays a case where bukang negates a clause. The story of example (12) is about a boat that seem to be moving by itself, which then the real cause is explained. bukang precedes dong panggayung 'they paddle' in order to perform negation. The alternative, which in this case is the real reason of the situation, is stated as ikang kase lari dong parao 'a fish takes away their boat'. The negation scope in this example is on the people who paddle the boat, because it was actually the fish that moved the boat instead of the people.

padahal bukang dong panggayung...
whereas NEG 3PL paddle
while they're not paddling...

ikang kase lari dong parao, ikang basar.
fish give run 3PL boat fish big
a fish is taking away their boat, a big fish.

== See also ==
- Ambonese Malay
- Papuan Malay
- Serui Malay
- Sula Malay
