= Chitty Museum =

Museum in Melaka Tengah, Malacca, Malaysia

- Muzium Chetti
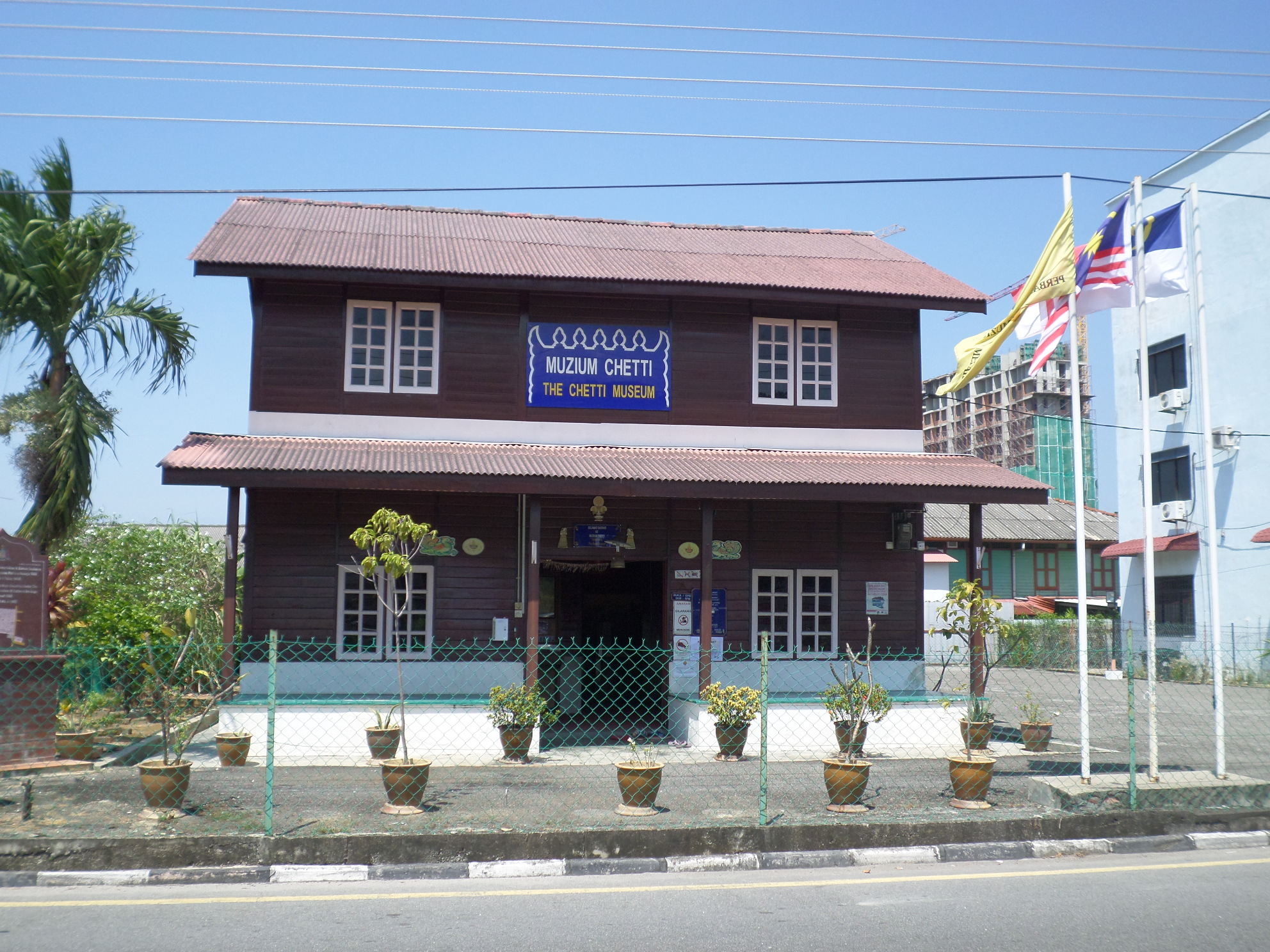
- Established: 5 August 2003
- Location: Malacca City, Malacca, Malaysia
- Coordinates: 2°12′13.4″N 102°14′29.4″E
- Type: museum
- Curator: Valliammai A. Sinnaperumal
- Owner: Malacca Museum Corporation

The Chitty Museum (Malay: Muzium Chetti), also known as the Chitty's Museum, is a museum about the minority Chitty community, which is located within the Chitty Village area in Malacca City, Malacca, Malaysia. It is housed in a traditional Chitty house which has been constructed and renovated by the Malacca Museum Corporation (PERZIM).

The Chitty had previously desired to run a museum but were stymied by the 1997 Asian financial crisis. Visits in June 2000 by Tan Sri Datuk Seri Haji Mohd Ali Rustam, Chief Minister of Malacca at the time, secured the necessary funding to establish the museum. The construction of the museum was funded by Malacca State Government, completed in September 2002 and museum was opened on 5 August 2003.

The museum exhibits all of the information regarding Chitty community. It houses a collection of artifacts and archives of the daily life of Chitty people, ranging from history, temple, attire, trustee, food, culture, religious affairs etc.

== See also ==
- List of museums in Malaysia
- List of tourist attractions in Malacca
