= Sri Poyatha Moorthi Temple =

Hindu temple in Melaka, Malaysia

Sri Poyatha Moorthi Temple (Vinayagar Temple)
- Malay: Kuil Sri Poyatha Moorthi; Tamil: ஸ்ரீ போயாத மூர்த்தி கோவில்
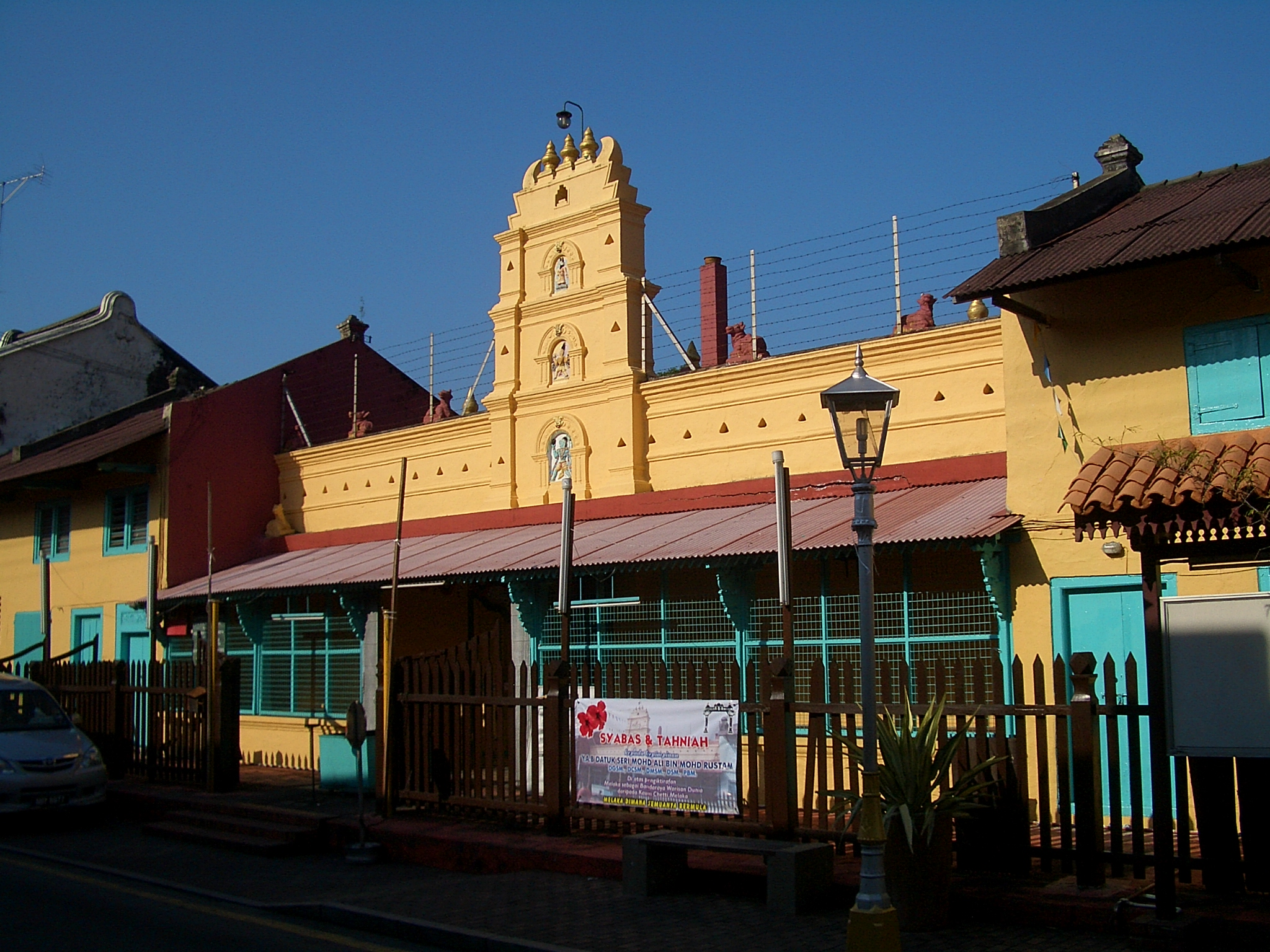

- Location in Malaysia

Religion
- Affiliation: Hinduism
- Deity: Ganesha

Location
- Location: Jalan Tukang Emas
- State: Malacca
- Country: Malaysia
- Coordinates: 2.205575°N 102.242448°E

Architecture
- Type: Chitty style simplified Dravidian architecture
- Creator: Thaivanayagam Chitty
- Completed: 1781

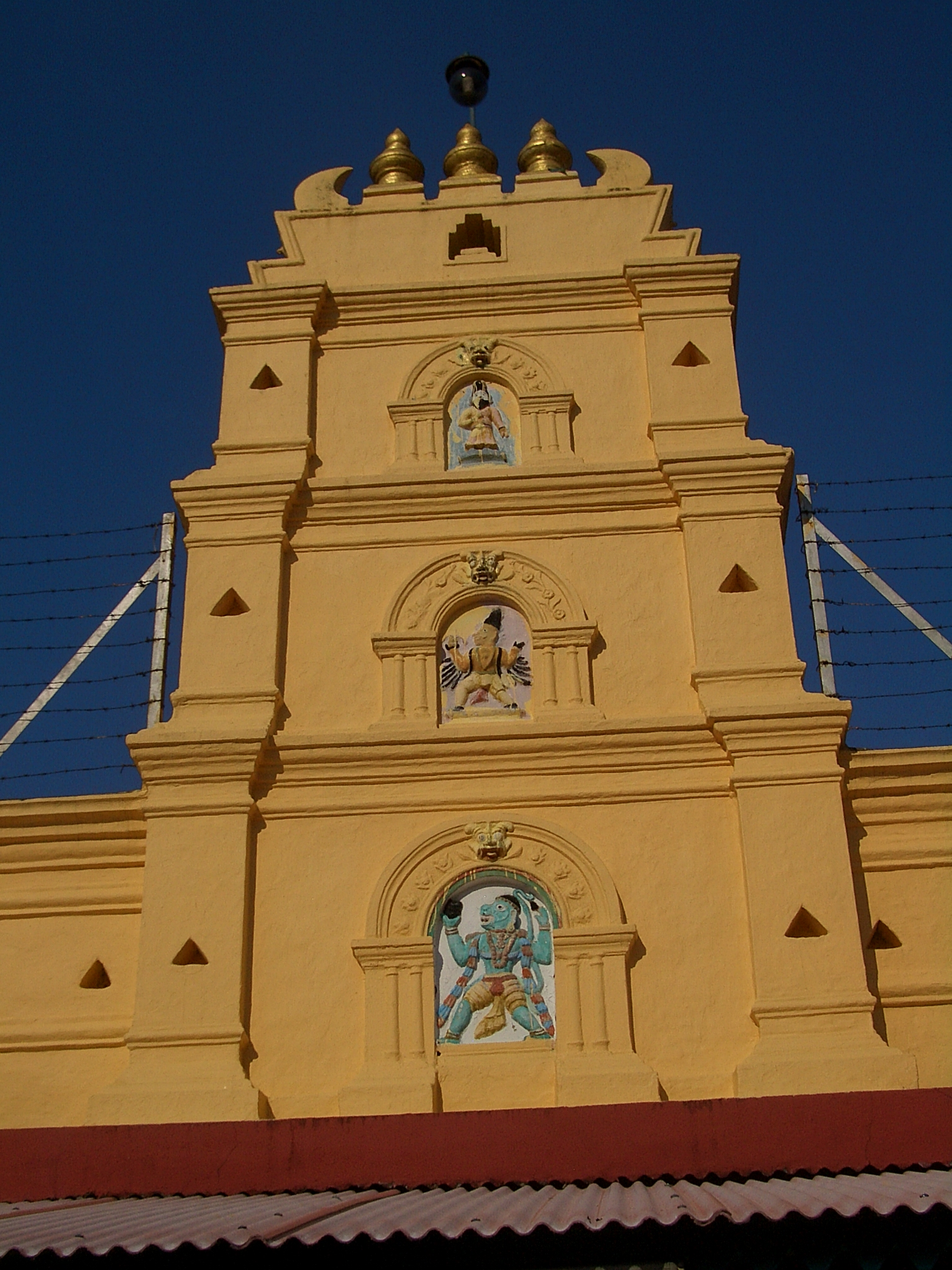
The gopuram of the temple

Sri Poyatha Moorthi Temple is the oldest existing/intact Hindu temple in Malaysia and one of the oldest functioning Hindu temples in Maritime Southeast Asia. Located in the state of Malacca, the temple is one of the few existing Chitty temples in Malaysia.

The temple is situated on Jalan Tukang Emas, also known as "Harmony Street" because of its proximity to the Kampung Kling Mosque and Cheng Hoon Teng Temple.

The temple was built by Thaivanayagam Chitty, the leader of the Chitty people, in 1781 after the Dutch colonial government of Malacca gave him a plot of land. The temple is dedicated to Vinayagar or Ganesha, the elephant deity. In the back room is a sculpture of the deity with the head of an elephant and the body of a man with four hands. There is another altar dedicated to Lord Muruga, the younger brother of Lord Vinayagar.

== History ==
The Dutch colonial government in Malacca granted the Chitty community a piece of land, on which they built the temple in 1781. The land was located at Goldsmith Street, now known as Jalan Tukang Emas, bearing Lot No. 62 Town Area XIU and measuring 15,879 square feet (1,475.2 m^{2}) for the purpose of setting up a Hindu temple. The temple was built up in the year 1781 according to the date mentioned in the Dutch grant (freehold title). The temple was under the trusteeship of the late Mr. Thaivanayagam Chitty, who was then a leader of the Chitty community.

== Architecture ==
The simplification of culture and customs can be seen at the Sri Poyatha Moorthi Temple. Distinct from the South Indian temples, which have a complex Dravidian Architecture in the Pallava style, which displays carved out sculptures of the Hindu gods in many rows, the Chitty temple tend to only have one row, or a picture of one single god in each of the three rows, as evidenced in the Sri Poyatha Moorthi Temple.

== Administration ==
The 'Sri Poyatha Vinayagar Moorthi Temple', although the property of the “Malacca Chetti or Chetti of Malacca”, has been managed by the 'Malacca Nagarathar Nattukkottai Chettiar' for more than 20 years through an agreement (since 1962) made between them because the British colonial government prior to Malaysian independence that refused to allow the chettiar group to put up another Hindu temple of their own in the Malacca Town area. The temple was built in the year 1781 according to the date mentioned in the Dutch grant (freehold title).

== Festivals ==
The Malacca Chittys observe rituals, festivals and ceremonies, such as Thai Pongal, Maattu Pongal for those who rear cows, Kaanum/Kanni Pongal especially for maidens, Deepavali, putting 'Kolams' and flowers during the month of Margali on the doorsteps, Kelemays Sarasvathi (Ahyutha poojas), Sivarathri, Egadesi, Amman Thiruviza, carrying of the Kavadis during the months of Thaipusam, Masimagam, Sithrai, Panguni Utharam, Adi matham prayers and the taking out of the Rathams (Religious Chariots) in procession for some festivals.

There are three Rathams made of wood with lovely carvings of Indian Deities, and dating back some 200 years. The Rathams are maintained in good condition and kept in the temple grounds. One Ratham is for Lord Ganesha, one for Lord Subramaniar Swamy, and one for Lord Rama Swamy. They are used during festive seasons drawn by bullocks and are lighted with decorative lamps making them look beautiful at night.

The 'Sri Muthu Mariamman Thiruvizha' festival during the Sitrai matham (April/May) is major celebration among the Chitty diaspora who are currently spread over Malaysia and Singapore.

== See also ==
- Hinduism in Malaysia
