= Malay trade and creole languages =

Languages descended from Low Malay

- Bahasa-bahasa Melayu dagang dan kreol بهاس٢ ملايو داݢڠ دان کريول
- Native to: Southeast Asia, South Asia and Australia
- Ethnicity: various
- Language family: Creole: Malay trade and creole languages

Language codes
- ISO 639-3: –
- IETF: crp-035

In addition to its classical and modern literary form, Malay had various regional dialects established after the rise of the Srivijaya empire in Sumatra, Indonesia. Also, Malay spread through interethnic contact and trade across the south East Asia Archipelago as far as the Philippines. That contact resulted in a lingua franca ("trade language") that was called Bazaar Malay or low Malay and in Malay Melayu Pasar. It is generally believed that Bazaar Malay was a pidgin, influenced by contact among Malay, Chinese, Indian, Arab, Persian, Portuguese, Dutch, and English traders.

Besides the general simplification that occurs with pidgins, the Malay lingua franca had several distinctive characteristics. One was that possessives were formed with punya 'its owner, to have'; another was that plural pronouns were formed with orang 'person'. The only Malayic affixes that remained productive were tər- and bər-.

Other common features:

- Ada became a progressive particle.
- Reduced forms of ini 'this' and itu 'that' (>ni, tu) before a noun.
- The verb pərgi 'go' was reduced, and became a preposition 'towards'.
- Causative constructions were formed with kasi or bəri 'to give' or bikin or buat 'to make'.
- A single preposition, often sama, was used for multiple functions, including direct and indirect object.

For example,

- Rumahku 'my house' becomes Aku punya rumah (lit. 'I have (that) house')
- Aku pukul dia 'I hit him' becomes Aku kasi pukul dia (lit. 'I give a hit to him')
- Ardi dipukul oleh Dani 'Ardi is hit by Dani' becomes Ardi kena pukul dek Dani

== Peranakan-Baba Malay ==
Baba Malay ملايو بابا
- Region: Malacca (in Malaysia) and Singapore
- Native speakers: 2,000 (2014)
- Language family: Malay-based creole

Language codes
- ISO 639-3: mbf
- Glottolog: baba1267
- ELP: Baba Malay

=== Baba Malay ===
Baba Malay is spoken by the Peranakans in Malacca (in Malaysia) and Singapore. A typical contact language between Hokkien male settlers and local Malay women, it has "more Hokkien grammar and more Malay lexicon". As of 2014, there are 1,000 speakers in Malaysia and another 1,000 in Singapore. It is mostly spoken among the older populations. In 1986, Pakir estimated there were 5,000 speakers in Singapore. A Baba Indonesian variant is also spoken in East Java.

Example (spoken in Melaka-Singapore):

- Dia suka datang sini sembang.: He likes to come here and gossip.
- Keliap-keliap, dia naik angin.: Slightly provoked, he gets angry.
- Gua tunggu dia sampai gua k'ee geram.: I waited for him until I got angry.
- Oo-wa! Kinajeet, dia pasang kuat.: Wow! Today he dresses stylishly!

=== Peranakan Indonesian ===
Peranakan Indonesian
- Bahasa Indonesia Peranakan; Basa Peranakan بهاس ڤرانقن
- Region: East Java, Central Java. West Java, North Sumatra, West Kalimantan, and other pocket communities in Indonesia
- Ethnicity: Peranakan; Javanese-Chinese; other Indonesian ethnicities
- Native speakers: (20,000+ cited 1981)
- Language family: Malay-based creole

Language codes
- ISO 639-3: pea
- Glottolog: pera1256

A kind of Baba Malay, locally called Peranakan from the ethnonym, the language is spoken among Chinese-Indonesians living in various regions of Indonesia, most visibly in Surabaya and Medan. It is a mixture of three languages: Indonesian (national language), a local language and Chinese elements (ancestry/ethnic language, particularly for certain jargon or glossary such as family relations, business and commerce, and culinary fields). The most famous variety is found in East Java, especially in Surabaya and surrounding areas, called Boso Suroboyoan (Surabayan language), with a strong emphasis of low Javanese (ngoko Javanese) and informal tone, which is not only spoken by Chinese-Indonesian in Surabaya, but also by non-Chinese-Indonesians when conversing with the former.

Example (spoken in Surabaya):

- Kamu mbok ojok gitu!: Don't act that way!
- Yak apa kabarnya si Eli?: How's Eli?
- Ntik kamu pigio ambek cecemu ae ya.: Go with your sister, okay?
- Nih, makanen sakadae.: Please have a meal!
- Kamu cariken bukune koko ndhek rumahe Ling Ling.: Search your brother's book in Ling Ling's house.

Apart from East Javanese Peranakan dialect, other Chinese-Indonesians tend to speak the dialects/varieties of the places in which they live, such as the Central Javanese Peranakan dialect, which like the East Javanese variant, mixed Indonesian and Chinese with Javanese (both ngoko and krama Javanese).

West Javanese Peranakan dialect tend to mix Sundanese in their vocabulary, while Jakartan Peranakan dialect mixed Betawi, and Medan (North Sumatra) and West Kalimantan Peranakan dialects have more Hokkien words mixed in.

There is no formal recognition of this language, no literature, no standardization, and the language is not included in the national census/surveys, so the language have a low visibility and awareness among its speaker and general populace. But increasingly more contents in the language are created in new generation social media and short videos.

== Betawi Malay ==
Betawi, also known as Batavian, Jakartanese, Betawi Malay, Batavian Malay, or Jakarta Malay, is the spoken language of the Betawi people in and around Jakarta, Indonesia. The name "Betawi" stems from Batavia, the official name of Jakarta during the era of the Dutch East Indies. A precise number of speakers is difficult to determine due to the vague use of the name.

Linguistically, the traditional dialects as spoken for in-group communication within the Betawi community differ quite significantly from Colloquial Jakarta Indonesian, the vernacular Indonesian variety used as a lingua franca among the diverse urbanites in Greater Jakarta and elsewhere in Indonesia. In modern-day Jakarta and the surrounding area, Betawi and Indonesian are often used in a continuum, with traditional varieties as the basilect and Standard Indonesian as the acrolect. Colloquial Jakarta Indonesian, which sits in the middle, incorporate significant influence not only from Betawi, but also from other languages brought by migrants to Jakarta. According to Uri Tadmor, there is no clear border distinguishing Colloquial Jakarta Indonesian from Betawi language.

== Benteng Malay ==
Benteng language (basa Bénténg; also known as Benteng Malay or Malay dialect of Benteng Chinese) is a variety of Malay-based creole (related to Betawi language) spoken by the Benteng Chinese community in the Greater Tangerang area and its surroundings. The community of speakers of this language is a Peranakan Chinese community who have lived for generations along the Cisadane River, as well as the upstream hinterland of Tangerang and parts of western Bogor Regency. This language is the result of a process of language contact and deep cultural acculturation between elements of Malay, Hokkien, and Sundanese. The Tangerang City Government through the Department of Culture and Tourism has even studied the Benteng language to be proposed as one of Indonesia's Intangible Cultural Heritage (Warisan Budaya Takbenda; WBTb) to the Ministry of Culture of the Republic of Indonesia.

== Thousand Islands Malay ==
The Orang Pulo language (Logat Orang Pulo), alternatively known as Melayu Campuran (Mixed Malay) or Melayu Kepulauan Seribu (Thousand Islands Malay), is a Malay-based creole spoken by the Orang Pulo (lit. 'People of Island') inhabiting the Thousand Islands off the coast of Jakarta, Indonesia. This language emerged from a mixture of many languages in Indonesia, particularly Buginese and Malay.

== Malaccan Creole Malay ==
The Malay Chetty creole language (also known as Malaccan Creole Malay, Malaccan Malay Creole and Chitties/Chetties Malay) is a Malay-based creole spoken by the Chetties (also known as Indian Peranakans), a distinctive group of Tamil people found mainly in Malacca in Malaysia and Singapore, who have adopted Chinese and Malay cultural practices whilst also retaining their Hindu heritage.

== Sri Lanka Malay ==
Sri Lankan Malay ([mə.la.ju ʃri lə.ŋka]), also known as Sri Lankan Creole Malay, Bahasa Melayu, Ja basawa, or Java moli, is a Malay-based creole language spoken in Sri Lanka, formed as a mixture of Sinhala and Shonam (Sri Lankan Muslim Tamil), with Malay being the major lexifier. It is traditionally spoken by the Sri Lankan Malays, Javanese Sri Lankans, and among some Sinhalese in the Southern Province. Today, the number of speakers of the language have dwindled slightly but it has continued to be spoken notably in the Hambantota District of Southern Sri Lanka, which has traditionally been home to many Sri Lankan Malays.

== Singapore Bazaar Malay ==
Singapore Bazaar Malay, also known as Bazaar Malay, Pasar Malay, or Market Malay, is a Malay-lexified pidgin, which is spoken in Singapore. Tamil and Hokkien contributed to the development of Bazaar Malay, with Hokkien being the dominant substrate language of Bazaar Malay, with Malay being the lexifier language. However, there are many input languages spoken by immigrants that also contributed to the development of Bazaar Malay, including languages spoken by Malays, Chinese, Indians, Eurasians, and Europeans. Singapore Bazaar Malay emerged along with the opening of Singapore's free trade port in 1819, to overcome barriers in communication and business transactions. Since Singapore has only four official languages (English, Mandarin, Malay, and Tamil), Singapore Bazaar Malay not only is a lingua franca in interethnic communication, it is also used in intra-group communication. Singapore Bazaar Malay is mostly spoken by elders and middle-aged workers today, but its language status is declining due to education policies and language campaigns with less than 10,000 speakers.

Bazaar Malay is used in a limited extent in Singapore and Malaysia, mostly among the older generation or people with no working knowledge of English. The most important reason that contributed to the decline of Bazaar Malay is that pidgin Malay has creolised and created several new languages. Another reason is due to language shift in both formal and informal contexts, Bazaar Malay in Singapore is gradually being replaced by English, with English and Singlish being the lingua franca among the younger generations.

== Sabah Malay ==
Sabah Malay
- Bahasa Melayu Sabah بهاس ملايو سابه; Bahasa Sabah بهاس سابه
- Native to: Malaysia
- Region: Sabah, Sulu Archipelago, Labuan, North Kalimantan, southern part of Palawan
- Native speakers: "growing" 3 million L2 speakers (2013)
- Language family: Malay–based creole
- Writing system: Latin (Rumi); Jawi

Language codes
- ISO 639-3: msi
- Glottolog: saba1263

A creolised variant of standard Malay, Sabah Malay is a local trade or Malay-based creole language. There are a large number of native speakers in urban areas, mainly children who have it as first or second native language. It is a lingua franca of the Malaysian state of Sabah. There are also some speakers in the southernmost parts of the Philippines, particularly in the Sulu Archipelago and southern part of Palawan as a trade language. It is also spoken in the North Kalimantan in Indonesia. There are loanwords from Dusun, Tausug, Sama-Bajau, Tidong, Paitan, Chinese, Brunei Malay, Indonesian, standard Malaysian and as well as other ethnic native languages of Sabah & North Kalimantan.

== Makassar Malay ==
Makassar Malay
- Bahasa Melayu Makassar
- Native to: Indonesia
- Region: Makassar, South Sulawesi
- Native speakers: None; Second language: 1.9 million (2000)
- Language family: Mixed Malay–Makassarese

Language codes
- ISO 639-3: mfp
- Glottolog: maka1305

Makassar Malay is a creole-based mixed language, which is built of the Bazaar Malay lexicon, Makassarese inflections, and mixed Malay/Makassarese syntax.

It is now widely spoken as the first language in Makassar City and its surrounding areas, especially by those born after the 1980s.

Throughout the southern part of Sulawesi island it is used as regional lingua franca or as second language due to contact or trade with people from Makassar City.

== Balinese Malay ==
Balinese Malay
- Loloan Malay
- Omong Kampong بهاس ملايو بالي ᬒᬁᬢᬶᬬᬂ
- Native to: Indonesia
- Region: Bali (especially in Jembrana)
- Ethnicity: Loloan Malays
- Native speakers: (25,000 cited 2000 census)
- Language family: Malay-based creole
- Writing system: Latin script Jawi script Balinese script

Language codes
- ISO 639-3: mhp
- Glottolog: bali1279

Balinese Malay or Loloan Malay is a dialect of Malay spoken in the island of Bali. It is also known as Omong Kampong (lit. 'village speak') by its speakers. Balinese Malay is the primary language of ethnic Malay who live in the northwestern part of the island, mainly in the districts of Kecamatan Melaya and Kecamatan Negara, Jembrana Regency. The current language status is threatened.

According to I Wayan Bawa (1983), Balinese Malay is spoken as the first language in western Bali by 14,422 people in Jembrana Regency. The speakers are found in Negara district, including the villages of West Loloan, East Loloan, Tegal Badeng Islam, Pembangunan, Cupel, and Banyubiru, as well as in Melaya district, specifically in Melaya Bawah village.

== Broome Pearling Lugger Pidgin ==
Broome Pearling Lugger Pidgin is a pidgin that sprang up in Broome, Western Australia in the early 20th century to facilitate communication between the various groups working in the pearling industry there—Japanese, Malays, Torres Strait Islanders, Koepangers, Hakka Chinese, Filipinos, Sri Lankans of Sinhalese and Tamil descent, a small number of Koreans, and local Indigenous Australians, mainly of the Bardi people but also Nyulnyul, Jabirr Jabirr, Jukun, Yawuru and Karajarri people. The name derives from the boats used for pearling, known as pearling luggers.

Chirikurok	-kaa	hokurok	-kaa	peke	kriki.
English: "three o'clock"	Japanese: "or"	English: "four o'clock"	Japanese: "or"	Malay: "go"	English: "creek"
"We will enter the creek at three or four o'clock."

== Eastern Indonesia Malay ==
The creoles of eastern Indonesia appear to have formed as Malays, using lingua franca Malay, established their monopoly on the spice trade before the European colonial era. They have a number of features in common:

- ə becomes a, e, or assimilates to the following vowel
- i, u lowered to e, o in some environments, especially when it is at the end of a syllable
- there is a loss of final plosives p, t, k, and n the neutralisation of final nasals in part of the lexicon
- the perfective marker juga reduces to ju or jo
- the perfective marker lebih reduces to le
- the perfective marker mau reduces to mo
- the perfective marker mana reduces to ma (as this only occur on Kupang Malay).
- the perfective marker dan reduces to deng
- the perfective marker pun reduces to pung
- the perfective marker sudah reduces to su or so

For example:

- makan becomes makang
- pərgi becomes pigi or pi
- tərkəjut becomes takajo
- ləmbut becomes lombo
- dapat becomes dapa
- jangan becomes jang
- pada becomes pa
- lupa becomes lu

There is a loss of diphthongs:

- the diphthong "au" become to "o"
- the diphthong "ai" reduces to "e"
- the letter" u" become "o"

There are many affixes that the pronunciation is simplified:

- The prefix "mə(N)" reduces to "ma"
- The prefix "bə(r)", reduces to "ba"
- The prefix "tə(r)", reduces to "ta"
- The prefix "kə", reduces to "ka"

For example:

The loss of middle "ə" and "h" in the last end of words:

- tərbəlah becomes tabala
- bərtəngkar becomes batengkar
- mənangis becomes manangis
- kəhidupan becomes kaidopan

=== Alor Malay ===
Alor Malay is spoken in the Alor archipelago. Speakers perceive Alor Malay to be a different register of standard Indonesian, but both of these are prestige varieties of the archipelago. Many people are able to understand standard Indonesian, but cannot speak it fluently and choose to use Alor Malay on a daily basis.

Alor Malay is based on Kupang Malay; however, Alor Malay differs significantly from Kupang Malay, especially in its pronouns.

=== Ambonese Malay ===
Ambonese Malay or simply Ambonese is a Malay-based creole language spoken on Ambon Island in the Maluku Islands of Eastern Indonesia. It was first brought by traders from Western Indonesia, then developed when the Dutch Empire colonised the Maluku Islands and was used as a tool by missionaries in Eastern Indonesia. Malay has been taught in schools and churches in Ambon, and because of this it has become a lingua franca in Ambon and its surroundings.

=== Banda Malay ===
Banda Malay
- Banda Islands Malay
- Native to: Indonesia
- Region: Banda Islands
- Native speakers: (3,700 cited 2000)
- Language family: Malay-based creole: East Indonesian; Banda Malay

Language codes
- ISO 639-3: bpq
- Glottolog: band1353

Banda Malay is a distinct variant of Moluccan Malay, spoken in Banda Islands, Maluku. Significantly different from Ambonese Malay and for Ambonese, Banda Malay tends to be perceived as sounding funny due to its unique features.

Example :

- beta : I
- pane : you
- katorang : we
- mir : ants (deviated from Dutch : mier)

=== Dili Malay ===
Dili Malay is a variety of trade Malay spoken in Dili, Timor Leste especially in the Kampung Alor area. According to experts, before becoming the mother tongue of a number of its speakers, this language was originally a pidgin language (Bloomfield, 1933; Hall, 1966). Then, in its development, this pidgin language became a creole language which was used in wider social interactions in society (Todd, 1974:50). Due to the long historical presence of the Portuguese in East Timor, several Dili Malay loanwords originate from Portuguese and Tetum, with little influences from other native languages.

=== Gorap ===
Gorap is a Malay-based creole language predominantly spoken by Gorap (Bobaneigo) ethnic group, indigenous to western and northern regions of the Indonesian island of Halmahera. It shares vocabulary with other Papuan languages and some of languages spoken in Sulawesi, such as Buginese and Cia-Cia. Roughly around 60 out of 200 attested words in this language were indicated sharing vocabulary with those languages.

=== Kupang Malay ===
Kupang Malay or Kupang language is a Malay-based creole language spoken in Kupang, East Nusa Tenggara, which is on the west end of Timor Island. Kupang Malay is presently used as a lingua franca for inter-ethnic communication, and it also has native speakers.

=== Larantuka Malay ===
Larantuka Malay (bahasa Nagi, Melayu Larantuka), also known as Nagi, is a Malay-based creole language spoken in the eastern part of Flores in Indonesia, especially in Larantuka. It is a derivative of Malay which is thought to originate from Malacca. It is a language with unspecified linguistic affiliation. According to 2007 data, this language is spoken by 20,000 speakers, mainly the people of East Flores. Larantuka Malay is the mother tongue of the Nagi people. Then it also functions as a second language for several nearby communities.

=== Manado Malay ===
Manado Malay, Manadonese, or simply the Manado language, is a creole language spoken in Manado, the capital of North Sulawesi province in Indonesia, and the surrounding area. The local name of the language is bahasa Manado, and the name Minahasa Malay is also used, after the main ethnic group speaking the language. Since Manado Malay is used primarily for spoken communication, there is no standard orthography.

=== Maumere Malay ===
Maumere Malay
- Alok Market Malay
- Bahasa Melayu Maumere; Bahasa Melayu Pasar Alok
- Native to: Indonesia
- Region: Maumere, East Nusa Tenggara
- Ethnicity: Lio, Sikka, Javanese, and Bajo Wuring
- Native speakers: L1: unknown L2: 90,000
- Language family: Malay-based creole: Eastern Indonesia Malay; Maumere Malay
- Writing system: Latin

Language codes
- ISO 639-3: –

Maumere Malay is a Malay-based creole on or even a pidgin spoken in Maumere, a small town on the north coast of Flores Island, East Nusa Tenggara. There is no clear classification of this language, but if we look at the linguistic characteristics and speech conditions, this language is included in the pidgin language, because the vocabulary and grammar are limited, and often taken from several different languages. This language is most commonly used in situations such as trade or when people speak different languages and do not understand each other.

=== Sula Malay ===
Sula Malay
- Sula–Taliabu Malay
- Melayu Sula
- Native to: Indonesia
- Region: Sula Islands and Taliabu Island
- Native speakers: 170,000 (2023 estimate)
- Language family: Malay-based creole: Eastern Indonesia Malay; North Moluccan Malay; Sula Malay
- Writing system: Latin

Official status
- Recognised minority language in: Indonesia

Language codes
- ISO 639-3: –
- Glottolog: None

Sula Malay is a variety of Malay-based creole language which is generally used by multiethnic society in Sula Islands and Taliabu Island in the southwest part of North Maluku. The Sula Malay is heavily influenced by other languages, This can be found in loan words originating from Ambonese Malay and Dutch language can be found in Sula Malay. Some contraction vocabulary can also be found in this language, as is the case in North Moluccan Malay (Ternate Malay).

=== Ternate/North Moluccan Malay ===
North Moluccan Malay (also known as Ternate Malay) is a Malay-based creole language spoken on Ternate, Tidore, Morotai, Halmahera, and Sula Islands in North Maluku for intergroup communications. The local name of the language is bahasa Pasar (literally 'market language'), and the name Ternate Malay is also used, after the main ethnic group speaking the language. It is commonly written using Indonesian orthography. One of its varieties is Sula Malay, which was formed with the influence of Ambonese Malay.

=== Papuan Malay ===
Papuan Malay or Irian Malay is a Malay-based creole language spoken in the Indonesian part of New Guinea. It emerged as a contact language among tribes in Indonesian New Guinea (now Papua, Central Papua, Highland Papua, South Papua, West Papua, and Southwest Papua) for trading and daily communication. Nowadays, it has a growing number of native speakers. In more recent times, the vernacular of Indonesian Papuans has been influenced by Standard Indonesian, the national standard dialect. It is spoken in Indonesian New Guinea alongside 274 other languages and functions as a lingua franca.

== Bibliography ==
- Ethnologue: Malay-based creoles
