= Chitty =

Tamil ethnic group

Chitty Peranakan Chitty
Total population
- ~16,150

Regions with significant populations
- Vietnam: c. 0 (after the 1975 incident)
- Singapore: 5,000
- Malaysia: 6,150

Languages
- Malay (Chitty Malay) · English

Religion
- Hinduism

Related ethnic groups
- Tamils · Telugus · Malays · Mamaks · Peranakan · Indian Malaysians · Indian Singaporeans · Chinese

The Chitty, also known as the Chetty or Chetti Melaka, are an ethnic group whose members are of primarily Tamil descent, found mainly and initially in Melaka, Malaysia, where they settled around the 16th century, and in Singapore where they migrated to in the 18th and 19th centuries from Melaka. Also known colloquially as "Indian Peranakans", the culture of the Chitty has drawn significant influence from the Nusantara region and to a small extent the Chinese, whilst also retaining their Hindu faith and heritage. In the 21st century, their population stands at 2,000. The Chitty/Chetti community are different from Chettiar, bankers brought from Tamil Nadu to British Malaya. They are practising Hindus.

== Language ==
Like the Peranakans, the Chitty speak a Malay patois proper to their community, which is mixed with many Tamil loan words. Despite having Tamil ancestry, the Chettis don't speak Tamil.

== History ==
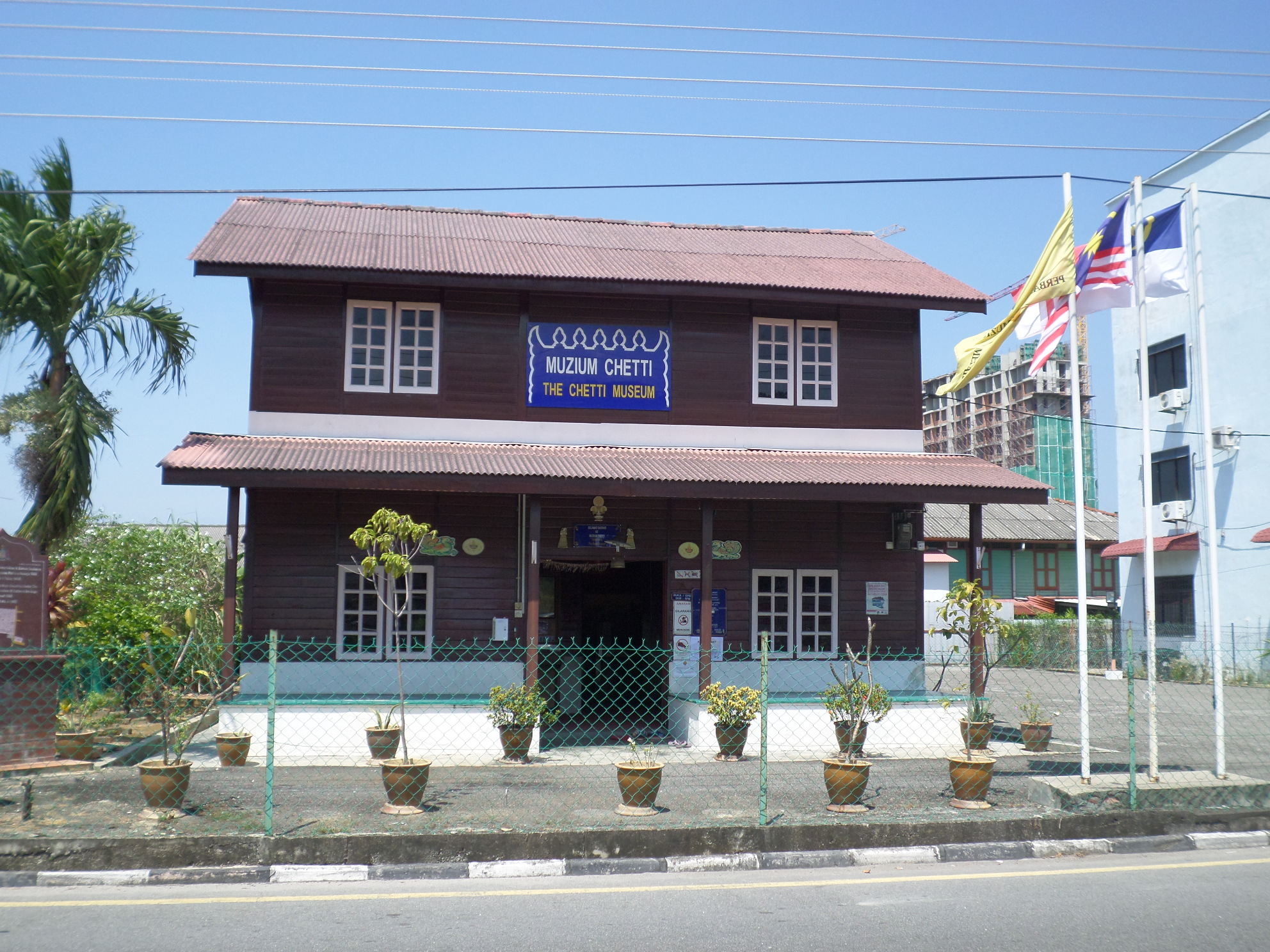
Chitty Museum in Melaka.

Historical records stated that the Tamil traders from Panai in Tamil Nadu settled down in Melaka during the sovereignty of the Sultanate of Malacca. Like the Peranakans, they later settled down and freely intermingled with the local Malays and Chinese of Malay and Tamil ancestry settlers. However, with the fall of the Malacca Sultanate after 1511, the Chitty eventually lost touch with their native land.

Under the administration of the Portuguese, Dutch and British colonizers, the Chitty eventually began simplifying their culture and customs by adopting local customs. This can be evidenced in the architecture of the Sri Poyatha Moorthi Temple, which was built by Thaivanayagam Pillay, the leader of the Chitty people, in 1781 after the Dutch colonial government gave him a plot of land. At that period, a Chitty neighbourhood was probably set up around that temple, in the street known as Goldsmith Street.

During the Second World War, the threat of Japanese soldiers rape against Chitty girls led Chitty families to let Eurasians, Chinese and full blooded Indians to marry Chitty girls and stop practicing endogamy.

The traditional Chitty settlement is located at Kampung Tujuh along Jalan Gajah Berang, which is also inhabited by a small number of Chinese of Tamilian ancestry and Malays as well. Many of the Chitty have since found jobs in Singapore and other parts of Malaysia.

The ethnic identity of the Chitty is nearly lost. As many of them are assimilating into the mainstream Indian, Chinese and Malay ethnic communities culturally, this small but distinct group of people that has survived for centuries is now on the brink of extinction.

Exhibition of Peranakan Chitty history, antiques and culture can be seen at the Chitty Museum in Chitty Village, Melaka, Malaysia. Recently in 2013, there were controversies of development at the expense of demolishing part of Kampung Chitty, a historical and cultural village. A proposal to construct a condominium, a hotel and a road cutting through the village are seen as a threat affecting the residents and a temple built in 1827.

== Religion ==
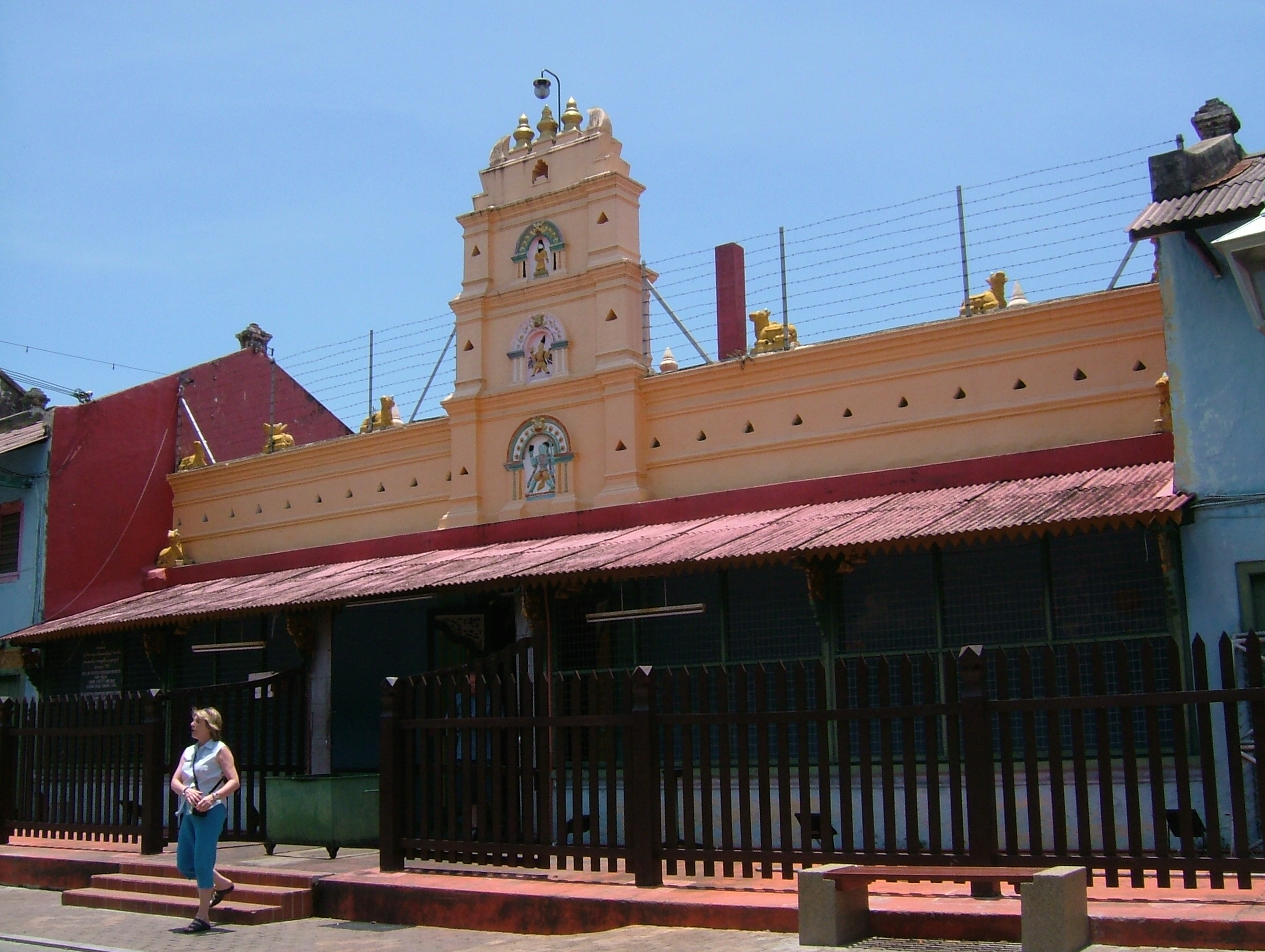
Sri Poyatha Moorthi Temple in Melaka.

The Chitty are a tightly knit community of Saivite Hindus, worshipping in their three temples. Gods such as Ganesha and Shiva are worshipped in full gaiety. Hints of Taoist and Islamic influences are also evident in their religious rituals. As staunch believers of the Hindu faith, the Melakan Chitty community still upholds their religious ceremonies. They observe Deepavali, Ponggal, the Hindu New Year, Navratri and other traditional Hindu festivals that are celebrated by Hindu groups in Malaysia. However, the Chitty do not participate in Thaipusam at a grand level like most Hindu groups. During the month of May they have a similar festival to Thaipusam in their local temple called Mengamay. One celebration that is unique to the Chitty community is the Parchu festival. It is celebrated twice a year with Parchu Ponggal (Bhogi) observed the day before Ponggal in January and Parchu Buah-buahan during the fruit season between June and July.

== Culture ==
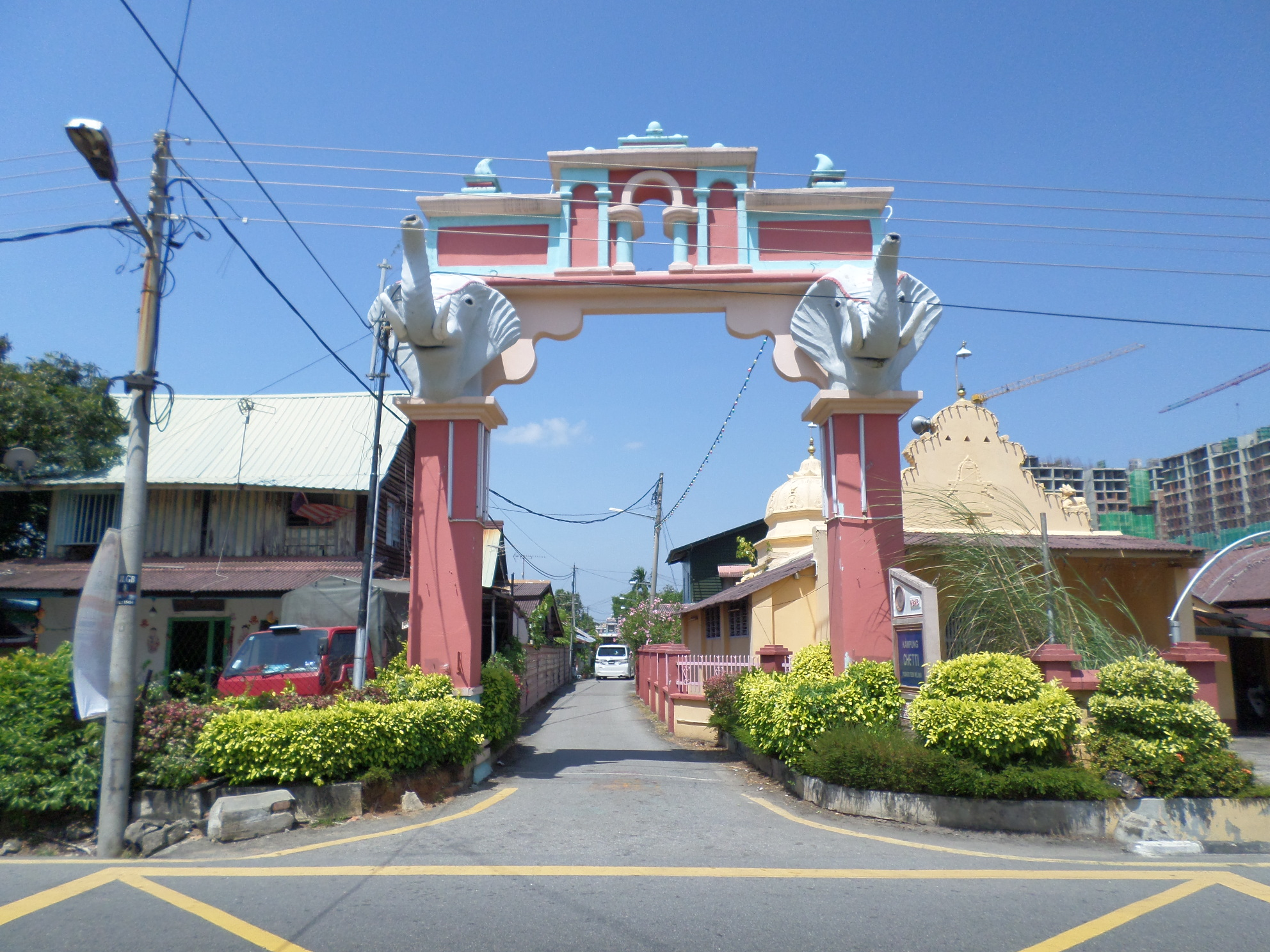
Chitty Village in Melaka.

Culturally, the Chitty have largely assimilated into the Malay culture with some Chinese, Dutch and Portuguese influences, although certain elements of Indian culture do remain. This is especially true in the case of marriages, where offerings of fruits and burning of incense are used. In the case of food, Malay spices, ingredients and the way of cooking have largely supplanted the Indian style.

Chinese cultural influence on the Chetty is also evident, especially in the case of ancestral worship. Religious objects used for conducting rituals were also used by the Chinese. The Chitty are also influenced by the Chinese to some extent in their ceramics works of art.

Simplification of Tamil architecture among the Chitty is also present. Distinct from the modern Tamil Nadu, known for its complex Tamizh Temple Architecture in the early pandya, medieval chozha/ chera& late Nayaka dynasties/Vijayanagara], that displays beautifully carved out sculptures of the Hindu gods in many rows, the Chitty temple tend to only have one row of these, or a picture of one single god in each of the three rows, as evidenced in the Sri Poyatha Moorthi Temple, built by Thaivanayagam Chitty in 1781. The Chitty temples also demonstrate the adoption of some Dutch colonial architectural influences.

== Cuisine ==
Chitty Melaka has a unique Indian-Peranakan fusion style cuisine blending of Tamil spices with Malays ingredients like belacan and lemongrass.

A well known method of cooking that used by this community is Pindang. Pindang is a cooking method in Malay language of boiling ingredients in brine or acidic solutions.

== Notable Cuisines ==
Some of the food are served during Chitty festival like the Parchu Bhogi.

== Dress and lifestyle ==
Most of the Chitty have adopted the Malay costume. In the case of men, a comfortable sarong and Malay shirt may be worn, although a songkok may also be worn. Women, on the other hand, wear a similar costume that are similar to the Peranakan Nonya.

Alongside their Chinese of Tamilian ancestry and Malay neighbours, the Chitty live in Kampong houses. Pictures of Hindu gods and Indian names can be seen just outside their houses, as their descendants tend to adopt Indian, rather than Malay surnames.

A typical Chitty home is distinctly marked by mango leaves arranged in a row, dangling from above the front door. Chitty temples are also adorned this way.

This is the old tradition still followed in Tamil Nadu from ancient period during functions.

== Notable Chitty ==
- Raja Mudaliar
- Thevanaigam Veerasimir Chitty 'David/Baba'
- Chaitanya Anand

== See also ==
- Mamak people
- Peranakan
