= Malay Chetty creole language =

Language of Malaysia and Singapore

Malay Chetty creole
- Malaccan Creole Malay; Malaccan Malay Creole; Chitties/Chetties Creole
- Native to: Malaysia
- Region: Malacca
- Ethnicity: Chitty people
- Native speakers: 300
- Language family: Malay-based creole: Malay Chetty creole

Language codes
- ISO 639-3: ccm
- Glottolog: mala1482

The Malay Chetty creole language (also known as Malaccan Creole Malay, Malaccan Malay Creole and Chitties/Chetties Malay) is a Malay-based creole spoken by the Chetties (also known as Indian Peranakans), a distinctive group of Tamil people found mainly in Malacca in Malaysia and Singapore, who have adopted Chinese and Malay cultural practices whilst also retaining their Hindu heritage.

Spoken since the 16th century by descendants of Tamil merchants of the Malacca Straits, Malay Chetty creole may be historically related to Sri Lanka Creole Malay. The current language status is moribund, due to inter-marriage and out-migration. There has been a language shift towards Malay instead.

Malay Chetty creole is a mix of Malay, Tamil and English, although the latter's presence in the creole is not as prominent compared to the first two languages. Because of the strong influence of Malay, Malay Chetty creole is not very different from other Malay dialects, especially the Middle Malacca Malay dialect. Nonetheless, it does have its own unique features.

Malay Chetty creole shares many features with Baba Malay, suggesting that they may have come from the same source language that is Bazaar Malay.

== Phonology ==
=== Comparison with Standard Malay ===
==== Deletion of the Phonemes r and h ====
- Final /r/ is omitted
  - benar /bənar/ ≙ [bəna] 'true'
- /h/ is omitted in initial, final and mid positions except in a few words
  - hijau /hid͡ʒau/ ≙ [id͡ʒo] 'green'
  - tahu /tahu/ ≙ [tau] 'to know'
  - darah /darah/ ≙ [dara] 'blood'

==== Monophthongisation ====
- Final /ai/ is reduced to half-closed front [e]
  - pakai /pakai/ ≙ [pake] 'to wear'
- Final /au/ is reduced to half-closed back [o]
  - pulau /pulau/ ≙ [pulo] 'island'

==== Phoneme Deletion in Consonant Clusters in Trisyllabic Words ====
- Mid consonant cluster /mb/ is reduced to [m]
  - sembilan /səmbilan/ ≙ [səmilan] 'nine'

==== Phoneme Insertion ====
- Glottal [ʔ] is inserted at word final position in words that end with /a, i, u/
  - bawa /bawa/ ≙ [bawaʔ] 'to bring'
  - cari /t͡ʃari/ ≙ [t͡ʃariʔ] 'to search'
  - garu /garu/ ≙ [garoʔ] 'to scratch'

== Vocabulary ==
Vocabulary Comparison
Standard Malay	Malay Chetty creole	English Translation
halwa	alua	'sweets'
anak angkat	anak piara	'adopted child'
mak cik/adik emak	bibik	'auntie'/'female sibling of mother'
berkata	bilang	'say'
cahaya	caya	'light'
tanah/tanah pamah	darat	'land'/'lowland'
dakwat	dawat	'ink'
dosa	deraka	'sin'
gagap	gagok	'stutter'
kau/kamu/anda	lu	'you'
kamu semua	lu orang	'you' (plural)
pak cik	mama	'uncle'
mak cik	mami	'auntie'
cawan	mangkok	'cup'
bidan	dukon	'midwife'
nafas	napas	'breathe'
hari ini	nyari	'today'
pergi	pi	'go'
