= Ambonese Malay =

Language in Maluku

- Native to: Indonesia
- Region: Maluku Islands
- Native speakers: (250,000 cited 1987); 1.4 million L2 speakers
- Language family: Malay Creole: East Indonesian; Ambonese Malay
- Dialects: Ambon Malay; Dobo Malay; Melayu Sini (Dutch Ambonese Malay)

Language codes
- ISO 639-3: abs
- Glottolog: ambo1250

An Ambonese Malay speaker, recorded in the United States.

Ambonese Malay or simply Ambonese is a Malay-based creole language spoken on Ambon Island in the Maluku Islands of Eastern Indonesia. It was first brought by traders from Western Indonesia, then developed when the Dutch Empire colonised the Maluku Islands and was used as a tool by missionaries in Eastern Indonesia. Malay has been taught in schools and churches in Ambon, and because of this it has become a lingua franca in Ambon and its surroundings.

Christian speakers use Ambonese Malay as their mother tongue, while Muslims speak it as a second language as they have their own language. Muslims on Ambon Island particularly live in several areas in the city of Ambon, dominant in the Salahutu and Leihitu Peninsulas. While in the Lease Islands, the Christian Ambonese-speaking community is dominant in parts of Haruku, Saparua and Nusa Laut islands. Ambonese Malay has also become lingua franca in Buru, Seram, Geser-Gorom and the south-western Maluku Islands, though with different accents.

While originally derived from Malay, Ambonese Malay has been heavily influenced by European languages (Dutch and Portuguese) as well as the vocabularies or grammatical structures of indigenous languages. Muslims and Christian speakers tend to make different choices in vocabulary. Papuan Malay, a Malay creole spoken in the Indonesian part of New Guinea, is closely related to Ambonese Malay and is said to be a derivative of Ambonese Malay or Manado Malay or a mixture of both. According to Robert B. Allen and Rika Hayami-Allen, the eastern Indonesian forms of Malay have their roots in North Moluccan Malay.

== Morpho-syntax ==
=== Pronouns and person markers ===
In Ambonese Malay, personal pronouns typically have a full form, as well as another one or more shortened and/or variant forms. The pronouns vary in terms of number - singular and plural, as well as clusivity, such as exclusive forms which exclude the addressee and inclusive forms which include the addressee. Such distinction is relatively typical of Austronesian languages. The following table provides a summary of all the pronouns found in Ambonese Malay:

Personal pronouns
		Singular		Plural	
		Full (and variant) form	Short form	Full (and variant) form	Short form
1st person	Exclusive	Beta	bet; be	Bat'ong (dialectal form recorded at Booi, Saparua Island)	
1st person	Inclusive	Beta	bet; be	Kat'ong	tong
2nd person		Ose; Ale	os; se al	Dorang	dong
3rd person		Dia	di; de	Dorang	dong
3rd person	neuter	Ontua; Ongtua; Antua; Angtua Akang	ont'o; ant'u; ant'o kang; ang	Dorang	dong

==== Etymology ====
A number of observations can be made from the pronouns of Ambonese Malay which demonstrate etymology of certain pronouns:

1. A number of pronouns are historically compounded. They are:
  - Bat'ong: Derives from beta 'I (1SG) + orang 'people; man'
  - Kat'ong: Derives from *kita 'we (1PL) + orang 'people; man'
  - Dorang: Derives from dia 'he; she; it (3SG) + orang 'people; man'
2. The 2nd person singular form ose is derived from the Portuguese pronoun voce, meaning 'you; thou'.
3. The 2nd person singular form ale is derived from a vernacular language.

==== Politeness ====
Similarly to other Austronesian languages, such as Malay and Indonesian, the 2nd person singular and one of the 3rd person singular pronouns in Ambonese Malay vary in their degree of politeness. They are summarised in the following table:

Person	Politeness marking	Full singular form	Short singular form
2nd	Markedly impolite Used in familiar and intimate relationships and when no outspoken respect needs to be expressed Expresses intimacy. Used among peers, or to people of lower status.	ose Ale	os se al
3rd	Markedly polite. Used by people of younger age to refer to adults and by adults to refer to people of equal or higher social rank.	Ontua; ongtua; antua; angtua	

It is also important to note that although in Ambonese the 1st person singular form beta is the standard form, in Classical Malay, it is used only by royal persons speaking to equals of rank.

===== Syntactic positions =====
As previously mentioned, Ambonese pronouns consist of a full and one or more variant form. Full forms occur in every syntactic position. Variant form have a more restricted distribution and may be functionally different. The following table summarises the set of full personal pronouns plus (in brackets) their variant forms according to context and syntactic function:

Personal pronouns and their syntactic function
Person	One-word sentence	Subject	Object (of verb or prep.)
1S	beta	beta (bet; be)	beta
2S	ose (os; se) ale	ose (os; se) ale (al)	ose (os; se) ale
3S 3SN	dia antua (etc.) ontua (etc.)	dia (di; de) antua (etc.) ontua (etc.) akang	dia antua (etc.) ontua (etc.) akang (kang; ang)
1P	kat'ong	kat'ong (tong)	kat'ong
2P	dorang (dong)	dorang (dong)	dorang (dong)
3P	dorang (dong)	dorang (dong)	dorang (dong)

From this table it follows that two factors determine whether a personal pronoun can be shortened: syntactic construction and syntactic position:

- Except for the first person singular beta, first person plural kat'ong and third person singular dia, all pronouns can be shortened in one-word sentences. Third person singular neuter akang cannot form a one-word sentence altogether.
- In clauses all personal pronouns in Subject position may be shortened, except for third person singular neutral akang.
- In clauses all personal pronouns in Object position may be shortened, except for first person singular beta, first person plural kat'ong, second person ale and third person singular dia.
- Likewise, as preposition object all personal pronouns except for beta, ale, kat'ong and dia may be shortened.

These facts show that se, os 'you', dong 'you', ont'o, ant'o, ant'u 'he; she' and dong 'they' have developed into doublets which are functionally (but not semantically) on a par with their full forms, while other short forms (bet, al, kang, ang) are phonological variants with a more restricted distribution.

It is also important to note a number of syntactic variations within the functions of personal pronouns in Ambonese:

1) The 3rd person single dia 's/he; it' can be shortened to di or de when it is in Subject position, or when it is head of a Noun Phrase (NP) in object position.

2) The 3rd person single antua (and angtua, ontua, ongtua) is also a modifier of head nominals in a phrase, thereby adding an aspect of deference. It adds a feature respect.

Ant'o Onggo
3S O.
Mr. Onggo

Antua parangpuan sana tu
3S woman yonder that
the woman overthere

3) The third form, akang, is a neater pronoun 'it', which also functions as a determiner. This form links up with the demonstratives ini and itu for deictic reference: it occurs as a single attribute before nouns, and in combination with postnominal tu.

Akang barang tu
3S.N things that
those goods

Akang gunting di mana?
3S.N scissors at where
Where are the scissors?

4) The short form of dorang, which is dong, also functions as a modifier in NPs to create collective plurals.

mama dong
mother 3P
mother and the others (i.e. the children, her family, friends, etc.)

Okto dong
O. 3P
Okto and people who are like him

Anis dong
A. 3P
Anis and his friends

==== Reduplication ====
Reduplication with personal pronouns is not frequent. The following examples denote a concept "referent of pronoun plus persons who are alike":

De seng datang lia kat'ong-kat'ong
3S not come see REDUP~1P
He doesn't come to visit people like us

Macang ose-ose bagini seng bisa dapa akang
kind REDUP~2S {like this} not can get 3S.N
People like you now can't get it

=== Word Order ===
Ambonese Malay is a SVO (subject-verb-object) language. Its basic word order has the subject in initial position, followed by the verb and then the object, as shown below. 'Subject, verb, object' are labelled 'S, V, O' respectively:

Pombo kasi tongka satu {for Kes}.
dove give stick {one to} monkey
S V O {} {}
"Dove gave a stick to Monkey."

=== Negation ===
Negation in Ambonese is sentential rather than constituent. Negation is predominantly expressed by five free morphemes that are treated as adverbs, modifying predicates, clauses or parts of the sentence as opposed to specific elements (such as single verbs or nominals). These morphemes are listed below alongside their common variants and English equivalents:

- seng ‘no, not’
- tar (tra) ‘no, not’
- bal’ong (blong) ‘not yet’
- bukang ‘no, not’
- jangang (jang) ‘don’t’.

Constituent order

Ambonese negators are typically positioned between the subject and the VO-group. This word order is typical of SVO languages. In the following example, the subject pronoun de precedes the negator seng (represented here as sem), and the verb group headed by the verb bisa follows it.

Der tadi de so sem bisa k atas lei.
From {just now} 3S PHA no can to top also
"Just now she already couldn't go up (the tree) anymore."

==== Summary of distinguishing features ====
1. All negators except tar/tra can be used as one-word sentences in response to a Yes-No question.
2. All negators except jangang/jang can be used in declarative and interrogative sentence types.
3. Only jangang/jang can be used in an imperative sentence.

These features will be explored in greater detail below.

==== Seng ====
Seng is the most commonly used negator.

Although Ambonese generally operates on the premise of sentential negation, seng can be used in a marked word order to narrow the scope of negation to single verbs or nominals. Seng moves rightwards in the clause, shifting the focus of negation to the word it immediately precedes. In the first example below, seng occurs in its default position between the subject de and the verb group headed by kar'ja, modifying the verb group kar'ja bat'ul in a general sense. In the second example, seng is integrated into the verb group itself, immediately preceding and placing the emphasis of negation on the verbal modifier bat'ul.

De seng karj'a bat'ul.
3S no work right
"He doesn't work well."

De karj'a seng bat'ul.
3S work no right
"He works not well."

Seng also collocates with modal auxiliary usa to express a lack of necessity:

Papa, seng usa mara, deng seng usa malu.
Father no necessary angry and no necessary ashamed
"Father, you don't have to be angry and you don't have to be ashamed."

Seng is also used with the reduplicated interrogative pronoun apa, meaning 'what', in a fixed expression to denote 'nothing', or 'not anything':

Seng apa-apa.
No REDUP~what
"It's nothing; it doesn't matter."

==== Tar/tra ====
Unlike all other Ambonese negators, tar/tra cannot form a one-word sentence. It is typically regarded as a marker of emphatic negation, and can be used alongside seng and with reduplication to achieve even greater emphasis. In the example below, ampas is reduplicated, following both negators seng and tra.

Ose nanti seng ampas, ose tra ampas lei!
2S wait no waste 2S no waste also
"You just wait; nothing, not even waste of you will remain (i.e. I won't spare you at all!)"

Tar/tra also commonly collocates with:

- existential verb ada 'be (somewhere)'
- bai 'good'
- modal auxiliary bole 'may, be allowed'

Tar ada uba tu!
no be medicine that
"There was no medicine at all!"

Dong seng piker akang, kata itu tar bae.
3P no think 3S.N CONJ that no good
"They don't think about it, <that is> that it is really bad."

Tar bole tu!
no may that
"You may not do that!"

==== Bal'ong/blong ====
Bal'ong marks both negation and the phasal aspect 'yet', denoting 'not yet'.

Dong su makang deng bal'ong gal'ap lai.
3P PHA eat and {not yet} dark also
"They have eaten and it isn't dark yet <so just let the children play outside>."

Similar to tar/tra it can also be used as a marker of emphatic negation alongside a reduplicated verb, as in the example below where bal'ong co-occurs with the reduplicated verb pulang-pulang:

An-ana tu, dong bilang: "E! Mama tu, ant'o bal'ong pulang-pulang."
REDUP~child that 3P say INTER mother that 3S {not yet} REDUP~return
"The children said: 'Hey, mother, she still has not come home yet.'"

==== Bukang ====
According to van Minde's research findings, bukang is the least commonly used negator in Ambonese Malay. It expresses a 'contrast which implies an alternative' - bukang X means 'not X (but on the contrary) Y)':

Dia tu bukang guru mar soldadu.
3S that no teacher but soldier
"He wasn't a teacher, but a soldier."

It may also occur in sentences with contrastive stress, combined with the use of 'higher pitch and articulatory strength' to articulate the constituents that are the focus of the negation. In the examples below, these specific constituents are capitalised to demonstrate prosodic emphasis:

Bukang seng BISA, seng DAPA dangsa deng nona-nona.
No no can no get dance with REDUP~girl
"Not that he COULD not (dance), he did not GET a dance(-partner) from among the girls."

==== Jangang/jang ====
Jangang does not occur in declarative or interrogative sentences but is used to express negative imperatives, as in the example below - 'don't go to China.'

Seng usa, jang pi di tan Cina.
No necessary don't go to land China
"That’s not necessary, don’t go to China."

It is also used in several 'short formulaic expressions':

Jang mira e.
Don't angry INTER
"Excuse me; Sorry."

Jang bilang lai!
Don't say also
"Incredible! Unbelievable! Terrible!"

==== Negators and common collocations ====
===== Lai =====
In the above example, the particle lai is used in sentence-final position as an exclamative marker. However, it can also be used with seng, bal'ong, and jangang in non-exclamative sentences to denote, 'anymore; again', or 'still':

De so seng mo pi deng beta lei.
3S PHA no FUT go with 1S also
"He won't go with me anymore."

Jang lei.
Don't also
"Don't do that anymore/again."

Bal'ong lei.
{Not yet} also
"Still not yet."

===== Ka =====
Ka combines with negators seng and bal'ong to form a sentence-final tag for interrogative sentences:

Se su makang ka blong?
2S PHA eat Q {not yet}
"Have you eaten already?"

Pap mara ka seng?
Father angry Q no
"Are you angry, or not?"

In the above example the tag ka seng has converted a yes–no question "Are you angry?" into an alternative question "Are you angry, or not?"

== Phonology ==
Ambonese Malay has phonemic word stress, by which is meant that the position of stress within a word is unforeseeable (van Minde 1997, p. 21) . Van Minde (1997, p. 22) uses the term “lexically reduplicated morphemes” which means that both of the roots that compose the morpheme contain an important (e.g. stressed) syllable. However, in the case of duplicated monosyllables, neither of the roots are perceptible as regards stress. Each accent on the syllables will be marked even if the morpheme is made up of a duplicated monosyllable. The reason being is to differentiate them from morphemes that are monomorphemic (van Minde 1997, p. 22). Examples of this would be (p. 22):

/g’igi/ ‘tooth’; /pomp’om/ in: /s’agu pomp’om/ k.o sago-cake roasted in cartridge-cases.

Compare the examples with the following (p. 23):

/’ eleK’ eleK/ ‘oil-lamp made from glass jar’; /t’omit’ omi/ k.o. cherry-like fruit.

Wordstress is the only different feature in a number of minimal pairs (p. 23):

/b’acaŋ/ Bacan (island) - /bac’aŋ/ k.o. fruit
/p’araŋ/ ‘machete’ - /par’aŋ/ ‘war’
/t’are/ ‘to attract s.t.’ - /tar’e/ ‘tight

=== Vowel phonemes ===
Ambonese contains 5 vowel phonemes as illustrated in the chart (van Minde 1997, p. 24):

Vowel system
	Front	Central	Back
High	i		u
Non-high	e	a	o

Ambonese Malay do not have phonemic glottal stop /ʔ/ but phonetically the glottal stop is noticed word-initially, morpheme-initially after a vowel, and morpheme-medially between like vowels (van Minde 1997, p. 24). Examples are (p. 24):

/’ose/ [ʔ’ ose] ‘you’
/baku’atur/ [baku#ʔ’atur] ‘to arrange with one another’

In addition, there might be borrowed words from other indigenous languages, there is individual variation, and [ʔ] is occasionally heard (van Minde 1997, p. 24):

/pa’isal/ [paʔ ‘isal] = [pa’isal] k.o. small proa;
/n’oul. [n’oʔul] = [n’oul] k.o. fish

Nasalised vowels happen expectedly before nasal consonants belonging to the same syllable. Due to this, van Minde considers nasalization as a “phonetic phenomenon”. He gave some examples as well (1997, pp. 24–25):

/’aNboŋ/ [ʔ’ām.bõŋ] ‘Ambon; Ambonese’
/kaNp’iNjaŋ/ [kãm.p’ĩñ.jãŋ] ‘churchbell’

Nasalisation is invalid past syllable-boundaries like for example (p. 24-25):

/an’ioŋ/ [ʔa.n’i.yõŋ] ‘rolled up cloth to support load carried on head’
/ba#’aNbur/ [ba. ʔ’āmbur] ‘to strew, scatter (repeatedly)

==== High front unrounded /i/ ====
According to van Minde (1997, p. 25), the high front unrounded vowel /i/ is always perceived as [i], and it always take place in non-final and final closed and open syllables. /i/ in final syllables (whether they are open or closed) can be replaced by /e/ however this only applies in some polysyllabic morphemes. Though /i/ can be replaced by /e/, it does not work in reverse thus it can’t be said the conflict between these two phonemes is negated in that position and environment (van Minde 1997, p. 25).

Besides position and stress, further restrictions on the alternation /i ≈ e/ is given in two phonological rules (PR). The change in final unstressed syllables of polysyllabic morphemes is not attested in (van Minde, 1997 p. 25):

PR_{1}: final syllables ending in /s/;

PR_{2}: open final syllables when the penultimate syllable contains /u/ or /i/

Van Minde (1997, p. 25) regards /i/ as a ‘heavy phoneme’ wherever there is a change /i ~ e/, which means in environments that are different from those interpreted by PR_{1} and PR_{2}. The definition of ‘heavy phoneme’ is defined as “consists of one or more optional distinctive features in addition to the basic distinctive features, whereas a basic phoneme consists of basic distinctive features only” (Ebeling 1967; Stokhof 1975). Van Minde deduces that /i/ is a heavy phoneme in environments excluded by PR_{1} and PR_{2}; /e/ being its basic phoneme and [relative highness] is a voluntary feature. Examples are given in the following (p. 25):

/katiNd’isaŋ/ [katĩnd’isāŋ] ‘to talk or rave while sleep’
/ir/ [ʔir] ‘drunk’

- closed final syllables (p. 26):

/k’ukis/ [k’ukis *k’ukes] ‘biscuit’
/kac’il/ [kac’il *kac’el] ‘small’

- open final syllables (p. 26):

/p’uti/ [p’uti *p’ute] ‘white’
/h’ari ≈ h’are/ ‘day’

==== Mid front unrounded vowel /e/ ====
The mid front unrounded vowel /e/ is perceived as [e] (or [ē] due to nasalization). Examples are followed (p. 26):

/b’esi/ [b’esi] ‘iron/steel’
/b’erkaT/ [b’erkat-] ‘divine blessing’

The phonemic status of /e/ versus /i/ is attested by the followed minimal pairs (p. 26):

/’ina/ ‘mother’ - /’ena/ ‘tasty, delicious’
/p’ici/ ‘to peel’ - /p’eci/ ‘mud’

The examples illustrated distinctly that /i/ is resistant to /e/ in morpheme-final syllables, hence the change /i ≈ e/ in final syllables under the previous restrictions stated in the phonological rules cannot be clarified as neutralization (van Minde 1997, pp. 26–27).

==== Low central vowel /a/ ====
The low central vowel in Ambonese Malay is perceived as [a] (or [ā] due to nasalization). Examples are followed (p. 27):

/’añer/ [ʔ’añer] ‘bad fishy smell’
/kal’apa/ [kal’apa] ‘coconut’

The minimal pairs attest the resistance between /a/ and /i/ (p. 27):

/s’atu/ ‘one’ - /s’itu/ ‘there’
/bal’a/ ‘to split s.t.’ - /bal’i/ ‘to buy s.t.’

The opposition between /a/ and /e/ is shown by the presented minimal pairs (p. 27):

/cak’a/ ‘to strangle s.o.’ - /cak’e/ ‘(vulg) to eat, stuff o.s.’
/b’aca/ ‘to read’ - /b’eca/ ‘pedicab’

==== High back rounded vowel /u/ ====
/u/ happens in non-final and final closed and open position. This high back rounded vowel is always perceived as [u] (or [ũ] due to nasalization). However, /u/ in final unstressed syllables (whether open or closed) consistently alternates with /o/ when in certain polysyllabic morphemes (van Minde 1997, p. 27). In addition, not all /o/ in this position and environment alternates with /u/, thus these two phonemes are not balanced. According to van Minde (1997, p. 27), the change /u ≈ o/ in final unstressed syllables of polysyllabic morphemes is not proven in (p. 27):

PR_{3}: open final syllables when the penultimate syllable have /u/ or /i/

This situation is alike to the change between the high and mid front vowels /i ≈ e/, where /u/ is seen as a heavy phoneme, /o/ as the basic phoneme and [relative phoneme] is the optional feature. The following examples prove this assertion (p. 28):

/t’obu/ [t’obu] ≈ /t’obo/ [t’obo] ‘sugar cane’
/’uNpaŋ/ [ʔ’ ũmpãŋ] ‘bait’

- Closed final syllables (p. 28):

/c’aNpur ≈ c’aNpor/ ‘to mix’
/c’abuT ≈ c’aboT/ ‘let’s go!’

- Open final syllables (p. 29):

/tapar’egu ≈ tapar’ego/ ‘to do s.t. hurriedly’
/cap’atu ≈ cap’ato/ ‘shoe’

- Minimal pairs shown to the resistance between /u/ and /i/ (p. 29):

/k’utu/ ‘louse’ - /k’uti/ ‘snap’
/g’ula/ ‘sugar’ - /g’ila/ ‘mad’

- The resistance between /u/ and /e/ can be shown by (p. 29):

/b’ulaŋ/ ‘moon, month’- /b’elaŋ/ in: /aruNb’ aI b’elaŋ/ k.o. large proa

The resistance between /u/ and /a/ is attested by:

/’uru/ ‘to massage’ – /’aru/ ‘Aru Islands’

==== Mid back rounded vowel /o/ ====
The mid back rounded vowel /o/ is seen as [o] (or [õ] due to nasalization). Examples are followed (p. 29):

/’oraŋ/ [‘orãŋ] ‘man, human being’
/b’odo/ [b’odo] ‘stupid’

- The minimal pair show the phoneme status of /o/ vis-à-vis /i/ (p. 30):

/b’oŋko/ ‘bowed (of persons)’ – /b’eŋko/ ‘bend sideways (of persons)’

- The phoneme status of /o/ against /a/ is shown by (p. 30):

/kat’oŋ/ ‘we’ - /kat’ aŋ/ ‘crab’

- The resistance between /o/ and /u/ is proven by (p. 30):

/h’ori/ ‘to wander about’ – /h’uri/ ‘having lost its original shape’

==== Archiphoneme /U/ ====
Archiphoneme /U/ is proposed in unstressed position after a vowel other than /u/ and instantly before a syllable or morpheme boundary by van Minde (1997). This is because there is no opposition between /u/ and /w/ in this environment (p. 31):

/l’aUtaŋ/ [l’autãŋ] ‘deep-sea’

The second reason proposed by van Minde (1997, p. 32) is that /U/ occurs after a consonant and directly before a stressed vowel (p. 32):

/bU’aya/ [bu’aya] ‘crocodile’

Nevertheless, not every pattern /Cw’V/ is collateral by a sequence /CU’V/ (p. 32):

/swaK/ [swak-] ‘weak, feeble’

==== Archiphoneme /I/ ====
This results from the neutralization of the resistance /i/-/y/ in unstressed position after a vowel or instantly before a stressed vowel (p. 32):

/m’uI/ [m’ui, muy] ‘aunt’

- Van Minde (1997, p. 32) showed some examples of /I/ before a stressed vowel:

/I’a/ [I’a, iy’a] ‘yes (formal)’
/bI’asa/ [bi’asa] ‘normal, usual’

- The resistance of /i/ and /y/ is shown by (p. 33):

/t’iU/ [t’iyu] ‘uncle’

=== Consonants ===
There are 19 consonants phonemes and 4 consonant archiphonemes in Ambonese Malay and they are charted below (van Minde 1997, pp. 40–41):

Consonant system
	Labial	Alveolar	Palatal	Velar	Glottal
Archiphoneme	P	T	N		K
Stop	p b	t d	c j	k g	
Nasal	m	n	ñ	ŋ	
Fricative	f	s			h
Liquid		l, r			
Semivowel	w		y		

==== Archiphonemes /P, T, K, N/ ====
These archiphonemes are a consequence from the neutralization of the opposition between /p/- /b/, /t/-/d/, and /k/-/g/ respectively in two positions and under certain conditions (van Minde 1997, p. 40):

1. Frequency of /P, T, K/ is especially high in word-final position. Most words with /P, T, K/ in this position are borrowed words from Dutch (van Minde 1997, p. 41). This is due to the many words of Malay origin to have lost final stops *p, *t, *k, or *ʔ. Example: *tutup > tutu ‘to close’.

Wordfinally the archiphonemes /P, T, K/ have a voiceless unreleased realization. Examples are shown (p. 41):

/keP/ [kep-] ‘notch, nick’ (<Dukeep)
/’aNbaK/ [ʔ’ãmbak-] ‘character, habit’

A significant number of polysyllabic words with non-final stress have a doublet without final /P, T, K/ in non emphatic speech (p. 41):

/r’unuT ≈ runu/ ‘fibroid material growing on palm trees’

In addition, van Minde (1997, p. 42) states that /P, T, K/ are “heavy archiphonemes” in this position and environment.

2. The archiphonemes /P, T, K/ have a voiceless unreleased realization in syllable-final position right before a stop, a nasal, fricative /s/, or the lateral /l/. Example is shown (p. 42):

/b’aKso/ [b’ak-so] ‘(Chinese) meatball’

Archiphoneme /N/ is also developed from the neutralization of the opposition between /m, n, ñ/ and /ŋ/ before their own homorgonaic obstruents /l/ (van Minde 1997, p. 42). Example is followed (p. 42):

/naNl’ohi/ [nãnl’ohi] Nanlohi (clan name)

==== Stops ====
The voiceless and voiced stops of the series /p, b, t, d, c, j, k, g/ are found in word-medial position and word-initial. /p, b/ are bilabials, /d/ is an apico-alveolar, /c, j/ are laminal-palatals, /t/ is an apico-alveodental, /k, g/ are dorsal-velars. Relevant (near) minimal pairs are shown below (van Minde 1997, pp. 43–44):

- p: b /t’aNpa/ ‘place stop’; /t’aNba/ ‘to add s.t.’
- p: t /p’aku/ ‘nail’; /t’aku/ ‘afraid’
- p:d /b’apa/ ‘term of address’; /bad’a/ ‘skin powder’
- p:c /p’ipi/ ‘cheek’; /p’ici/ ‘to give money’
- p:j /p’ari/ ‘ray (fish)’; /j’ari/ ‘finger’
- p:k /p’ele/ ‘to obstruct’; /k’ele/ ‘to press under arm’
- p:g /p’araŋ/ ‘machete’; /g’araŋ/ ‘salt’
- b:t /b’aru/ ‘new’; /t’aru/ ‘to place’
- b:d /b’apa/ ‘term of address’; /d’apa/ ‘to obtain’
- b:c /b’ole/ ‘may’; /c’ole/ ‘bodice’
- b:j /b’aNbaŋ/ ‘to warn’; /j’aNbaŋ/ ‘beard’
- b:k /b’ore/ ‘poisonous extract’; /k’ore/ ‘to fumble’
- b:g /b’aru/ ‘new’; /g’aru/ ‘to scratch’
- t:d /t’ulaŋ/ ‘bone’; /d’ulaŋ/ ‘wooden tray’
- t:c /t’ari/ ‘dance’; /c’ari/ ‘to search’
- t:j /t’ari/ ‘dance’; /j’ari/ ‘finger’
- t:k /t’anaŋ/ ‘to plant’; /k’anaŋ/ ‘right (side)’
- t:g /t’ali/ ‘rope’; /g’ali/ ‘to dig’
- d:c /d’aro/ ‘from’; /c’ari/ ‘to search’
- d:j /d’aro/ ‘from’; /j’ari/ ‘finger’
- d:k /d’aki/ ‘dirt’; /k’aki/ ‘foot’
- d:g /d’oti/ ‘to work magic’; /g’oti/ ‘trough for preparing sago’
- c:g /c’ari/ ‘search’; /j’ari/ ‘finger
- c:k /coK/ ‘choke’; /koK/ ‘owl’
- c:g /c’ili/ ‘chili’; /g’ilig’ili/ ‘tickle’
- j:k /j’aNji/ ‘to agree’; /k’aNji/ ‘starch’
- j:g /j’aga/ ‘to keep watch’; /g’aga/ ‘beautiful’
- k:g /k’araŋ/ ‘coral’; /g’araŋ/ ‘salt’

In certain lexical items there is an unexplained change between the voiceless stop and its homorganic voiced counterpart (van Minde 1997, p. 44):

/cigulu/ = /jigulu/ ‘riddle’

==== Nasals ====
The nasals /m, n, ñ, ŋ/ are separated on the basis of the following (near-) minimal pairs (van Minde 1997, pp. 44–45):

- m:n /m’ani/ ‘bead’; /n’ani/ ‘bamboo hoe’
- m:ñ /m’adu/ ‘honey’; /ñ’adu/ ‘brother/sister in-law’
- m:ŋ /m’ana/ ‘where’; /ŋ’ana/ ‘(inter.) gee!’
- n:ñ /ne/ in /b’ubur ne/ k.o. porridge; /ñe/ in” /m’uka m’acaŋ ñe/ ‘look disappointed’
- m:ŋ /’ina/ ‘mother’; /’iŋa/ ‘to remember’
- ñ:ŋ /t’aña/ ‘to ask’; /t’eŋa/ ‘middle’

The prevalence and functional load of these nasal contrasts differently. They occur word-initially and word-medially before vowels. However, in the environment of word-initially, the functional load of /ñ/ and /ŋ/ is low. Examples are shown (van Minde 1997, p. 45):

/ñ’amu/ [ñ’amu] ‘mosquito’
/ñoŋ/ [ñõŋ] ‘term of address for boys’

In morpheme-final position, nasals other than /ŋ/ are barely proven and thus van Minde (1997, p. 46) finds it hard to find minimal pairs that are different in morpheme-final nasal phoneme.

==== Fricatives ====
The labio-dental fricative /f/ occurs only in borrowed words and in words of unknown origin. Examples are shown (van Minde 1997, p. 46):

/f’ader/ [f’ader] ‘term of address for men’

The alveolar fricative /s/ occurs in word-initial, -medial, and –final position. Examples are shown (p. 47):

/saw’aI/ [saw’ai] ‘awry’
/rab’us/ [rab’us] ‘to boil’

The glottal fricative /h/ occurs word-medially and word-initially. However, in the use of interjections such as /ih/ ‘Hey!’ and /ah/ ‘Oh no!’- /h/ occur word-finally (van Minde 1997, p. 47) .

Also, word-medial /h/ is optional in certain words; when /h/ is removed between like vowels, one of the two adjacent vowel segments is also deleted. Examples are illustrated below (p. 47):

/bah’asa/ ≈ /basa/ ‘language’
/mas’ohi/ ≈ /mas’oI/ ‘mutual aid’

==== Liquids ====
The liquids /l/ and /r/ occur in word-initial, -medial, -final position, just like the alveolar fricative /s/. Example is shown (van Minde 1997, p. 48):

/t’ari/ [t’ari] ‘dance’

==== Semivowels ====
The semivowels /w/ and /y/ occur in word-initial and word-medial position before a vowel. Example are shown below (van Minde 1997, p. 48):

/hay’al/ [hay’al] ‘to flirt’
/kal’uyu/ [kal’uyu] ‘shark’

== Samples ==
Article 1 of the Universal Declaration of Human Rights in Ambonese:

Samua orang dilahirkan merdeka deng pung martabat deng hak-hak yang sama. Dorang dapa karunia akal deng hati nurani deng hendaknya batamang satu deng yang laeng dalam semangat basodara.

Article 1 of the Universal Declaration of Human Rights in English:

All human beings are born free and equal in dignity and rights. They are endowed with reason and conscience and should act towards one another in a spirit of brotherhood.

=== Examples ===
- Beta pung nama Ahmad = My name is Ahmed
- Ose su tau Ahmad pung maitua? = Do you know Ahmed's wife?
- Jang bakudapa deng dia dolo, dia ada gagartang deng ose = Don't meet with him for a moment, he's angry with you.
- Susi dong pung kaka mo pi kamari = Susi's brother will come
- Ini beta kasi akang voor ose = This is for you.
- Ale badiang jua, beta cumang mo tipu-tipu. Tuang Ala = Shut up, I am just tricking them. god! ('god!' as in swearing. eg. 'jesus christ!)
- Beta seng tau = I don't know

Ambonese word samples:

- Beta = I
- Ose, Ale = you (ose is derived from the Portuguese voce)
- Dia = he, she
- Akang = (may) it
- Katong = we (cut from kita orang)
- Dong = they (cut from dia orang)
- Kamong, kamorang = you (pl) (cut from kamu orang)
- Antua = he, she (respectful form)
- iyo = yes
- seng = no
- bakubae = peace
- nanaku = pay attention to something
- su = already (indicating something has already happened or has been done)

== See also ==
- North Moluccan Malay
- Papuan Malay
- Serui Malay
