= List of districts of Maluku =

The province of Maluku in Indonesia is divided into nine regencies (kabupaten) and two independent cities (kota); these in turn are divided administratively into 118 districts known as Kecamatan. The 118 districts of Maluku, with the regency or city each falls into, are as follows:

- Air Buaya, Buru
- Amahai, Maluku Tengah
- Amalatu, Seram Bagian Barat
- Ambalau, Buru Selatan
- Aru Selatan, Kepulauan Aru
- Aru Selatan Timur, Kepulauan Aru
- Aru Selatan Utara, Kepulauan Aru
- Aru Tengah, Kepulauan Aru
- Aru Tengah Selatan, Kepulauan Aru
- Aru Tengah Timur, Kepulauan Aru
- Aru Utara, Kepulauan Aru
- Aru Utara Timur Batuley, Kepulauan Aru
- Baguala, Ambon
- Banda, Maluku Tengah
- Bata Bual, Buru
- Bula, Seram Bagian Timur
- Bula Barat, Seram Bagian Timur
- Damer, Maluku Barat Daya
- Dawelor Dawera, Maluku Barat Daya
- Elpaputih, Seram Bagian Barat
- Fena Fafan, Buru Selatan
- Fena Leisela, Buru
- Fordata, Kepulauan Tanimbar
- Gorom Timur, Seram Bagian Timur
- Hoat Sorbay, Maluku Tenggara
- Huamual, Seram Bagian Barat
- Huamual Belakang, Seram Bagian Barat
- Inamosol, Seram Bagian Barat
- Kairatu, Seram Bagian Barat
- Kairatu Barat, Seram Bagian Barat
- Kei Besar, Maluku Tenggara
- Kei Besar Selatan, Maluku Tenggara
- Kei Besar Selatan Barat, Maluku Tenggara
- Kei Besar Utara Barat, Maluku Tenggara
- Kei Besar Utara Timur, Maluku Tenggara
- Kei Kecil, Maluku Tenggara
- Kei Kecil Barat, Maluku Tenggara
- Kei Kecil Timur, Maluku Tenggara
- Kei Kecil Timur Selatan, Maluku Tenggara
- Kepala Madan, Buru Selatan
- Kepulauan Manipa, Seram Bagian Barat
- Kepulauan Romang, Maluku Barat Daya
- Kian Darat, Seram Bagian Timur
- Kilmury, Seram Bagian Timur
- Kisar Utara, Maluku Barat Daya
- Kormomolin, Kepulauan Tanimbar
- Kota Masohi, Maluku Tengah
- Kur Selatan, Tual
- Leihitu, Maluku Tengah
- Leihitu Barat, Maluku Tengah
- Leitimur Selatan, Ambon
- Leksula, Buru Selatan
- Lilialy, Buru
- Lolong Guba, Buru
- Manyeuw, Maluku Tenggara
- Mdona Hiera, Maluku Barat Daya
- Moa Lakor, Maluku Barat Daya
- Molu Maru, Kepulauan Tanimbar
- Namlea, Buru
- Namrole, Buru Selatan
- Nirunmas, Kepulauan Tanimbar
- Nusa Laut, Maluku Tengah
- Nusaniwe, Ambon
- Pulau Gorom, Seram Bagian Timur
- Pulau Haruku, Maluku Tengah
- Pulau Lakor, Maluku Barat Daya
- Pulau Letti, Maluku Barat Daya
- Pulau Masela, Maluku Barat Daya
- Pulau Pulau Aru, Kepulauan Aru
- Pulau Dullah Selatan, Tual
- Pulau Dullah Utara, Tual
- Pulau Panjang, Seram Bagian Timur
- Pulau-Pulau Babar, Maluku Barat Daya
- Pulau-Pulau Babar Timur, Maluku Barat Daya
- Pulau-Pulau Kur, Tual
- Pulau-Pulau Terselatan, Maluku Barat Daya
- Pulau Wetang, Maluku Barat Daya
- Sala Hutu, Maluku Tengah
- Saparua, Maluku Tengah
- Saparua Timur, Maluku Tengah
- Selaru, Kepulauan Tanimbar
- Seram Barat, Seram Bagian Barat
- Seram Timur, Seram Bagian Timur
- Seram Utara, Maluku Tengah
- Seram Utara Barat, Maluku Tengah
- Seram Utara Timur Kobi, Maluku Tengah
- Seram Utara Timur Seti, Maluku Tengah
- Sirimau, Ambon
- Siritaum Wida Timur, Seram Bagian Timur
- Sir-Sir, Kepulauan Aru
- Siwalalat, Seram Bagian Timur
- Tanimbar Selatan, Kepulauan Tanimbar
- Tanimbar Utara, Kepulauan Tanimbar
- Taniwel, Seram Bagian Barat
- Taniwel Timur, Seram Bagian Barat
- Tayando Tam, Tual
- Tehoru, Maluku Tengah
- Tehoru Elpaputih, Maluku Tengah
- Telutih, Maluku Tengah
- Teluk Ambon, Ambon
- Teluk Kaiely, Buru
- Teluk Waru, Seram Bagian Timur
- Teon Nila Serua, Maluku Tengah
- Teor, Seram Bagian Timur
- Tutuk Tolu, Seram Bagian Timur
- Ukar Sengan, Seram Bagian Timur
- Waeapo, Buru
- Waelata, Buru
- Waesama, Buru Selatan
- Wakate, Seram Bagian Timur
- Waplau, Buru
- Wer Maktian, Kepulauan Tanimbar
- Werinama, Seram Bagian Timur
- Wer Tamrian, Kepulauan Tanimbar
- Wetar, Maluku Barat Daya
- Wetar Barat, Maluku Barat Daya
- Wetar Timur, Maluku Barat Daya
- Wetar Utara, Maluku Barat Daya
- Wuar Labobar, Kepulauan Tanimbar

== Villages ==
Administrative villages (desa) listed for each district:

| City/Regency | District | Languages in district | Administrative villages |
|---|---|---|---|
| Ambon | Baguala | | Halong, Lateri, Latta, Nania, Negeri Lama, Passo, Waiheru |
| Ambon | South Leitimur | | Ema, Hatalai, Hukurila, Hutumury (Hutumuri), Kilang, Leahari, Naku, Rutong |
| Ambon | Nusaniwe (Nusanive) | | Amahusu, Benteng, Kudamati, Latuhalat, Mangga Dua, Nusaniwe, Nusaniwe (Kelurahan Nusaniwe), Seilale, Silale, Urimessing (Urimesing) Desa, Urimessing (Urimesing) Kelurahan, Waihaong, Wainitu (Wainatu) |
| Ambon | Sirimau | | Ahusen, Amantelu, Batu Gajah (Batu Gaja / Batugajah), Batu Meja, Batu Merah, Galala, Hative Kecil, Honipopu, Karang Panjang, Pandan Kasturi, Rijali, Soya, Uritetu, Waihoka |
| Ambon | Teluk Ambon | | Hative Besar, Hunuth (Durian Patah), Laha, Poka, Rumah Tiga, Tawiri, Tihu, Wayame |
| Buru | Air Buaya | | Air Buaya, Awilinan, Bara, Batlale, Kampung Baru, Selwadu, Tanjung Karang, Waimangit (Waemangit), Waipure (Waepure), Wasbaka |
| Buru | Batabual | | Batu Jungku, Ilath, Namlea Ilath, Pela, Waemorat |
| Buru | Fena Leisela | | Balbalu, Lemanpoli, Raheriat, Waedanga, Waekose, Waelana-lana, Waemite, Waereman, Wainibe (Waenibe), Wamana Baru, Wamlana, Wasi, Waspait |
| Buru | Lilialy | | Jikumarasa (Jikumerasa), Sawa, Ubung, Waeperang, Waimiting (Waemiting) |
| Buru | Lolong Guba | | Grandeng, Kubalahin, Lele, Nafrua, Ohilahin, Tifu, Wabloy, Waegeren, Wanakarta, Wapsalit |
| Buru | Namlea | | Batu Boy, Jamilu, Karang Jaya, Lala, Namlea, Sanleko, Siahoni |
| Buru | Teluk Kaiely | | Kaiely (Kayeli), Kaki Air, Masarete, Seith, Waelapia |
| Buru | Waeapo | | Gogorea, Savana Jaya, Waekasar, Waekerta, Waenetat, Waetele, Wanareja |
| Buru | Waelata | | Basalale, Dava, Deboway / Debowae, Parbulu, Waehata, Waeleman, Waelo, Waetina, Waflan, Widit |
| Buru | Waplau | | Hatawano, Lamahang, Namsina, Samalagi, Skikilale, Waepotih, Waeura, Wailihang (Waelihang), Waplau, Waprea |
| South Buru | Ambalau | | Elara, Kampung Baru, Lumoy, Masawoy, Selasi, Siwar, Ulima |
| South Buru | Fena Fafan | | Fakal, Mangeswaen, Nusarua, Siwatlahin, Trukat, Uneth, Waekatin, Waeken, Waelo, Waereman (Waeraman) |
| South Buru | Kepala Madan | | Air Ternate, Bala-bala, Balpetu, Batu Layar, Biloro, Emguhen (Emhugen), Fogi, Nanali, Pasir Putih, Sekat, Siopot, Waeha, Waekeka, Waepandan, Walbele |
| South Buru | Leksula | | Ewiri (Erwiri), Grahwaen, Kase, Leksula, Liang, Mepa, Nalbessy, Neath, Slealale, Terkuri, Tifu, Waehaka, Waemala, Waemulang, Waenamaolon, Waeturen, Wahaolon, Walunghelat, Wewali |
| South Buru | Namrole | | Batu Tulis, Elfule, Fatmite, Kamlanglale, Labuang, Lektama, Leku, Masnana, Namrinat, Oki Baru, Oki Lama, Tikbary, Waefusi, Waenalut, Waenono, Wali, Wamkana |
| South Buru | Waesama | | Batu Kasa, Hote, Lena, Pohon Batu, Simi, Waelikut, Waemasing, Waesili, Waetawa, Waeteba (Waetaba), Wamsisi |
| Aru Islands | Aru Selatan | | West Doka, East Doka, Fatural, Feruni, Gaimar, Jelia, Jerol, Kabalukin, Kalar-Kalar, Laininir, Lor-lor, Marfenfen (Marafenfen), Ngaibor, Ngaiguli, Popjetur |
| Aru Islands | Aru Selatan Timur | | Batugoyang, Beltubur, Dosimar, Gomar Meti (Gomarmeti), Gomar Sungai (Gomarsungai), Jorang, Karey, Meror, Salarem, Siya |
| Aru Islands | Aru Selatan Utara | | Erersin, Hokmar, Juring, Lutur, Maekor, Rebi, Tabarfane |
| Aru Islands | Aru Tengah | | Algadang, Benjina, Fatlabata, Gardakau, Gulili, Irloy, Jirlay, Kobadangar, Kobasel Fara, Kobasel Timur, Kwarbola, Lorang, Maijuring, Manjau, Maririmar, Murai, Namara, Papakula, Selibata-Bata, Selilau, Tanah Miring, Wakua |
| Aru Islands | Aru Tengah Selatan | | Apara, Bemun, Gomo Gomo, Jambu Air, Longgar, Mesiang, Warabal |
| Aru Islands | Aru Tengah Timur | | Balatan, Basada, Dosinamalau, Kaiwabar, Karawai (Karawain), Kobror, Koijabi, Lola, Mariri, Ponom, Wailay, Warjukur, Warloy |
| Aru Islands | Aru Utara | | Foket, Jerwatu, Kabufin, Kaibolafin, Kolamar, Marlasi, Mesidang, Selmona, Tasinwaha (Tasin Waha), Wahangula-Ngula (Wahangulangula), Wahayum / Wahayun, Warialau |
| Aru Islands | Aru Utara Timur Batuley | | Batulei (Batuley), Benjuring, Jursiang, Kabalsiang, Kobamar, Kompane, Kumul, Sewer, Waria |
| Aru Islands | Pulau-Pulau Aru | | Durjela, Galai Dubu, Gorar, Jabulenga, Karangguli, Kobraur, Lau-Lau, Nafar (Napar), Samang, Siwa Lima (Siwalima), Tungu, Tunguwatu, Ujir, Wangel, Wokam |
| Aru Islands | Sir-Sir | | Bardefan (Berdefan), Goda Goda, Gomsey, Kolaha, Langhalau, Leiting, Mohongsel, Wafan, Waiful (Waifual) |
| Southwest Maluku | Damer | | Batu Merah (Batumerah), Bebar Timur, Ilih, Kehli, Kuaimelu (Kuay Melu), Kumur, Wulur |
| Southwest Maluku | Dawelor Dawera | | Ilmarang, Letmasa, Nurnyaman, Wairatan (Wiratan/Wiratang), Watuwey (Watuwei), Welora |
| Southwest Maluku | Romang Islands | | Hila, Jerusu, Solath |
| Southwest Maluku | North Kisar | | Labelau (Lebelau), Nomaha, Purpura (Pur-Pura) |
| Southwest Maluku | Mndona Hiera (Mdona Hyera / Hiera) | | Batugajah (Batu Gajah), Elo, Lelang, Luang Barat, Luang Timur, Mahaleta, Pupliora (Pupioliora), Regoha, Romdara, Rotnama, Rumkisar (Romkisar) |
| Southwest Maluku | Moa Lakor | | Kaiwatu, Klis, Moain, Patti, Tiakur, Tounwawan, Wakarleli, Werwaru |
| Southwest Maluku | Pulau Lakor | | Kety (Ketty), Letoda, Lolotwara (Lolotuara), Sera, Yamluli |
| Southwest Maluku | Pulau Leti / Letti (Leti Moa Lakor) | | Batumiau, Laitutun, Luhuely (Luhulely / Luhuleli), Nuwewang, Tomra, Tutukey, Tutuwaru |
| Southwest Maluku | Pulau Masela | | Babyotang (Babiotang), Bululora, Iblatmuntah, Ilbutung, Latalola Besar, Latalola Kecil, Lawawang, Marsela, Nura, Serili, Telalora - Letoda |
| Southwest Maluku | Pulau-Pulau Babar | | Hertuti, Imroing, Letsiara, Lewah, Sinairusi, Tela, Tepa, Wanuwui (Manuwui), Yaltubung |
| Southwest Maluku | Pulau-Pulau Terselatan | | Abusur, Kota Lama, Lekloor, West Oirata, East Oirata, Wonreli |
| Southwest Maluku | Pulau Wetang | | Herley (Herley Hoka), Nusiata, Pota Besar, Pota Kecil, Rumalewang Besar (Rumahlewang Besar), Rumalewang Kecil (Rumahlewang Kecil), Upuhupun (Upuhupu), Wasarili |
| Southwest Maluku | Pulau-Pulau Babar Timur | | Ahanari, Analutur, Emplawas (Empalwas), Kokwari, Kroing, Letwurung, Manuweri (Manuari), Nakarhamto, Tutuwawang, Wakpapapi, Yatoke |
| Southwest Maluku | Wetar | | Amau, Hiay, Ilputih, Ilwaki, Mahuan, Masapun |
| Southwest Maluku | West Wetar | | Ilmamau, Karbubu, Klishatu, Telemar, Ustutun |
| Southwest Maluku | East Wetar | | Arwala, Ilpokil, Ilway, Kahilin, Moning, Tomliapat |
| Southwest Maluku | North Wetar | | Elsulith, Eray, Lurang, Nabar, Naumatang, Uhak |
| Central Maluku | Amahai | | Amahai, Banda Baru, Haruru, Hatuhenu, Hollo, Makariki, Nua Nea, Nuweletetu, Rutah, Sehati, Sepa, Soahuku, Tamilouw, Yafila, Yainuelo |
| Central Maluku | Banda | | Boiyauw, Combir Kasestoren, Dender, Dwiwarna, Kampung Baru, Lautang, Lonthoir, Merdeka, Nusantara, Pulau Ay, Pulau Hatta, Pulau Rhun, Rajawali, Selamon, Tanah Rata, Uring Tutra, Waer, Walling Spanciby (Wailing Spanciby) |
| Central Maluku | Kota Masohi | | Ampera, Lesane, Letwaru, Namaelo, Namasina |
| Central Maluku | Leihitu | | Asilulu, Hila, Hitulama (Hitu Lama), Hitumessing (Hitu Mesing), Kaitetu, Mamala, Morella (Morela), Negeri Lima, Seith, Ureng, Wakal |
| Central Maluku | West Leihitu | | Allang, Hatu, Larike, Liliboy (Liliboi), Wakasihu |
| Central Maluku | Nusa Laut | | Abubu, Akoon, Ameth, Leinitu, Nalahia, Sila, Titawaai |
| Central Maluku | Pulau Haruku | | Aboru, Haruku, Hulaliu, Kabauw (Kabau), Kailolo, Kariu (Kariuw), Oma, Pelauw, Rohomoni, Sameth, Wassu |
| Central Maluku | Salahutu | | Liang, Suli, Tengah-Tengah, Tial, Tulehu, Waai |
| Central Maluku | Saparua | | Booi, Haria, Kulur, Paperu, Porto (Portho), Saparua, Tiouw |
| Central Maluku | East Saparua | | Iha, Ihamahu, Itawaka, Mahu, Nolloth (Noloth), Ouw, Siri Sori Islam (Siri Sori), Siri-Sori Amalatu, Tuhaha, Ullath |
| Central Maluku | Seram Utara | | Air Besar, Besi, Elemata, Hatuolo, Huaulu, Kaloa, Kanikeh, Malaku, Manusela, Maraina, Masihulan, Olong, Oping, Pasahari, Roho, Rumahsokat, Sawai, Siatele, Solea, Wahai |
| Central Maluku | Seram Utara Barat | | Gale-gale, Herlau Pauni, Horale, Karlutu Kara, Labuan, Latea, Lisabata Timur, Paa, Pasanea, Rumahwey, Saleman, Wailulu, Warasiwa |
| Central Maluku | Seram Utara Timur Kobi | | Kabauhari, Kobi, Kobimukti, Leaway, Maneo Rendah, Marasahua, Morokai, Samal, Sariputih, Waimusi, Waitonipa, Way Asih |
| Central Maluku | Seram Utara Timur Seti | | Aketernate, Kobisonta, Loping Mulyo, Namto, Seti, Tanah Merah, Tihuana, Wailoping, Waimusal, Waiputih, Waitila, Wonosari |
| Central Maluku | Tehoru | | Hatu, Hatumete, Haya, Mosso, Piliama (Piliana), Salamahu, Saunulu, Tehoru, Telutih Baru (Teluti Baru), Yaputih |
| Central Maluku | Teluk Elpaputih | | Liang, Sahulauw (Sahulau), Tananahu, Waraka |
| Central Maluku | Telutih | | Hunisi, Lafa, Laha, Laha Kaba (Lahakaba), Laimu, Maneoratu (Maneo Ratu), Tehua, Ulahahan, Wolu, Yamalatu |
| Central Maluku | Teon Nila Serua | | Ameth, Bumey, Isu (Issu), Jerili, Kokroman, Kuralele, Layeni, Lesluru, Mesa (Messa), Nakupia, Sefluru (Sifluru), Trana, Usliapan, Waru, Watludan, Wotay |
| Southeast Maluku | Hoat Sorbay | | Arso, Dian Darat, Dian Pulau, Evu, Letwuan (Letvuan), Madwat, Ngursit, Ohoibadar, Tetoat, Wab, Warwut, Watngil, Wirin |
| Southeast Maluku | Kei Besar | | Bombay, Daftel, Depur, El Ralang, Elat, Fako, Fangamas, Harangur, Karkarit, Ler Ohoilim, Mataholat, Nabaheng, Ngat, Ngefuit, Ngefuit Atas, Ngurdu, Ohoiel, Ohoilim, Ohoinangan, Ohoinangan Atas, Ohoiwait, Ohoiwang, Rahareng, Rahareng Atas, Reyamru, Sirbante, Soinrat, Udar, Wakol, Watsin, Watuar, Waur, Waur Tahit, Werka, Wermaf, Wulurat, Yamtel |
| Southeast Maluku | Kei Besar Selatan | | Kilwat, Larat, Nerong, Ohoirenan, Sathen (Sether/Sather), Soindat, Tamangil Nuhuten, Tamangil Nuhuyanat, Tutrean, Weduar |
| Southeast Maluku | Kei Besar Selatan Barat | | Feer, Hoat, Hoko, Ngafan, Ngan, Ngurko, Ohoilean, Rahangiar, Rerean, Uat, Wafol, Watkidat, Weduar Fer (Weduar Feer) |
| Southeast Maluku | Kei Besar Utara Barat | | Ad Ngurwul, Ad Ohoiwaf, Ad Wear Aur (Ad Wearaur), Dangarat, Faa, Hangur, Hoor Islam, Hoor Kristen, Laar (Laar Perda), Mun Essoy, Mun Kahar, Mun Ngurditwain, Mun Ohoiir, Mun Ohoitadiun (Mun Ohoitadium), Mun Werfan, Ngurwalek, Ohoituf, Uwat, Uwat Reyaan, Uwat Wear, Waer, Waerat, Weer Frawaf, Weer Ohoiker, Weer Ohoinam |
| Southeast Maluku | Kei Besar Utara Timur | | Banda Efruan, Banda Eli/Ely, Banda Suku Tigapuluh, Fanwav, Haar Ohoimel, Haar Ohoimur GPM, Haar Ohoimur RK, Haar Ohoiwait, Haar Renrahantel, Haar Wassar, Hoko, Hollat, Hollat Solair, Hollay, Kilwair, Langgiar Haar, Ohoifaruan, Ohoifau, Ohoimajang, Ohoiraut, Ohoiwirin, Renfaan GPM, Renfaan Islam, Renfan (Renfaan), Soin, Tuburlay, Tuburngil, Ur, Watlaar (Watlar), Yamtimur |
| Southeast Maluku | Kei Kecil | | Dudunwahan, Faan, Ibra, Kelanit, Kolser, Langgur, Letman, Loon, Ngabub, Ohoider Atas, Ohoidertawun (Ohodertawun), Ohoijang Watdek (Ohoijang / Ohoiyong Watdek), Sathean, Sitniohoi, Wearlilir |
| Southeast Maluku | Kei Kecil Barat | | Matwair (Madwaer), Ohoidertom, Ohoidertutu, Ohoira, Ohoiren, Somlain, Tanimbar Kei, Ur Pulau, Warbal, Yatwav |
| Southeast Maluku | Kei Kecil Timur | | Abean, Denwet, Disuk, Iso, Marfun, Mastur, Mastur Baru, Ohoilus, Ohoinol, Rat, Rewav, Rumaat, Semawi, Tenbuk, Wain, Wain Baru, Watngon, Yafavun |
| Southeast Maluku | Kei Kecil Timur Selatan | | Danar Lumefar, Danar Ohoiseb, Danar Ternate, Elaar Lamagorang, Elaar Let, Elaar Ngursoin, Garara, Maar, Ngurwul, Sare, Uf |
| Southeast Maluku | Manyeuw | | Debut, Lairngangas, Namar, Ngayub, Ngilngof, Ohoililir, Ohoiluk, Rumadian, Selayar |
| Tanimbar Islands | Kormomolin | | Alusi Batjasi, Alusi Bukjalim, Alusi Kelaan, Alusi Krawain, Alusi Tamrian, Kilmasa, Lorwembun, Lumasebu, Meyano Bab, Meyano Das |
| Tanimbar Islands | Molu Maru | | Adodo Molu (Adodo Molo), Nurkat, Tutunametal, Wadankou (Wadankau), Wulmasa |
| Tanimbar Islands | Nirunmas | | Arma, Manglusi, Tutukembong, Watmuri, Waturu |
| Tanimbar Islands | Selaru | | Adaut, Eliasa, Fursuy (Fursui), Kandar, Lingat, Namtabung, Werain |
| Tanimbar Islands | South Tanimbar | | Bomaki, Ilngei, Kabiarat (Kabiarat Raya), Latdalam, Lauran, Lermatang, Matakus, Olilit Raya (Olilit), Saumlaki, North Saumlaki, Sifnana, Wowonda |
| Tanimbar Islands | North Tanimbar | | Kelaan, Kilobar (Keliober), Lamdesar Barat, Lamdesar Timur, Lelingluan, Ridool, Ritabel, Watidal |
| Tanimbar Islands | Wer Maktian | | Batu Putih, Kamatubun, Makatian (Makatiang), Marantutul, Rumahsalut (Rumasalut), Themin, Welutu, Weratan, Wermatang |
| Tanimbar Islands | Wer Tamrian | | Amdasa, Arui Bab, Arui Das, Atubul Da, Atubul Dol, Lorulun, Sangliat Dol, Sangliat Krawain, Tumbur |
| Tanimbar Islands | Wuar Labobar | | Abat, Awear Rumngeur, Karatat, Kiloon, Labobar, Lingada, Romnus, Teineman, Wabar, Watmasa, Wunlah |
| Tanimbar Islands | Yaru | | Adodo Fordata, Awear, Romean, Rumngeur, Sofyanin, Walerang |
| West Seram | Amalatu | | Hualoy, Latu, Rumahkay, Seriholo, Tala, Tihulale, Tomalehu |
| West Seram | Elpaputih | | Abio Ahiolo, Elpaputih, Huku Kecil, Sanahu, Sumeith/Sameith Pasinaro, Wasia (Waisa), Watuy (Watui) |
| West Seram | Huamual | | Ariate, Iha, Kulur, Lokki, Luhu |
| West Seram | Huamual Belakang | | Allang Asaude, Buano Selatan (Boano Selatan), Buano Utara (Boano Utara), Sole, Tahalupu, Tonu Jaya, Waesala |
| West Seram | Inamosol | | Honitetu (Hunitetu), Hukuanakota (Huku Anakota), Manusa, Rambatu, Rumberu |
| West Seram | Kairatu | | Hatusua, Kairatu, Kamarian, Seruawan, Uraur, Waimital, Waipirit |
| West Seram | West Kairatu | | Kamal, Lohiatala, Nuruwe (Nurue), Waesamu (Waisamu), Waihatu, Waisarisa |
| West Seram | Manipa Islands | | Buano Hatuputih, Kelang Asaude, Luhutuban, Masawoy (Masawoi), Tomalehu Barat (Tumalehu Barat), Tomalehu Timur (Tumalehu Timur), Tuniwara |
| West Seram | West Seram | | Eti / Ety, Kaibobo (Kaibobu), Kawa, Lumoly (Lumoli), Morekau, Neniari / Niniari, Piru |
| West Seram | Taniwel | | Buria, Hulung, Kasieh, Laturake, Lisabata (Lisabata Barat), Lohiasapalewa (Lohia Sapalewa), Murnaten / Mornaten, Nikulukan, Niniari, Niwelehu, Nukuhai, Nuniali, Pasinalo, Patahuwe, Riring, Rumahsoal, Taniwel, Uweth / Uweh, Wakolo |
| West Seram | East Taniwel | | Hatunuru, Lumahlatal (Lumalatal), Lumahpelu (Lumapelu), Makububui, Maloang, Masihuwey (Musihbuway), Matapa, Seakasale (Soakasale), Sohuwe, Solea, Sukaraja, Tounusa, Uwen Pantai, Walakone, Waraloin |
| East Seram | Bula | | Bula, Bula Air Fatolo, Englas, Fattolo, Kampung Gorom, Kampung Wailola, Limumir, Salas, Sesar, Tansi Ambon |
| East Seram | West Bula | | Aki Jaya, Banggoi, Banggoi Pancorang, Dreamland Hills, Hote, Jakarta Baru, Jembatan Basah, Rukun Jaya, Silohan, Sumber Agung, Waematakabo, Waiketam Baru, Waisamet |
| East Seram | East Gorom | | Adar, Amarwatu, Aran, Armada, Bas, Basarin, Etaralu, Goha, Kilkoda, Kiltufa, Kota Sirih, Miran, Miran Gota, Miran Keledar, Miran Kilian, Miran Manaban, Miran Rumuar, Rarat, Sagey, Tinarin, Tuha, Tunas Ilur, Waisalan |
| East Seram | Kian Darat | | Angar, Artafela, Kelaba, Kian Darat, Kileser, Kilga Kilwouw, Kilga Watubau, Rumfakar, Rumoga, Watu Watu |
| East Seram | Kilmury | | Afang Defol, Afang Kota, Bitorik, Gunak, Kamar, Kilbon Kway, Kilmury, Kumelang, Mising, Nekan, Selor, Sumbawa, Taa, Undur |
| East Seram | Pulau Gorom | | Amarsekaru, Arewang, Aroa Kataloka, Buan Kataloka, Dada Kataloka, Day, Dulak, Ilili, Kaforing, Kataloka, Kelibingan, Kilalir Kilwouw, Kilean, Kilotak, Kulugowa, Loko, Mida, Namalean, Ondor, Rumanama Kotawouw Kataloka, Rumeon, Sera, Sikaro Kataloka, Usun Kataloka |
| East Seram | Pulau Panjang | | Argam, Lalasa, Magat, Perik Basaranggi, Pulau Panjang, Ruku Ruku |
| East Seram | East Seram | | Ainena, Akatfadedo, Geser, Guli-Guli, Keffing, Kellu, Kilfura, Kiltay, Kilwaru, Kwawor Besar Ena, Kwawor Besar Witau, Kwawor Kecil Mata Ata, Kwawor Kecil Mata Wawa, Manggis, Mugusinis, Urung |
| East Seram | Siritaun Wida Timur | | Air Nanang, Aruan Gaur, Keta, Keta Rumadan, Kian Laut, Kwaos (Kuwaos), Lian Tasik, Salagor Air, Salagor Kota, Suru |
| East Seram | Siwalalat | | Abulate, Adabai, Atiahu, Dihil, Elnusa, Lapela, Liliama, Naiwel Ahinulin, Nayet, Polin, Sabuai, Tunsai |
| East Seram | Teluk Waru | | Bellis, Boinfia, Dawang, Kampung Baru, Karay, Madak, Nama Andan, Nama Lena, Solang, Tubir Wasiwang, Waru |
| East Seram | Teor | | Duryar Rumoy, Kampung Baru, Kampung Tengah Wermaf, Karlokin, Kartutin Kartenga, Ker Ker, Kiliwouw, Lapang Kampung Jawa, Mamur, Teor |
| East Seram | Tutuk Tolu | | Airkasar, Bati Kilwouw, Danama, Gah, Kilbat, Kilmoy, Kufar, Sesar, Taruy, Walang Tenga, Waras-Waras |
| East Seram | Wakate | | Amarlaut, Effa, Guliar, Ilili, Karlomin, Kelangan, Keldor, Kilbutak, Kurwara, Lahema, Otademan, Ruma Durun, Tamher Timur, Tamher Warat, Tana Soa, Tanah Baru, Utta, Wunin Eldedora |
| East Seram | Werinama | | Batuasa, Bemo, Bemo Perak, Funa Naibaya, Gusalaut, Hatuimeten, Osong, Tobo, Tum, Werinama |
| Tual | South Kur | | Hirit, Kanara, Niela (Mangur Niela), Rumoin (Romoin), Tiflen (Tiflean), Warkar, Yapas |
| Tual | Pulau Dullah Selatan | | Ketsoblak, Lodar El (Lodar Ell), Masrum, Taar, Tual |
| Tual | Pulau Dullah Utara | | Dullah (Darat), Dullah Laut, Fiditan, Labetawi, Ngadi, Ohoitahit, Ohoitel, Tamedan |
| Tual | Pulau-Pulau Kur | | Finualen, Kaimear, Lokwirin, Sermaf, Tubyal |
| Tual | Tayando Tam | | Tam Ngurhir, Tayando Langgiar, Tayando Ohoiel, Tayando Yamru, Tayando Yamtel |
