= List of incumbent regional heads and deputy regional heads in Maluku =

The following is an article about the list of Regional Heads and Deputy Regional Heads in 11 regencies/cities in Maluku who are currently still serving.

== List ==
Regency/ City	Photo of the Regent/ Mayor	Regent/ Mayor	Photo of Deputy Regent/ Mayor	Deputy Regent/ Mayor	Taking Office	End of Office (Planned)	Ref.
Buru; Regency List of Regents/Deputy Regents		Ikram Umasugi		Sudarmo	26 May 2025	26 May 2030	
South Buru; Regency List of Regents/Deputy Regents		La Hamidi		Gerson Eliaser Selsily	20 February 2025	20 February 2030	
Aru Islands; Regency List of Regents/Deputy Regents		Timotius Kaidel		Mohamad Djumpa	20 February 2025	20 February 2030	
Tanimbar Islands; Regency List of Regents/Deputy Regents		Ricky Jauwerissa		Juliana Chatarina Ratuanak	20 February 2025	20 February 2030	
Southwest Maluku; Regency List of Regents/Deputy Regents		Benyamin Thomas Noach		Agustinus Lekwardai Kilikily	20 February 2025	20 February 2030	
Central Maluku; Regency List of Regents/Deputy Regents		Zulkarnain Awat Amir		Mario Lawalata	20 February 2025	20 February 2030	
Southeast Maluku; Regency List of Regents/Deputy Regents		Muhammad Thaher Hanubun		Charlos Viali Rahantoknam	20 February 2025	20 February 2030	
West Seram; Regency List of Regents/Deputy Regents		Asri Arman		Selfinus Kainama	20 February 2025	20 February 2030	
East Seram; Regency List of Regents/Deputy Regents		Fachri Husni Alkatiri		Muhammad Mifta Thoha	20 February 2025	20 February 2030	
Ambon; City List of Mayors/Deputy mayors		Bodewin Wattimena		Elly Toisutta	20 February 2025	20 February 2030	
Tual; City List of Mayors/Deputy mayors		Akhmad Yani Renuat		Amir Rumra	20 February 2025	20 February 2030	

Notes

- "Commencement of office" is the inauguration date at the beginning or during the current term of office. For acting regents/mayors, it is the date of appointment or extension as acting regent/mayor.
- Based on the Constitutional Court decision Number 27/PUU-XXII/2024, the Governor and Deputy Governor, Regent and Deputy Regent, and Mayor and Deputy Mayor elected in 2020 shall serve until the inauguration of the Governor and Deputy Governor, Regent and Deputy Regent, and Mayor and Deputy Mayor elected in the 2024 national simultaneous elections as long as the term of office does not exceed 5 (five) years.

== See also ==
- Maluku
