= Merah Putih Bridge =

Bridge in Indonesia

Merah Putih Bridge Jembatan Merah Putih
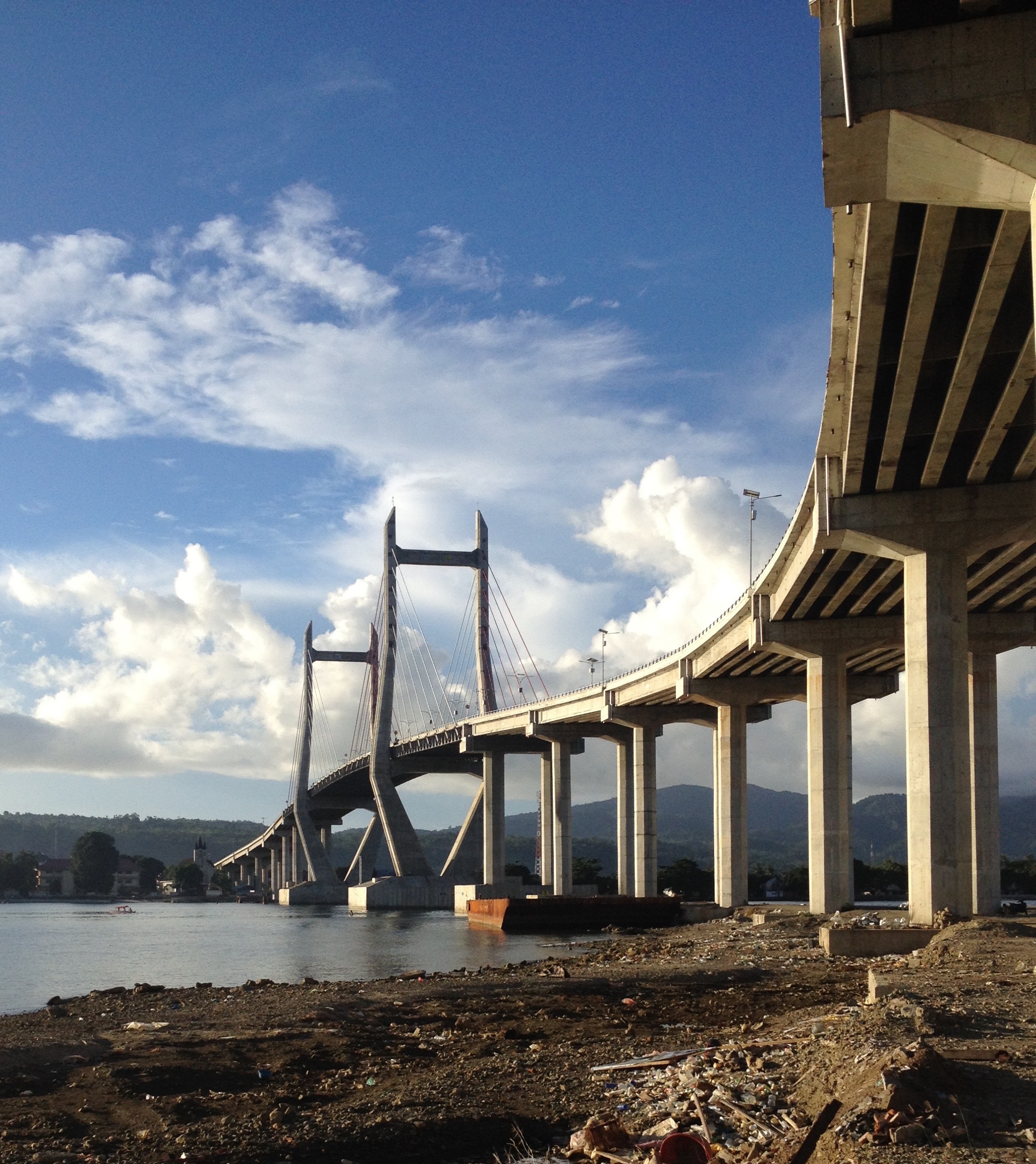
- Coordinates: 3°39′45″S 128°11′54″E
- Carries: Vehicle
- Crosses: Ambon Bay, Indonesia

Characteristics
- Design: cable stayed bridge box girder bridge
- Total length: 1,140 metres (3,740 ft)
- Width: 22.5 metres (74 ft)
- Longest span: 150 metres (492 ft)
- No. of spans: 3
- Clearance above: 34.109 metres (112 ft)

History
- Constructed by: PT Wijaya Karya, PT Pembangunan Perumahan
- Construction start: 17 July 2011
- Inaugurated: 4 April 2016

Statistics
- Toll: No

Location
- Interactive map of Merah Putih Bridge

Merah Putih Bridge (Indonesian: Jembatan Merah Putih) is a cable stayed bridge located in Ambon, Maluku, Indonesia. The bridge spans over Ambon Bay in Ambon Island, connecting Rumah Tiga village (Poka) in Sirimau sub-district on the north side, with Hative Kecil/Galala village in Teluk Ambon sub-district on the south side. This bridge is the longest bridge in the eastern region of Indonesia; it is the landmark of the city.

Construction began in 17 July 2011. Merah Putih Bridge cost the state budget (APBN) around Rp 779.2 billion (US 59.52 million dollar). The bridge was inaugurated by Indonesian President Joko Widodo on 4 April 2016.

The bridge was meant to cut travel time between Pattimura Airport on Leihitu Peninsula, Central Maluku Regency in the north, and downtown Ambon City on Lei Timur Peninsula in the south. Previously, before the construction and completion of Merah Putih Bridge, distance of Pattimura International Airport to Ambon city center is 35 kilometers must be taken approximately for 60 minutes drive around the Bay of Ambon. The alternative is to use a ferry between the Rumah Tiga village (Poka) and Galela takes about 20 minutes, not including queuing time.

== Technical description ==
Bay of Ambon is a narrow and deep bay that divide Ambon Island into two peninsulas; the larger Lei Hitu peninsula in the north and the Lei Timur peninsula in the south. Ambon Island region is a tectonic earthquake prone area. The length of the bridge is 1,140 meters which consist of three parts, the accessing bridge on Poka village side (north) spans 520 meters, the accessing bridge on Galala village side (south) spans 320 meters, the main bridge spans 300 meters. The main bridge is cable stayed bridge, with span between pylons measures 150 meters.

== Construction phases ==
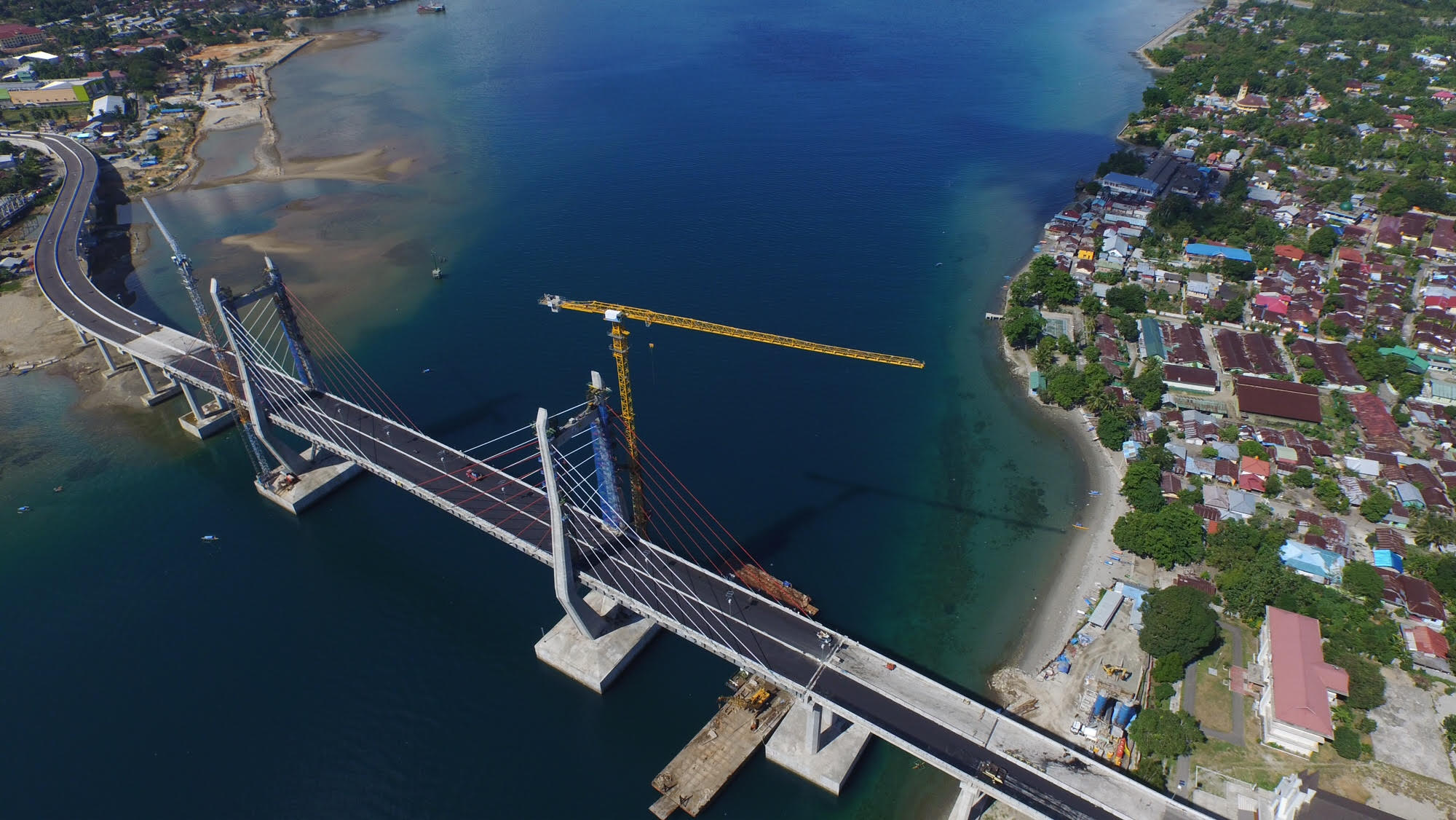
Merah Putih Bridge during its construction

Initially the bridge was estimated to cost around Rp 416.75 billion and was expected to be completed in 2014, however, this earlier schedule was not met as a result of weather problems which impeded the delivery of bridge materials. Per June 2015, 90% of the bridge is completed. The bridge construction process was delayed due to the earthquake that shook Ambon on December 29, 2015. The cost also grew to Rp 779.2 billion. The bridge was completed and inaugurated on 4 April 2016.

== Bridge's name ==
The bridge was named after the Bendera Merah Putih, the flag of Indonesia. But there is another meaning behind the naming this bridge. During the occurrence of sectarian conflict in Maluku in the period between 1999 and 2002, the Christian group was called the "red group", while Muslim group called the "white group". Thus the bridge was meant to become a symbol of peace, unity and solidarity among the Moluccans.
