= Hitu =

Hitu may refer to:

- Hitu people, an ethnic group of Ambon Island, Indonesia
- Hitu language, a language spoken by the Hitu people
