= Husnie Hentihu =

Indonesian politician (1950–2023)

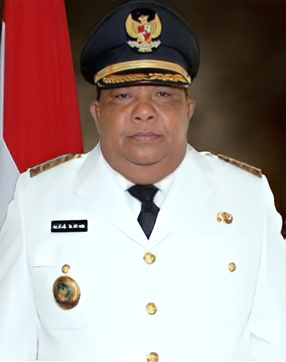
- Hentihu in 2010

1st Regent of Buru
- In office 2002–2012
- Deputy: Bakri Lumbessy; Ramly I. Umasugi
- Preceded by: R.S. Sangadji (acting)
- Succeeded by: Ramly I. Umasugi

Personal details
- Born: 20 August 1950 Buru, Maluku, Indonesia
- Died: 20 February 2023 (aged 72) Ambon, Maluku, Indonesia
- Education: University of Pattimura (Drs.)

Husnie Hentihu (20 August 1950 – 20 February 2023) was an Indonesian politician who served as the Regent of Buru from 2002 until 2012.

== Early life and education ==
Hentihu was born on 20 August 1950 in Wamlana, a small village in Buru, Maluku. Hentihu started his studies at the Wamlana People's School (equivalent to primary school) but dropped out in the 5th grade and moved to Ambon, the capital of Maluku. He finished primary school at the Al-Hilal Elementary School in 1964. He continued at state-run junior high school and high school and graduated in 1967 and 1970, respectively. He then entered the Faculty of Social and Political Sciences at the University of Pattimura. During his time in the university, Hentihu joined the Muslim Students' Association and became its local chairman from 1976 until 1979. Hentihu obtained a baccalaureate degree in 1976 and graduated from the university with a doctorandus in 1985.

== Career ==
Hentihu worked as a manager in several companies before being elected to the Central Maluku Regional People's Representative Council from Golkar in the 1992 elections. He was re-elected to the council for a second time in 1997. His second term, which was supposed to end in 2002, ended in 1999 due to the political developments following the fall of Suharto. He was then elected to the Maluku Regional People's Representative Council in the 1999 elections. Hentihu was the secretary of Golkar in Maluku around this time.

Several days after Hentihu's election to the Maluku Regional People's Representative Council, the government enacted the law which established the Buru Regency. The Maluku government then appointed Rusdi Sangadji as the acting regent. An election for a definitive regent was held on 6 September 2001, with Hentihu coming out as the winner, but several Buru local parliament members deemed it invalid. Another election was then held several months later and was won again by Hentihu. He was then installed as a regent around 2002. Hentihu's first term as regent saw a decrease in armed clashes that occurred due to the Maluku sectarian conflict. Despite this, Hentihu refused to revoke the civil emergency status in Buru, stating that the revocation might cause new clashes.

Before the end of his first term, Hentihu announced his intention to run again as a candidate for the Regent of Buru in the upcoming election. He picked Ramly Umasugi, who was serving as the speaker of Buru's parliament at that time, as his running mate. Hentihu and Umasugi was supported by Golkar and the pair managed to win the election. Hentihu's opponents protested his victory by claiming that Hentihu committed electoral fraud, and their supporters held a protest at the local electoral commission office.

Hentihu oversaw the formation of the South Buru regency during his tenure. Hentihu nominated Hakim Fatsey, one of his subordinates, as the regency's secretary. Hentihu's appointment of Fatsey to the South Buru regency was viewed as some sort of exile due to his mismanagement of the education agency in Buru. Hentihu's decision was soon protested by the South Buru populace and Hentihu was later imprisoned for the mismanagement. Hentihu's second term as regent ended on 2 February 2012.

In August 2016, a group of students named the Maluku Muslim Youth Front protested in front of the Corruption Eradication Commission, demanding Hentihu be investigated for his involvement in a corruption case. Hentihu was accused of embezzling funds during his tenure as regent.

== Personal life and death ==
Husnie Hentihu was married to Murniaty Sulaiman Hentihu and had five children. Murniaty Sulaiman Hentihu served as a Maluku Regional People's Representative Council member from 2014 until her death on 10 August 2021.

Hentihu died on 20 February 2023 at the Dr. Haulussy Regional Hospital in Ambon, Maluku. He was 72. Prior to his death, Hentihu had been treated for three days in hospital. His body was brought to Buru to be interred there.
