= Saunulu =

Village in Maluku, Indonesia

- Location in Maluku and Indonesia Saunulu (Indonesia)
- Coordinates: 3°10′50.8476″S 129°27′32.8716″E
- Country: Indonesia
- Province: Maluku
- Regency: Central Maluku Regency
- District: Tehoru District
- Elevation: 8,632 ft (2,631 m)

Population (2010)
  - Total: 1,172
- Time zone: UTC+9 (Indonesia Eastern Standard Time)

Saunulu is a village in Tehoru district, Central Maluku Regency in Maluku Province, Indonesia. Its population in 2010 was 1172.

== Climate ==
Saunulu has a cold subtropical highland climate (Cfb) with heavy rainfall year-round.

Climate data for Saunulu
Month	Jan	Feb	Mar	Apr	May	Jun	Jul	Aug	Sep	Oct	Nov	Dec	Year
Mean daily maximum °C (°F)	18.3 (64.9)	18.5 (65.3)	18.1 (64.6)	17.0 (62.6)	15.7 (60.3)	14.5 (58.1)	13.4 (56.1)	13.7 (56.7)	15.4 (59.7)	17.5 (63.5)	18.5 (65.3)	18.5 (65.3)	16.6 (61.9)
Daily mean °C (°F)	14.1 (57.4)	14.3 (57.7)	14.2 (57.6)	13.5 (56.3)	12.9 (55.2)	12.3 (54.1)	11.5 (52.7)	11.5 (52.7)	12.3 (54.1)	13.5 (56.3)	14.1 (57.4)	14.3 (57.7)	13.2 (55.8)
Mean daily minimum °C (°F)	10.0 (50.0)	10.1 (50.2)	10.3 (50.5)	10.1 (50.2)	10.2 (50.4)	10.1 (50.2)	9.7 (49.5)	9.3 (48.7)	9.3 (48.7)	9.5 (49.1)	9.7 (49.5)	10.1 (50.2)	9.9 (49.8)
Average precipitation mm (inches)	261 (10.3)	280 (11.0)	233 (9.2)	267 (10.5)	328 (12.9)	271 (10.7)	246 (9.7)	196 (7.7)	169 (6.7)	151 (5.9)	212 (8.3)	289 (11.4)	2,903 (114.3)
Source: Climate-Data.org
