= Hitu people =

Ethnic group in Indonesia

Total population
- 19,000

Regions with significant populations
- Indonesia (Leihitu, Ambon Island)

Languages
- Hitu, Ambonese Malay, and Indonesian

Religion
- Sunni Islam

Related ethnic groups
- Ambonese and other Alifuru groups

The Hitu people are an Austronesian ethnic group originating from the Maluku province of Indonesia. The Hitu people inhabits villages along the northern coast of Ambon Island, namely Wakal, Hila, Hitulama, Hitumessing, Mamala, and Morella. Administratively, this region is located in Leihitu, Central Maluku Regency, Maluku Province.

== History ==
The early history of the formation of the Hitu people begins with a folk narrative about the Four Perdana (from Sanskrit: प्रधान, pradhāna, lit. 'chief, foremost'). The Four Perdana were the earliest groups to arrive in Leihitu, and later founded the Tanah Hitu Kingdom (id) on the northern coast of Ambon Island. The leaders are called Hitu Upu Hata in the Hitu language; the arrival of the Four Perdana also marks an important historical reference for the spread of Islam in the Maluku Islands, written by both early indigenous and European historians such as Imam Ridjali, Imam Lamhitu, Imam Kulaba, Holeman, Georg Eberhard Rumphius, and François Valentyn.

In the past, the Hitu region was a major trading center and distribution point for goods in northern Ambon Island. Hitu can be reached by both land and sea routes; however, following the Maluku sectarian conflict, public transportation typically travels to and from Ambon City only once a day. The only historical records of the Hitu people are found in their own oral stories, which describe how they once lived at the forest's edge. Later developments led them to move out of the forest and build settlements along the coast.

The Hitu people speak the Hitu language, which consists of various dialects, and use Ambonese Malay as a lingua franca when interacting with other ethnic groups.

== Religion ==
The Leihitu Peninsula was one of the early entry points of Islam in the Maluku Islands, especially the Central Maluku region, and today almost all Hitu adhere to Islam. However, like many other Muslims in Maluku, the Hitu people are also strongly influenced by older forms of animism.

== See also ==
- Tanah Hitu Kingdom (id)
