= Saumlaki =

- Town
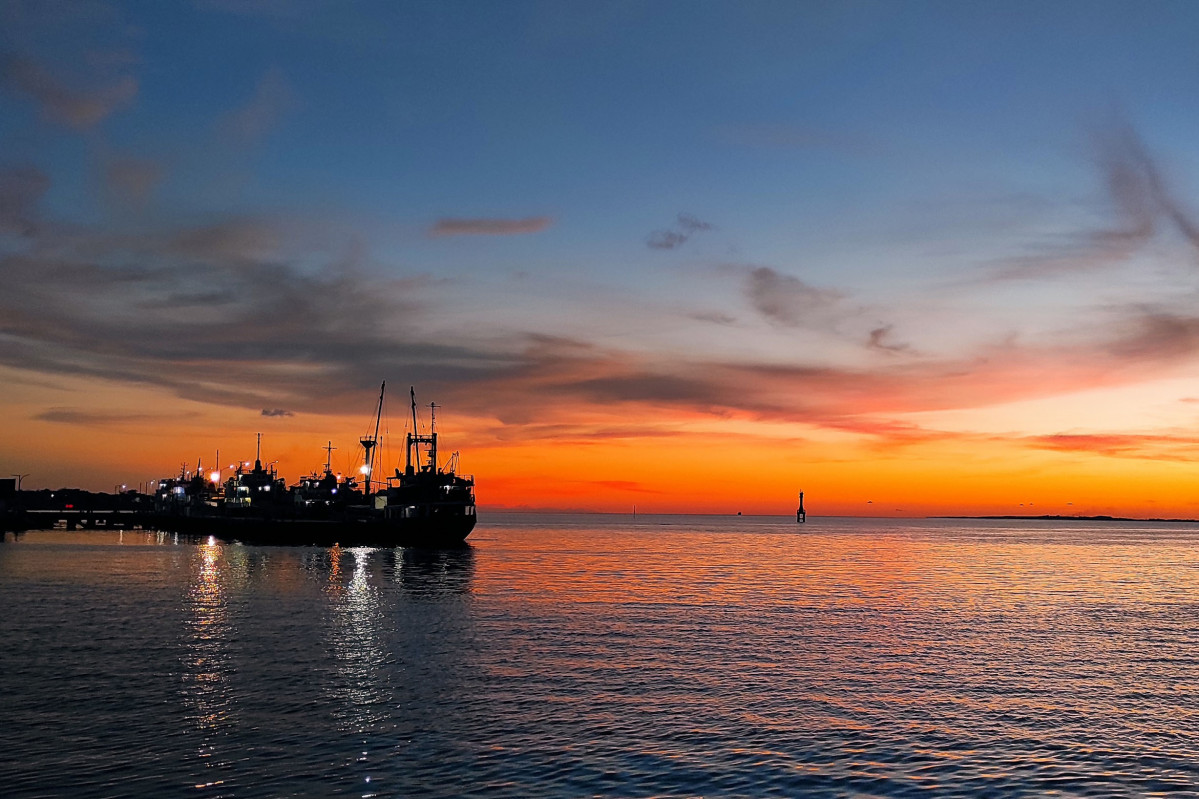
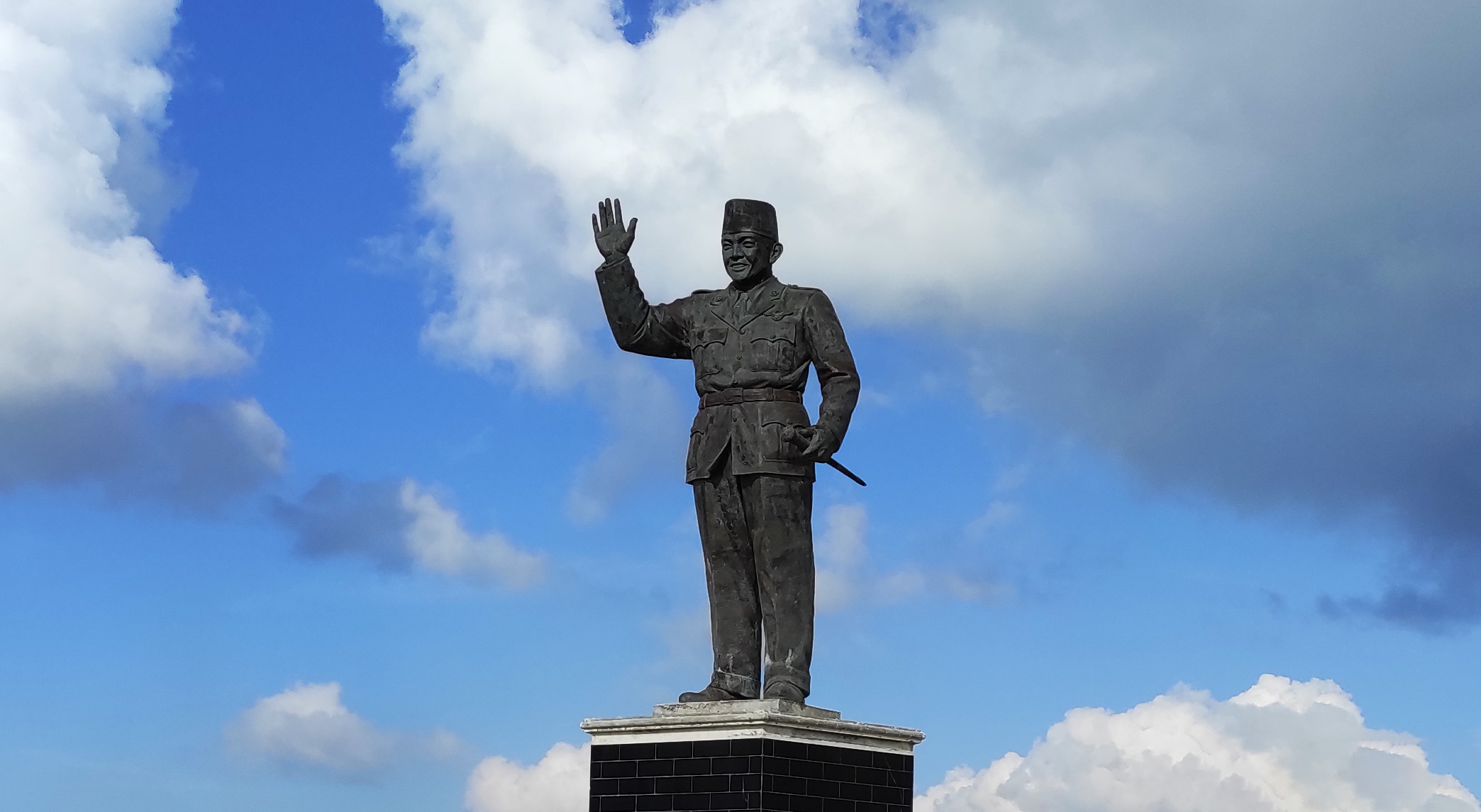
- From top: Dusk at Saumlaki Port and Sukarno Monument

- Location in Maluku Islands and Indonesia Saumlaki (Indonesia)
- Coordinates: area(24,053) 07°58′30″S 131°18′27″E
- Country: Indonesia
- Province: Maluku
- Regency: Tanimbar Islands Regency
- District: South Tanimbar

Area
  - Town proper: 12.39 km^{2} (4.78 sq mi)
  - Urban: 82.12 km^{2} (31.71 sq mi)

Population
  - Town proper: 12,916 (including Saumlaki Utara)
  - Urban: 24,053
- Time zone: UTC+9 (IEST)
- Postcode: 97464
- Area code: (+62) 918

Saumlaki is a town in Tanimbar Islands Regency, Indonesia. It is the seat of Tanimbar Islands Regency, as well as the biggest town in the island of Yamdena. Previously a small village, it has grown to a relatively sizeable town due to its political status as a regency seat. Most of the regency's infrastructure is concentrated in Saumlaki. The administrative location of the town is in the kelurahan (urban village) of Saumlaki, inside South Tanimbar District. The urban settlement extends outside of the administrative boundaries to surrounding communities such as the villages of Olilit and Sifnana.

== Geography ==
The urban area of the town of Saumlaki extends beyond its legal administrative boundary. However, the urban population is concentrated in the kelurahan of Saumlaki, which is the town proper. The town extends outside of the proper kelurahan to the neighbouring kelurahan of Saumlaki Utara (North Sumlaki) and the rural desa of Olilit and Sifnana, with which it shares a peninsula in the east of Tanimbar Selatan District. The soil formation in the town consists of limestone formed from dead corals as well as relatively young sediments.

The town has an average annual rainfall of 1,752 mm (69.0 in) with the highest amount of rainfall in January and the lowest in August. Between April and September, the wind comes from Australia, and is generally drier and causes less rainfall than usual. The average temperature of the town is between 25 and 28 °C (77.0 and 82.4 °F), with December being the hottest month.

== Economy ==
The main economic sources of the town are agriculture and fishery, including cassava, water spinach, banana, coconut, and pineapple. Livestock farming, mainly of chickens and pigs, also contributes to the economy. About 2,208 tons of fish were caught from waters around Saumlaki in 2020.

Further economic potential comes from natural gas exploration, especially Masela Bloc, located 300 km (190 mi) from the Saumlaki. The bloc is expected to be managed by Inpex's child company Inpex Masela and production is expected to begin around 2027. However, disagreements over local government ownership of the project have delayed the project. There have been some controversies surrounding the exploration, especially regarding the local government's participation interest that would be obliged to own minimum 10% of production's ownership. The regency government expected to supposedly own 5.6% from the 10% participation interest, but the provincial government in Ambon expected it to be just 3% while the rest would be divided equally to all regencies in the Maluku province. This has caused ongoing conflict between the provincial government and the regency government over the ownership of the company's 10% minimum obliged by the law.

== Infrastructure ==
=== Education ===
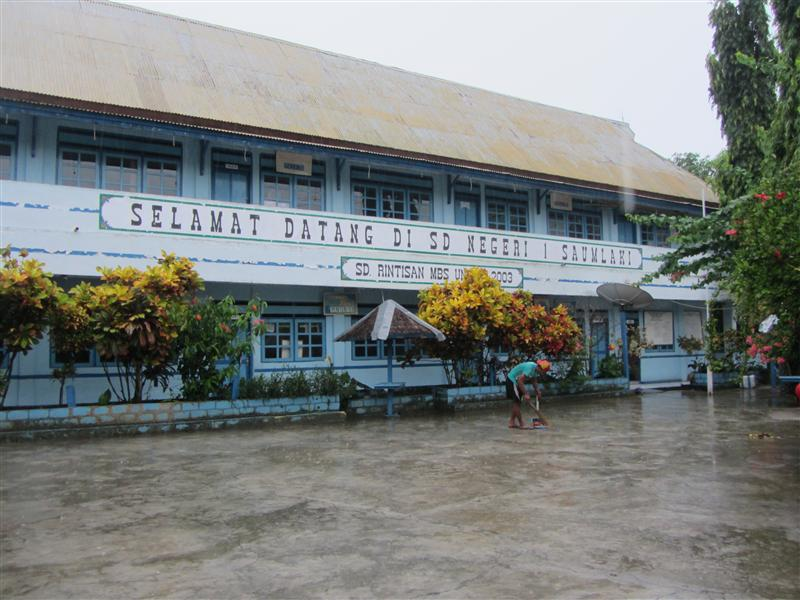
An elementary school in Saumlaki

There are five elementary schools in Saumlaki and Saumlaki kelurahan, three in Olilit, and two in Sifnana. There are two junior high schools in Saumlaki, three in Olilit desa, and one in Sifnana desa, while the numbers of senior high schools in the town are two in Saumlaki, one in Olilit, and one in Sifnana. There are also four vocational high schools: two in Saumlaki, and one each in Olilit and Sifnana.

In addition, there are three higher education institutions registered with the Ministry of Education, Culture, Research, and Technology: Saumlaki College of Economy, Saumlaki College of Administration, and Saumlaki Teaching College. All three colleges are private and owned by Rumpun Lelemuku Saumlaki Higher Learning Foundation.

There are other higher education institutions in the town, but they are not accredited or registered with the Ministry of Education and residents of the town have been urged to avoid enrolling there as they have no legal standing. The creation of illegal and unregistered colleges in the town has been described by the General Chief of Private College Coordinator, who oversees private colleges under the government, as "like mushrooms growing in the rainy season" and a serious problem to the town. Residents have criticized these colleges for spreading pamphlets around the town for recruitment and causing confusion among parents.

=== Healthcare ===
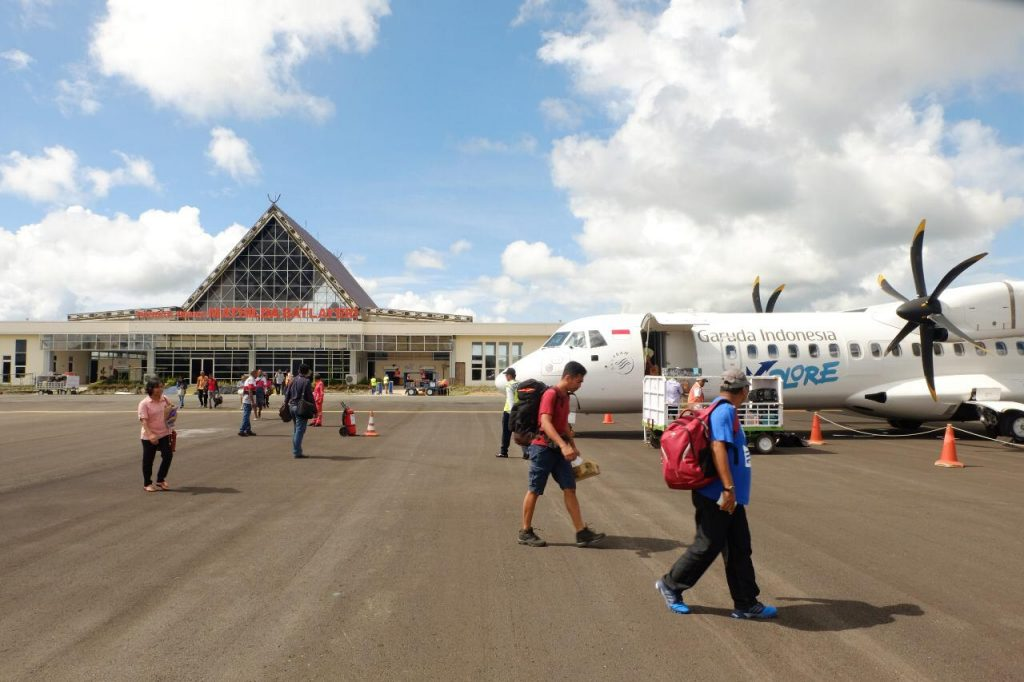
Mathilda Batlayeri Airport

There are two hospitals in the town, Fatima Hospital located in Saumlaki kelurahan and Dr. P. P. Magretti Saumlaki Regional Hospital located in Olilit desa. There are also two puskesmas, of which one has inpatient care facilities, and 9 registered pharmacies. The Dr. P. P. Magretti Saumlaki Regional Hospital is a public hospital owned by the regency government and is classified as a D-class hospital by the Ministry of Health. It is the larger of the two hospitals Fatima Hospital is privately owned and also classified as D-class.

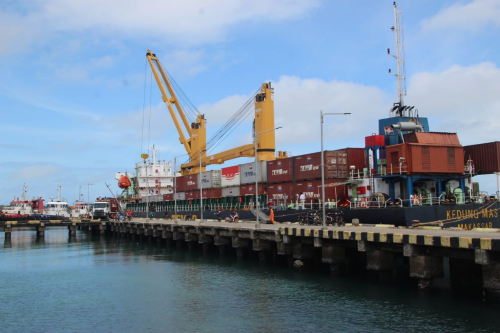
Unloading of a ship on Saumlaki Port

=== Transportation ===
Public transportation in the town consists of angkot that have regular tracks regulated by the regency government. The town is served by the small port of Saumlaki, which has regular routes to neighbouring towns such as Dobo in Aru Islands Regency. In 2021, the Indonesian Navy built a new naval base in the town which includes bigger port facilities capable of handling ships of to 12,000GT. The town was previously served by Olilit Airport, which was later replaced with the bigger Mathilda Batlayeri Airport. The airport served around 24,000 passengers in 2020, both in departures and arrivals. The town is also connected through the Sea Toll Program for passengers and movement of basic goods.

=== Others ===
The town is the only place in the district that has banks, which include four state-owned banks, two private banks, and one people's credit bank (BPR).
