= Amahai =

- Village and District
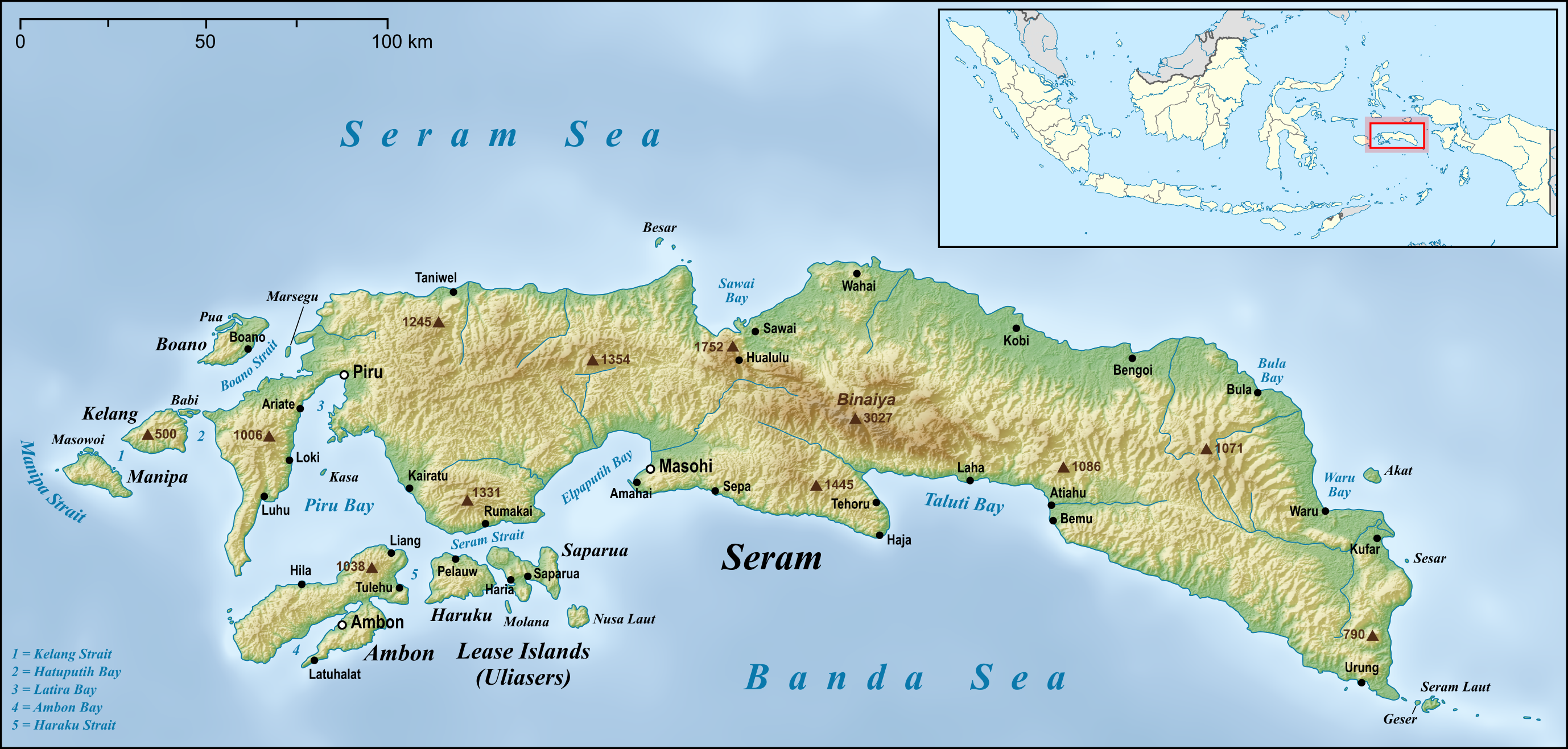
- Location in Seram Island
- Coordinates: 3°20′38″S 128°55′56″E
- Country: Indonesia
- Province: Maluku

Area
  - Total: 1,619.07 km^{2} (625.13 sq mi)

Population (mid 2023 estimate)
  - Total: 50,478
- Time zone: UTC+8 (WITA)

Amahai is a village (desa or negeri) and an administrative district (kecamatan) on the south coast of the island of Seram, in Central Maluku Regency. The village, which serves as the administrative centre of the eponymous district, lies to the south of Masohi town, both being situated on the coast of Elpaputih Bay, and they are surrounded on the landward sides by Amahai District. Teon Nila Serua District is also a semi-enclave within Amahai District, which surrounds it on all sides except the west (where it is bordered by Teluk Elpaputih District). Daily speedboats connect Tulehu (the port of Salahutu District on Ambon Island) with Amahai, which is Seram's main port.

Amahai District covers a land area of 1,619.07 km^{2} and had a population of 38,932 at the 2010 Census and 50,028 at the 2020 Census; the official estimate as at mid 2023 was 50,478 inhabitants. The district is subdivided into 14 rural villages (desa) plus the kelurahan of Hollo, all sharing the postcode of 97516.

| Kode Wilayah | Name of desa or kelurahan | Area in km^{2} | Pop'n Estimate mid 2022 |
|---|---|---|---|
| 81.01.01.2001 | Tamilouw | 596.00 | 7,917 |
| 81.01.16.2002 | Sepa | 223.60 | 8,544 |
| 81.01.16.2003 | Rutah | 40.00 | 3,436 |
| 81.01.16.2004 | Soahuku | 27.00 | 4,791 |
| 81.01.16.2005 | Amahai (village) | 52.00 | 3,664 |
| 81.01.16.2006 | Haruru | 20.70 | 9,456 |
| 81.01.16.2007 | Sehati | 1.87 | 814 |
| 81.01.01.2008 | Makariki | 39.00 | 4,128 |
| 81.01.16.1009 | Hollo | 10.70 | 1,745 |
| 81.01.16.2010 | Yafila | 4.00 | 611 |
| 81.01.16.2011 | Banda Baru | 8.50 | 501 |
| 81.01.16.2020 | Yanuielo | 0.30 | 2,788 |
| 81.01.16.2021 | Nuanea | 125.00 | 461 |
| 81.01.16.2022 | Hatuhenu | 0.30 | 385 |
| 81.01.16.2023 | Nuweletetu | 0.10 | 300 |

Climate data for Amahai, Seram Maluku Indonesia
| Month | Jan | Feb | Mar | Apr | May | Jun | Jul | Aug | Sep | Oct | Nov | Dec | Year |
|---|---|---|---|---|---|---|---|---|---|---|---|---|---|
| Record high °C (°F) | 35 (95) | 35 (95) | 35 (95) | 33 (91) | 32 (90) | 30 (86) | 30 (86) | 30 (86) | 31 (88) | 32 (90) | 34 (93) | 35 (95) | 35 (95) |
| Mean daily maximum °C (°F) | 31 (88) | 31 (88) | 31 (88) | 30 (86) | 28 (82) | 27 (81) | 27 (81) | 27 (81) | 28 (82) | 29 (84) | 31 (88) | 31 (88) | 29 (84) |
| Daily mean °C (°F) | 27 (81) | 27 (81) | 27 (81) | 27 (81) | 25 (77) | 25 (77) | 25 (77) | 25 (77) | 25 (77) | 26 (79) | 27 (81) | 27 (81) | 26 (79) |
| Mean daily minimum °C (°F) | 24 (75) | 24 (75) | 24 (75) | 24 (75) | 23 (73) | 23 (73) | 23 (73) | 23 (73) | 23 (73) | 23 (73) | 23 (73) | 24 (75) | 23 (73) |
| Record low °C (°F) | 22 (72) | 22 (72) | 22 (72) | 21 (70) | 21 (70) | 20 (68) | 20 (68) | 19 (66) | 18 (64) | 18 (64) | 21 (70) | 20 (68) | 18 (64) |
| Average precipitation mm (inches) | 120 (4.7) | 110 (4.3) | 130 (5.1) | 270 (10.6) | 510 (20.1) | 630 (24.8) | 600 (23.6) | 400 (15.7) | 240 (9.4) | 150 (5.9) | 110 (4.3) | 130 (5.1) | 3,450 (135.8) |
| Average rainy days | 6 | 6 | 5 | 6 | — | 23 | 22 | 18 | 12 | 9 | 7 | 7 | 121 |
| Average relative humidity (%) (daily average) | 78 | 77 | 79 | 82 | 83 | 84 | 83 | 82 | 81 | 80 | 79 | 78 | 81 |
| Mean daily sunshine hours | 12.7 | 12.6 | 12.5 | 12.4 | 12.3 | 12.3 | 12.3 | 12.4 | 12.4 | 12.5 | 12.6 | 12.7 | 12.5 |
