= Ambon Bay =

Bay in Indonesia

- Teluk Ambon (Indonesian)
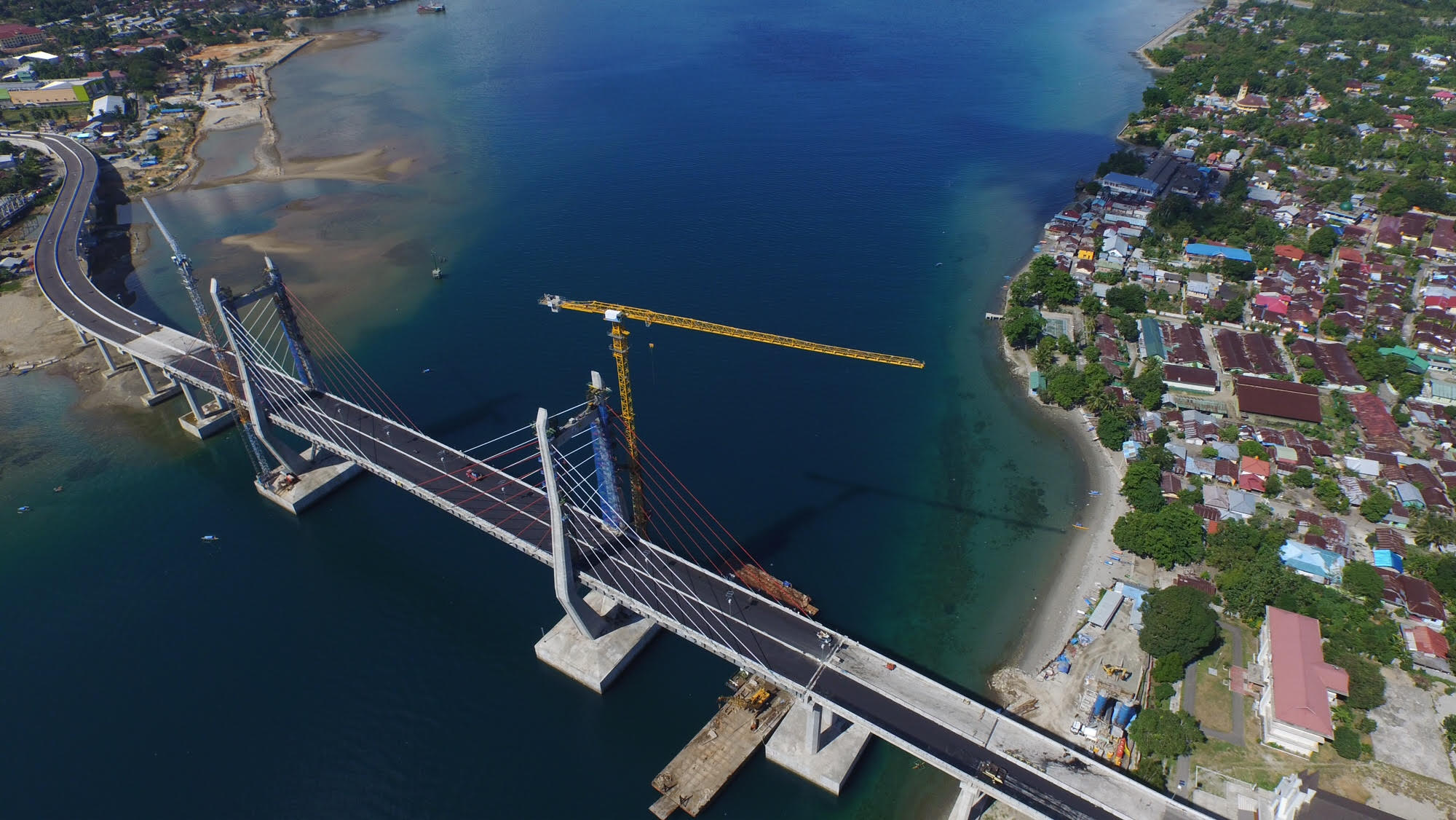
- Merah Putih Bridge spanning over Ambon Bay

- Location within Maluku
- Location: Southeast Asia
- Coordinates: 3.69°S 128.15°E
- Type: Bay
- Basin countries: Indonesia
- References: Ambon

Ambon Bay (Indonesian: Teluk Ambon) is a bay that located in Ambon island, Maluku province, Indonesia. The bay separates Ambon island into two peninsulas; the southeastern and smaller peninsula is called Leitimur, while the larger northern peninsula is called Leihitu or Hitoe. These peninsulas are connected by a narrow neck of land on the eastern part of the island. The bay opens to the Banda Sea in the southwest direction. The Ambon Bay thus formed cuts about 20 kilometres into the island with the airport on the northern shore and the city of Ambon on the southern side. The city of Ambon covers the entirety of Leitimur, with its centre on the northwest coast of Leitimur, facing Leihitu, and has a safe harbor on Amboina Bay.

The Merah Putih Bridge completed in 2016, spanned over the bay connecting the two peninsulas, cutting the travel time between the airport on the north shore and Ambon city on the south shore.

The Ambon bay festival is held every year in September.
