= Ambon bay festival =

Ambon Bay Festival (Indonesian: Festival Teluk Ambon) is an annual event held at Ambon Bay and across West Seram Regency, Maluku, Indonesia at the end of September. The festival aims to promote national and international tourism to the Maluku Islands. It has been held since 2006.
