= Regent of Buru =

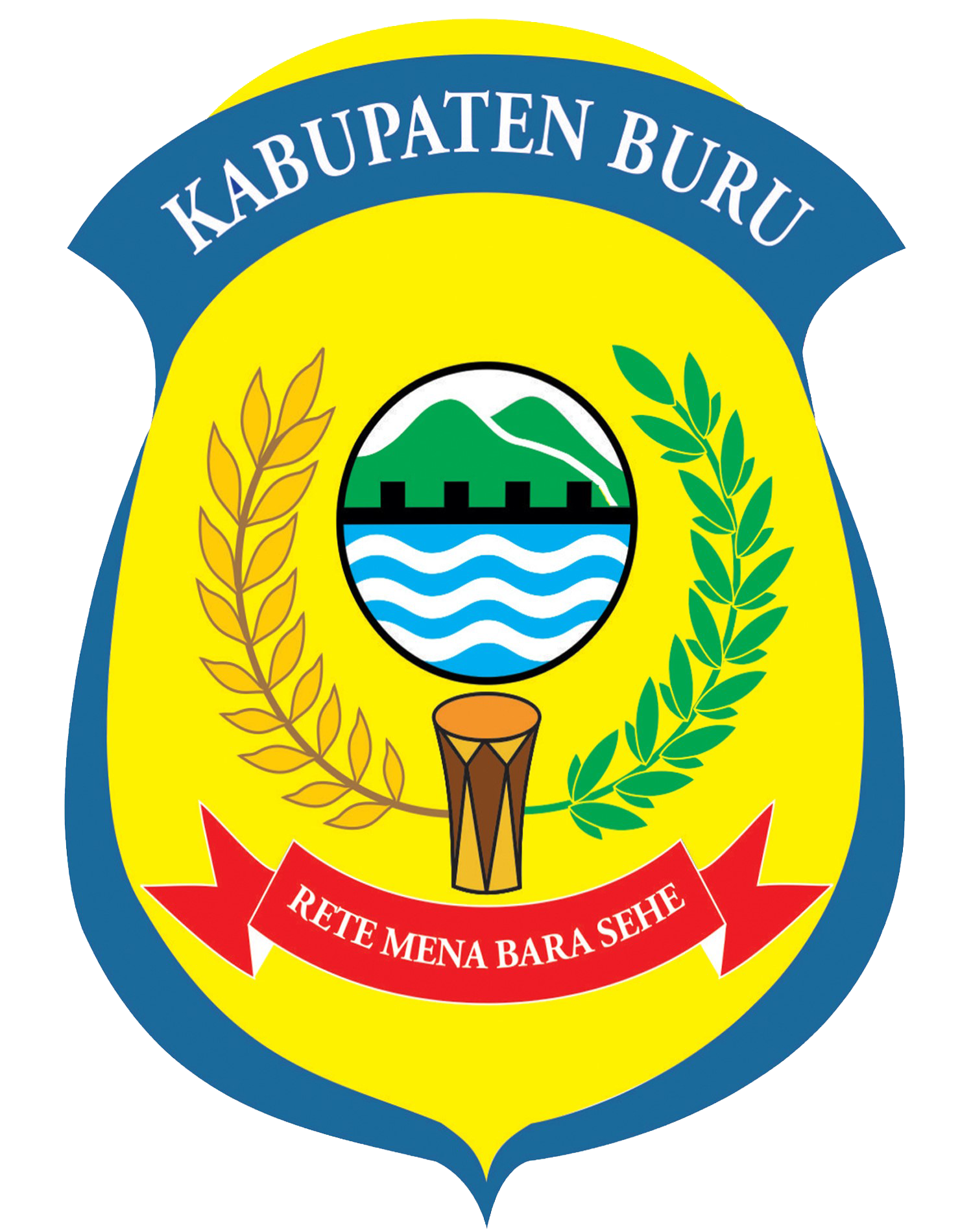

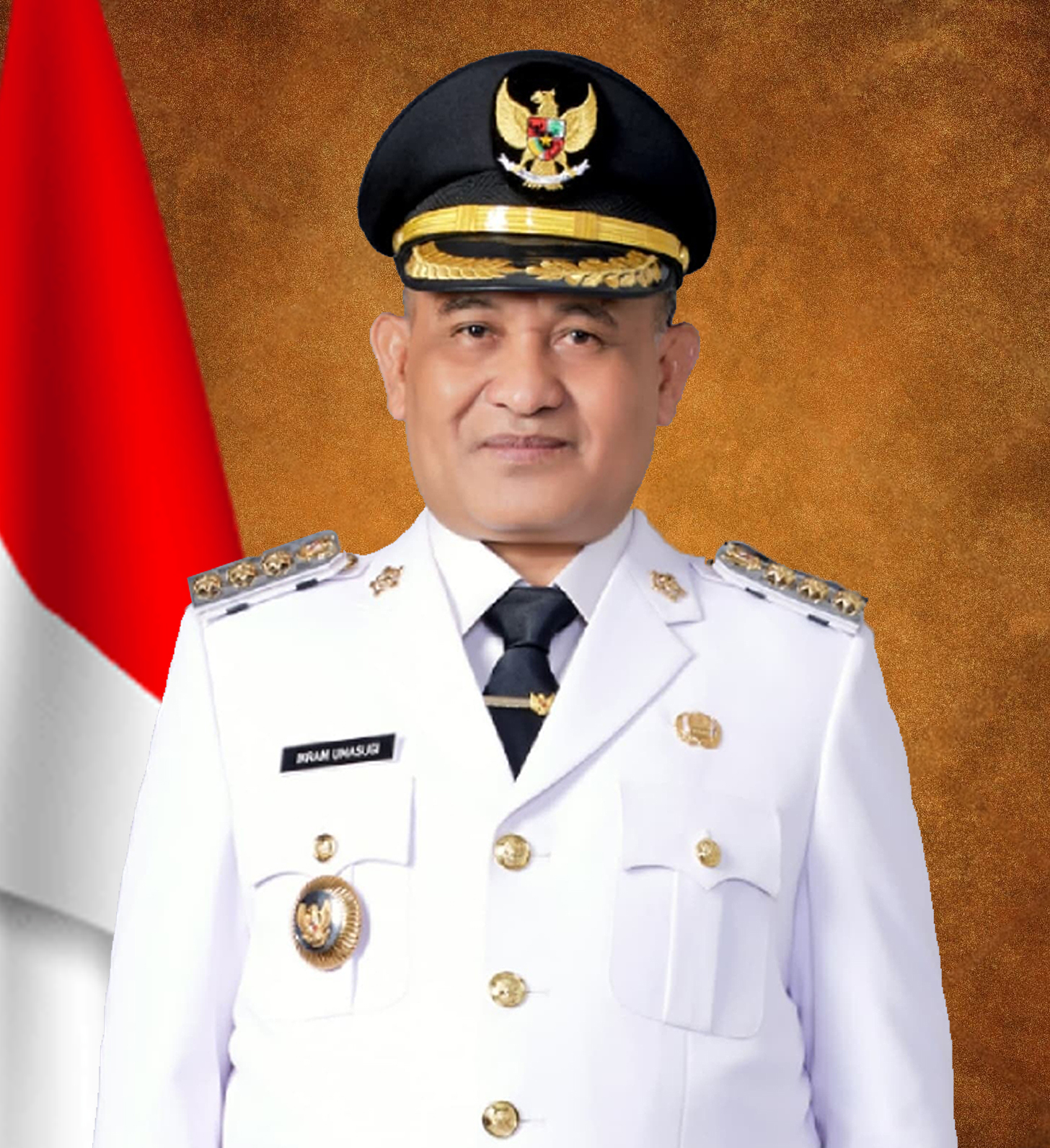
- Incumbent; Ikram Umasugi since 26 May 2025
- Appointer: Governor of Maluku

The following is a definitive list of Regents of Buru since 1999 after the division of Buru Regency from Central Maluku Regency, Indonesia.

== List of Regents of Buru ==
| No. | Regent | Potrait | Party | Took office | Left | Period | Total time | General election | Vice regent | Ref. |
|---|---|---|---|---|---|---|---|---|---|---|
| 1 | Husnie Hentihu (1950–2023) | | Nonpartisan | 2002 | 2007 | 2002–2007 | 4–5 years | 1 (2002) | Bakri Lumbessy | |
| 1 | Husnie Hentihu (1950–2023) | | Nonpartisan | 2 February 2007 | 2 February 2012 | 2007–2012 | 5 years, 0 days | 2 (2007) | Ramly Ibrahim Umasugi | |
| 2 | Ramly Ibrahim Umasugi (1970–) | | Golkar | 2 February 2012 | 28 October 2016 | 2012–2017 | 4 years, 269 days | 3 (2012) | Juhana Soedrajat | |
| 2 | Ramly Ibrahim Umasugi (1970–) | | Golkar | 22 May 2017 | 22 May 2022 | 2017–2022 | 5 years, 0 days | 4 (2017) | Amustofa Besan | |
| 3 | Ikram Umasugi (1972–) | | PKB | 26 Mei 2025 | Incumbent | 2025–2030 | 1 year, 104 days | 5 (2024) | Sudarmo | |
