= Yaputih =

- Location in Maluku and Indonesia Yaputih (Indonesia)
- Coordinates: 3°11′30.0264″S 129°29′56.0292″E
- Country: Indonesia
- Province: Maluku
- Regency: Central Maluku Regency
- District: Tehoru District
- Elevation: 8,163 ft (2,488 m)

Population (2010)
  - Total: 1,524
- Time zone: UTC+9 (Indonesia Eastern Standard Time)

Yaputih is a village in Tehoru district, Central Maluku Regency in Maluku Province, Indonesia. Its population was 1,524 at the 2010 Census.It is within the Eastern Indonesian Time Zone (UTC+9).

== Climate ==
Yaputih has a cool subtropical highland climate (Cfb) with heavy rainfall year-round.

Climate data for Yaputih
| Month | Jan | Feb | Mar | Apr | May | Jun | Jul | Aug | Sep | Oct | Nov | Dec | Year |
|---|---|---|---|---|---|---|---|---|---|---|---|---|---|
| Mean daily maximum °C (°F) | 19.1 (66.4) | 19.1 (66.4) | 18.7 (65.7) | 17.8 (64.0) | 16.5 (61.7) | 15.3 (59.5) | 14.3 (57.7) | 14.5 (58.1) | 16.1 (61.0) | 18.1 (64.6) | 19.1 (66.4) | 19.1 (66.4) | 17.3 (63.2) |
| Daily mean °C (°F) | 15.0 (59.0) | 15.0 (59.0) | 14.9 (58.8) | 14.4 (57.9) | 13.7 (56.7) | 13.0 (55.4) | 12.4 (54.3) | 12.3 (54.1) | 13.0 (55.4) | 14.1 (57.4) | 14.7 (58.5) | 14.9 (58.8) | 14.0 (57.1) |
| Mean daily minimum °C (°F) | 10.9 (51.6) | 10.9 (51.6) | 11.1 (52.0) | 11.0 (51.8) | 11.0 (51.8) | 10.8 (51.4) | 10.5 (50.9) | 10.1 (50.2) | 10.0 (50.0) | 10.2 (50.4) | 10.4 (50.7) | 10.8 (51.4) | 10.6 (51.2) |
| Average precipitation mm (inches) | 257 (10.1) | 275 (10.8) | 229 (9.0) | 264 (10.4) | 327 (12.9) | 271 (10.7) | 244 (9.6) | 195 (7.7) | 168 (6.6) | 148 (5.8) | 207 (8.1) | 284 (11.2) | 2,869 (112.9) |
Source: Climate-Data.org
