= Ikram Umasugi =

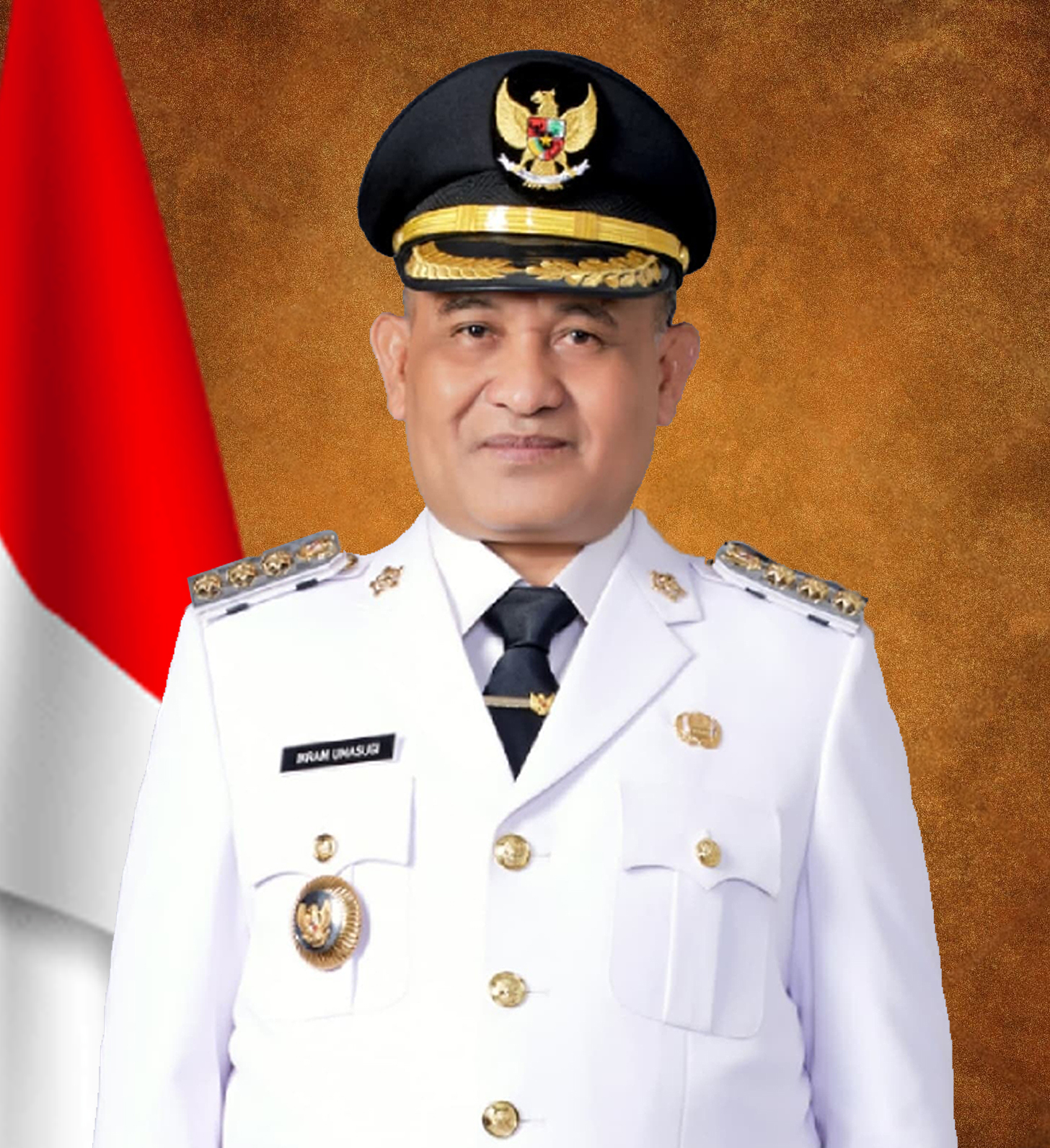

3rd Regent of Buru
- Incumbent
- Assumed office 26 May 2025
- President: Prabowo Subianto
- Preceded by: Ramly Ibrahim Umasugi

Personal details
- Born: December 5, 1972 (age 53) Sawa, Maluku
- Party: PKB
- Spouse: Mohra Hukul
- Education: Sekolah Tinggi Ilmu Ekonomi Artha Bodhi Iswara

Ikram Umasugi (born December 5, 1972) is an Indonesian politician from the National Awakening Party (PKB) who served as Regent of Buru for the 2025–2030 term. He took office on May 26, 2025, after being inaugurated by Maluku Governor Hendrik Lewerissa at the Maluku Governor's Office in Ambon City. Previously, he served as a member of the Maluku's Regional House of Representatives (DPRD) for the 2019–2024 term.

In the 2024 Buru Regent Election, he ran for Regent of Buru for the 2025–2030 term, paired with Prosperous Justice Party politician Sudarmo. The pair emerged victorious, securing 22,408 votes, or 28.65% of the total valid votes.
