= Masohi =

- Town
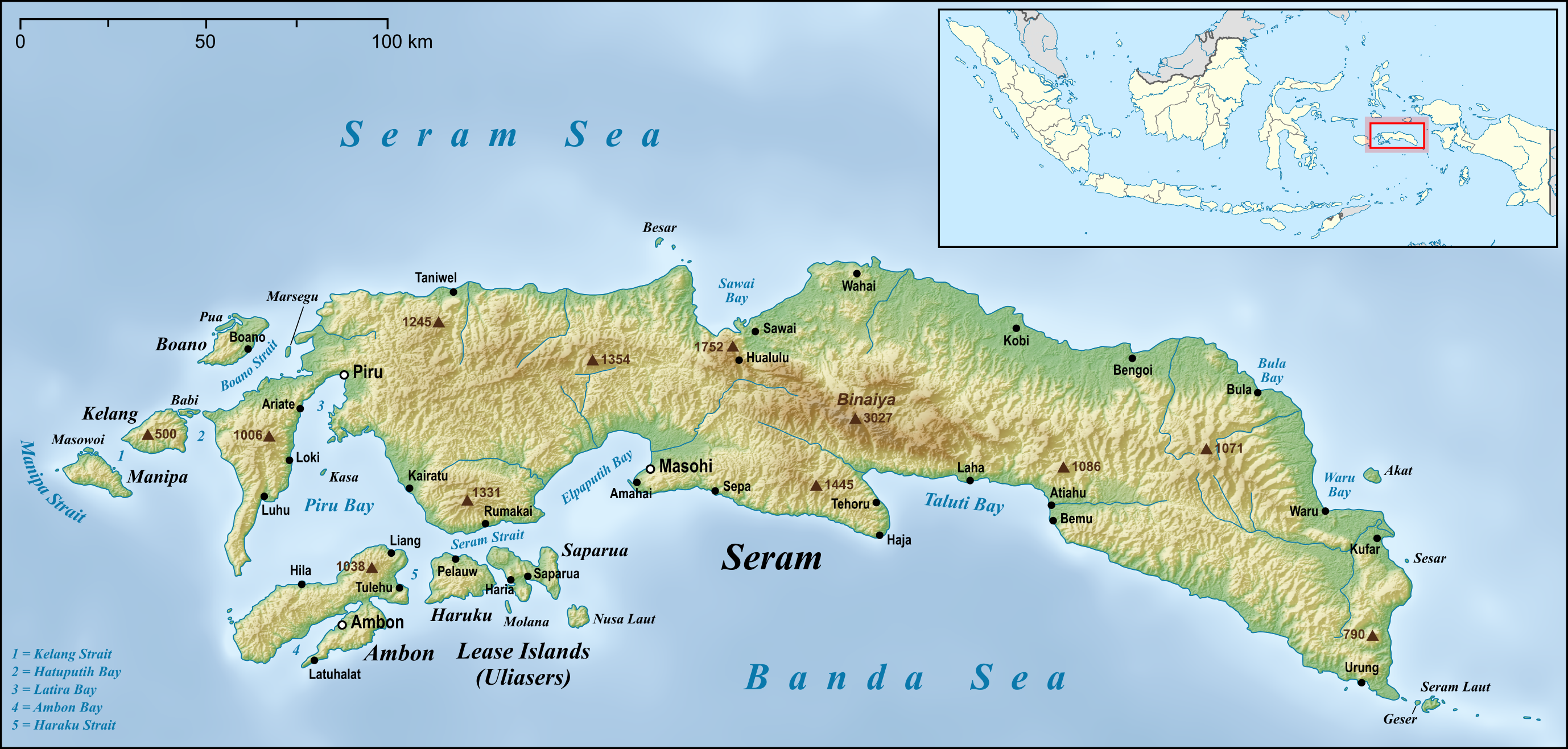
- Location in Seram Island
- Coordinates: 3°17′56″S 128°57′58″E
- Country: Indonesia
- Province: Maluku
- Regency: Central Maluku

Area
  - Total: 37.30 km^{2} (14.40 sq mi)

Population (2020 Census)
  - Total: 36,433
- Time zone: UTC+9 (WIT)

Masohi is a coastal town on the Indonesian island of Seram. It is the capital of the Central Maluku Regency (Kabupaten Maluku Tengah). It was the site of a detention camp for political prisoners in the 1970s. It had 36,433 inhabitants at the 2020 census. The headquarters of Manusela National Park is located in Masohi.

== History ==
The name Masohi comes from a bahasa tanah from the Central Maluku branch which means 'mutual cooperation'. After being devastated and losing many of its residents due to sectarian riots at the beginning of the 21st century, this town is starting to improve itself again. The original residents are Alifuru peoples who have absorbed Ambonese culture and speak Ambonese Malay, but many immigrants from the Indonesian government's transimgration program live in this town. Masohi is a city that was built on 3 November 1957 and was inaugurated by 'laying the first stone' by Indonesia's first president, Sukarno. This town was originally built on disputed land between the Amahai regional government and the Maluku provincial government after the West Seram area was not deemed suitable. This city was founded on the traditional land of the Amahai village, which was previously known as Dataran Nama (Nama Plains) which was the beginning of the new history of Seram (Nusa Ina) after its weakening the power of Republic of South Maluku leadership of Chris Soumokil as well as a form of developing Maluku after the independence of the Republic of Indonesia.

== Administrative division ==
The town comprises the five urban villages or kelurahan (with their 2020 census populations) of Ampera (6,385), Lesane (4,493), Letwaru (6,412), Namaelo (15,280), and Namasina (3,863).

== Sectarian Conflict ==
The sectarian conflict in Masohi, which is the capital of Central Maluku Regency on Seram Island, is part of a series of violence that has hit Maluku between Muslim and Christian communities since the late 1990s. Masohi, like other areas in Maluku, has not escaped the impact of sectarian conflict.

At its peak around 1999-2000, Masohi experienced violence triggered by tensions between religious groups. As in other areas, small provocations often triggered major clashes amidst the tense atmosphere. Houses of worship were burned, property was destroyed, and many people fled to areas considered safer by the community.

The violence in Masohi involved religious divisions, with Muslim and Christian communities living in separate areas. The already-built mistrust and resentment exacerbated the situation, and clashes occasionally occurred despite the signing of the Malino peace agreement in 2002. However, after 2002, Masohi, like many other areas in Maluku, began to see improvement, although sporadic incidents of sectarian violence continued to occur for several years to come.

Recovery in Masohi will take time, with reconciliation efforts undertaken by community, religious and government leaders to heal the deep wounds caused by the conflict.

== Transportation ==
The road connecting Masohi runs east and west along the coast from Masohi. There is another road but it goes through the mountains to Wahai on the north coast. There is also a domestic airport here, connecting Masohi with Ambon and Banda Islands. Then there is also a sea port that serves ships coming from Ambon, Saparua, and other areas in Maluku.
