= Hitu language =

Austronesian language spoken in Maluku, Indonesia

Hitu
- Native to: Indonesia
- Region: Ambon Island, Maluku
- Ethnicity: Hitu people
- Native speakers: (16,000 cited 1987)
- Language family: Austronesian: Malayo-Polynesian; Central–Eastern; Central Maluku ?; East Central Maluku; Seram ?; Nunusaku; Piru Bay; East; Seram Straits; Ambon; Hitu

Language codes
- ISO 639-3: htu
- Glottolog: hitu1239

Hitu is an Austronesian language of the Central Malayo-Polynesian subgroup spoken on Ambon Island in eastern Indonesia, part of a dialect chain of Seram Island, by the Hitu people.

Hitu is the name of a village; each of the villages, Wakal, Morela, Mamala, Hitu, and Hila, are said to have their own dialect.
