= Tehoru =

- Kecamatan and village
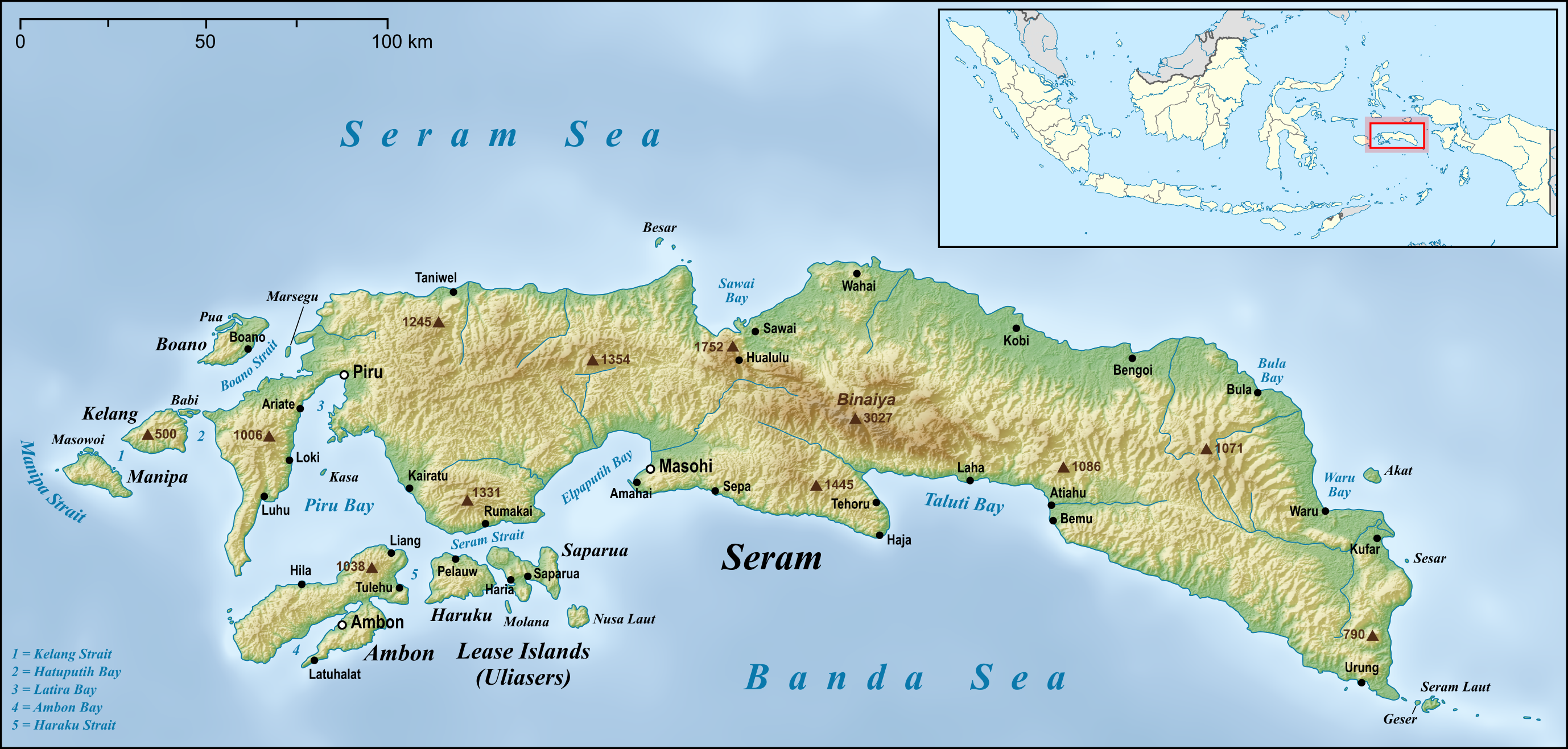
- Location in Seram Island
- Coordinates: 3°25′11″S 129°33′55″E
- Country: Indonesia
- Province: Maluku
- Regency: Central Maluku
- Time zone: UTC+8 (WITA)

Tehoru is a village on the south coast of the Indonesian island of Seram. The office of the camat of the Kecamatan of Tehoru (a subdivision of the Central Maluku Regency) is located here. Tehoru is at the south end of Teluti Bay on the Banda Sea.
