= Namrole =

- Town
- Location in the Maluku Islands of Indonesia
- Coordinates: 3°51′S 126°44′E
- Country: Indonesia
- Province: Maluku
- Regency: South Buru

Area
  - Total: 326 km^{2} (126 sq mi)

Population (mid 2022 estimate)
  - Total: 21,513
  - Density: 66.0/km^{2} (171/sq mi)
- Time zone: UTC+9 (WIB)

Namrole is a district (kecamatan) on the southern coast of Buru Island, Indonesia. It is the seat of South Buru Regency.

The district is mostly rural and subdivided into 17 villages, having a population of just over 21,500 people as of mid 2022. The district town itself is located at the southern coast of the district, on the east side of a small bay. The district is served by the Namrole Airport, on the west side of the same bay.
