= Tanimbar Islands Regency =

Regency in Maluku, Indonesia

Tanimbar Islands Regency Kabupaten Kepulauan Tanimbar
- Regency
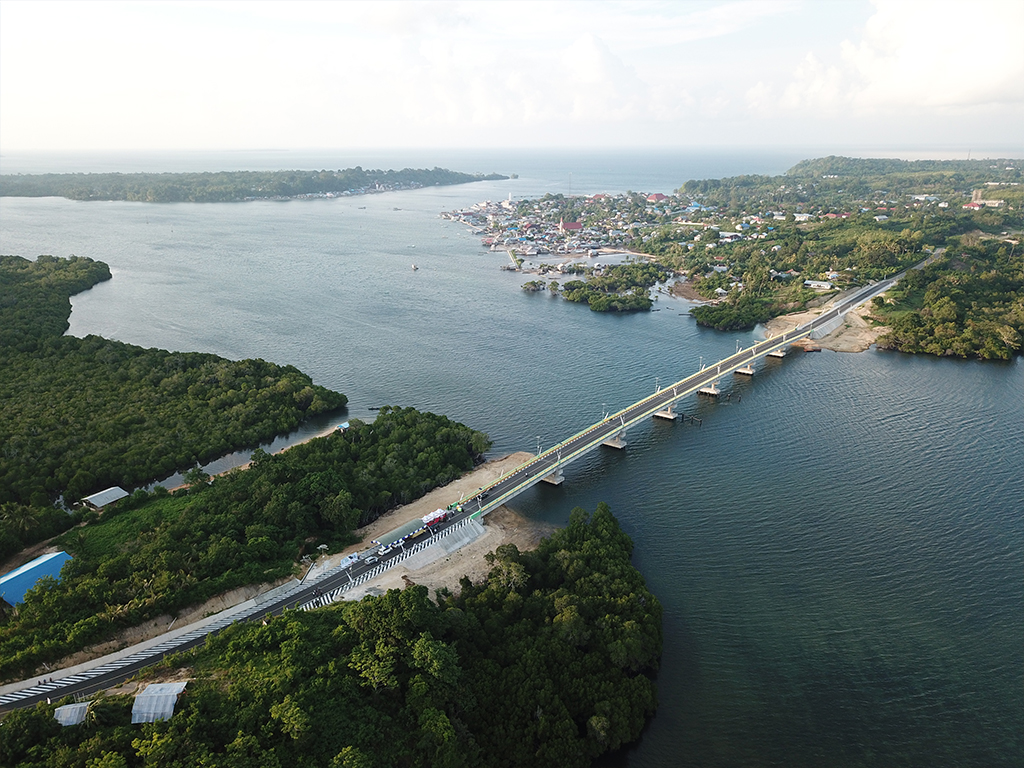
- Leta Oar Ralan bridge

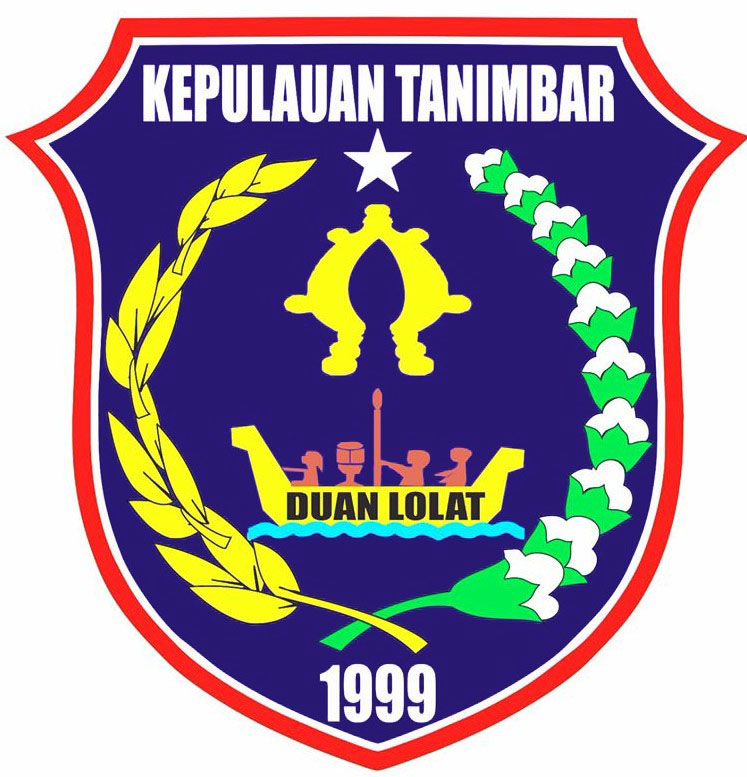
- Coat of arms
- Motto: Duan Lolat
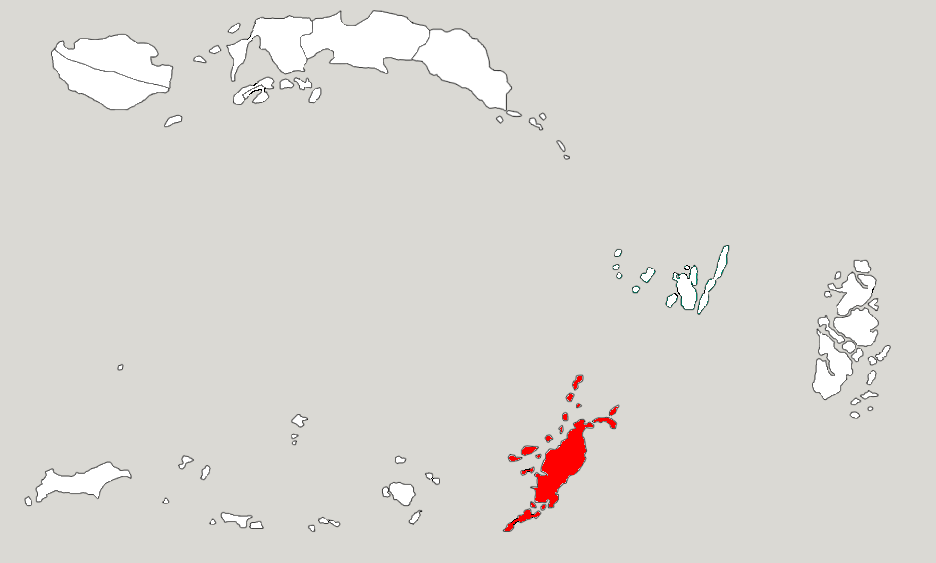
- Location within Maluku

- Location in Maluku and Indonesia Tanimbar Islands Regency (Indonesia)
- Coordinates: 7.9742°S 131.3049°E
- Country: Indonesia
- Province: Maluku
- Capital: Saumlaki

Government
  - Regent: Ricky Jauwerissa
  - Vice Regent: Juliana Chatarina Ratuanak

Area
  - Total: 10,166.82 km^{2} (3,925.43 sq mi)

Population (mid 2024 estimate)
  - Total: 132,337
  - Density: 13.0166/km^{2} (33.7127/sq mi)
- Time zone: UTC+9 (IEST)
- Area code: (+62) 918
- Website: mtbkab.go.id

Tanimbar Islands Regency (Indonesian: Kabupaten Kepulauan Tanimbar) is a regency of Maluku province, Indonesia, consisting primarily of the Tanimbar Islands. The Regency covers a land area of 10,166.82 km^{2}, and it had a population of 105,341 at the 2010 Census and 123,572 at the 2020 Census; the official estimate as at mid 2024 was 132,337 (comprising 66,317 males and 66,020 females). The principal town and administrative centre lies at Saumlaki in Tanimbar Selatan District.

== History ==
The regency was originally created from the western districts of Southeast Maluku Regency on 4 October 1999 as the "West Southeast Maluku Regency" (Kabupaten Maluku Tenggara Barat). On 24 June 2008 the western districts of this Regency were split off to create the Southwest Maluku Regency (Kabupaten Maluku Barat Daya), leaving only the archipelago of the Tanimbar Islands in the West Southeast Maluku Regency, which was later renamed as Tanimbar Islands Regency (Kabupaten Kepulauan Tanimbar) on 23 January 2019; the legislation for this was passed on 28 January 2019.

== Administration ==
As at 2010 the regency was divided into nine districts (kecamatan). Subsequently, a tenth district - Molu Maru (consisting of the two northernmost islands in the Tanimbars - Molu and Maru - with a combined land area of 63.8 km^{2}) - was by 2017 created from part of the existing Wuorlabobar District. The districts are tabulated below with their areas in km^{2} and their populations at the 2010 Census and the 2020 Census, together with the official estimates as at mid 2024. The table also includes the locations of the district administrative centres, the number of administrative villages in each district (totaling 80 rural desa and 2 urban kelurahan), and its postal code. Altogether the archipelago contains 99 islands, of which the principal island is Yamdena.

Kode Wilayah	Name of District (kecamatan)	Area in km^{2}	Pop'on Census 2010	Pop'n Census 2020	Pop'n Estimate mid 2024	Admin centre	No. of villages	Post code
81.03.01	Tanimbar Selatan (South Tanimbar)	825.69	31,571	39,085	39,574	Saumlaki	12 ^{(a)}	97471
81.03.03	Wertambrian	1,298.45	9,708	11,629	12,348	Lorulun	9	97473
81.03.04	Wermaktian	2,941.16	10,905	12,937	14,348	Kamatubun	9	97472
81.03.02	Selaru (Selaru Island)	826.26	12,249	14,263	15,662	Adaut	7	97481
81.03.05	Tanimbar Utara (North Tanimbar)	1,075.74	13,226	13,860	15,047	Ritabel	8	97464
81.03.06	Fordata ^{(b)} (Fordata Island)	79.42	4,810	4,770	5,199	Romean	6	97466
81.03.07	Wuar Labobar	654.74	9,907	8,348	9,327	Wunlah	11	97465
81.03.18	Molu Maru	63.10	^{(c)}	3,692	4,132	Adoda Molo	5	97462
81.03.09	Nirunmas	1,468.30	7,044	7,991	7,953	Tutukembong	50	97463
81.03.08	Kormomolin	933.16	5,921	6,997	8,747	Alusi Kelaan	10	97461
	Totals	10,166.82	105,341	123,572	132,337	Saumlaki	82	

Notes: (a) including 2 kelurahan - the towns of Saumlaki (with 7,795 inhabitants as at mid 2023) and Saumlaki Utara (North Saumlaki, with 5,121 inhabitants as at 2023), while the most populated desa are Olilit (with 6,969 inhabitants in 2023) and Sifnana (4,168) with which Saumlaki and North Saumlaki share a peninsula in the southeast of Yamdena Island.
(b) Yaru District changed its name to Fordata District in 2019.
(c) the 2010 population of Molu Maru District is included in the figure for Wuar Labobar District, from which it was split off.
