= Leihitu =

Leihitu, alternately called the Hitu Land (Indonesian: Tanah Hitu) or the Leihitu Peninsula (Indonesian: Jazirah Leihitu or Semenanjung Leihitu), is the major portion of Ambon Island in the Maluku Province of Indonesia. It includes the larger share of the land area of the island, only excluding the Leitimur Peninsula which projects from the southeast corner of Leihitu, the two being separated — apart from a narrow isthmus linking them — by the extensive Ambon Bay on the west side of the isthmus and the much smaller Baguala Bay on the east side.

== Administrative division ==
The southern side of Leihitu forms part of the area of Ambon City, and faces the central part of that city across Ambon Bay. The greater part of Leihitu (after excluding the part within the city) forms three of the administrative districts (kelurahan) of Central Maluku Regency — Leihitu District in the north of the island, West Leithitu District (Leithitu Barat) in the southwest and Salahutu District in the northeast.

The three districts cover a land area of 383.92 km^{2} and had a combined population of 110,359 at the 2010 Census and 128,069 at the 2020 Census; the official estimate as at mid 2023 was 128,754.

Kode Wilayah	Name of District (kecamatan)	Admin Centre	Area in km^{2}	Pop'n Census 2010	Pop'n Census 2020	Pop'n Estimate mid 2023	No. of villages	Post code
81.01.15	Leihitu ^{(a)}	Hila	147.63	46,978	53,728	54,864	11	97580
81.01.22	Leihitu Barat	Larike	84.47	16,678	19,543	19,724	5	97581
81.01.14	Salahutu	Tulehu	151.82	46,703	54,798	54,166	6	97582
	(Totals)		383.92	110,359	128,069	128,754	22	

The 22 rural villages (desa) are listed below with their areas and their populations as at the 2020 Census.

Kode Wilayah	Name of desa	Area in km^{2}	Pop'n Census 2020
81.01.15.2006	Asilulu	19.0	5,434
81.01.15.2007	Ureng	16.0	3,760
81.01.15.2008	Negeri Lima	19.0	4,496
81.01.15.2009	Seith	19.0	5,606
81.01.15.2010	Kaitetu	14.0	4,618
81.01.15.2011	Hila	20.0	7,786
81.01.15.2012	Wakal	15.0	3,566
81.01.15.2013	Hitulama	17.0	5,128
81.01.15.2014	Hitumessing	20.0	7,077
81.01.15.2015	Mamala	14.4	2,652
81.01.15.2016	Morella	13.5	3,605
81.01.15 Totals	Leihitu District	189.00	53,728
81.01.22.2001	Larike	18.56	4,535
81.01.22.2002	Wakasihu	13.93	2,991
81.01.22.2003	Allang	20.42	5,226
81.01.22.2004	Lilibooi	14.85	2,345
81.01.22.2005	Hatu	16.71	4,446
81.01.22 Totals	Leihitu Barat District	84.47	19,543
81.01.14.2001	Liang	30.22	8,096
81.01.14.2002	Waai	31.73	8,159
81.01.14.2003	Tulehu	20.24	20,673
81.01.14.2004	Tial	15.76	3,321
81.01.14.2005	Tenga-Tenga	11.17	2,662
81.01.14.2006	Suli	42.70	11,887
81.01.14 Totals	Salahutu District	172.00	54,798
