= South Buru Regency =

Regency in Maluku, Indonesia

South Buru Regency Kabupaten Buru Selatan
- Regency
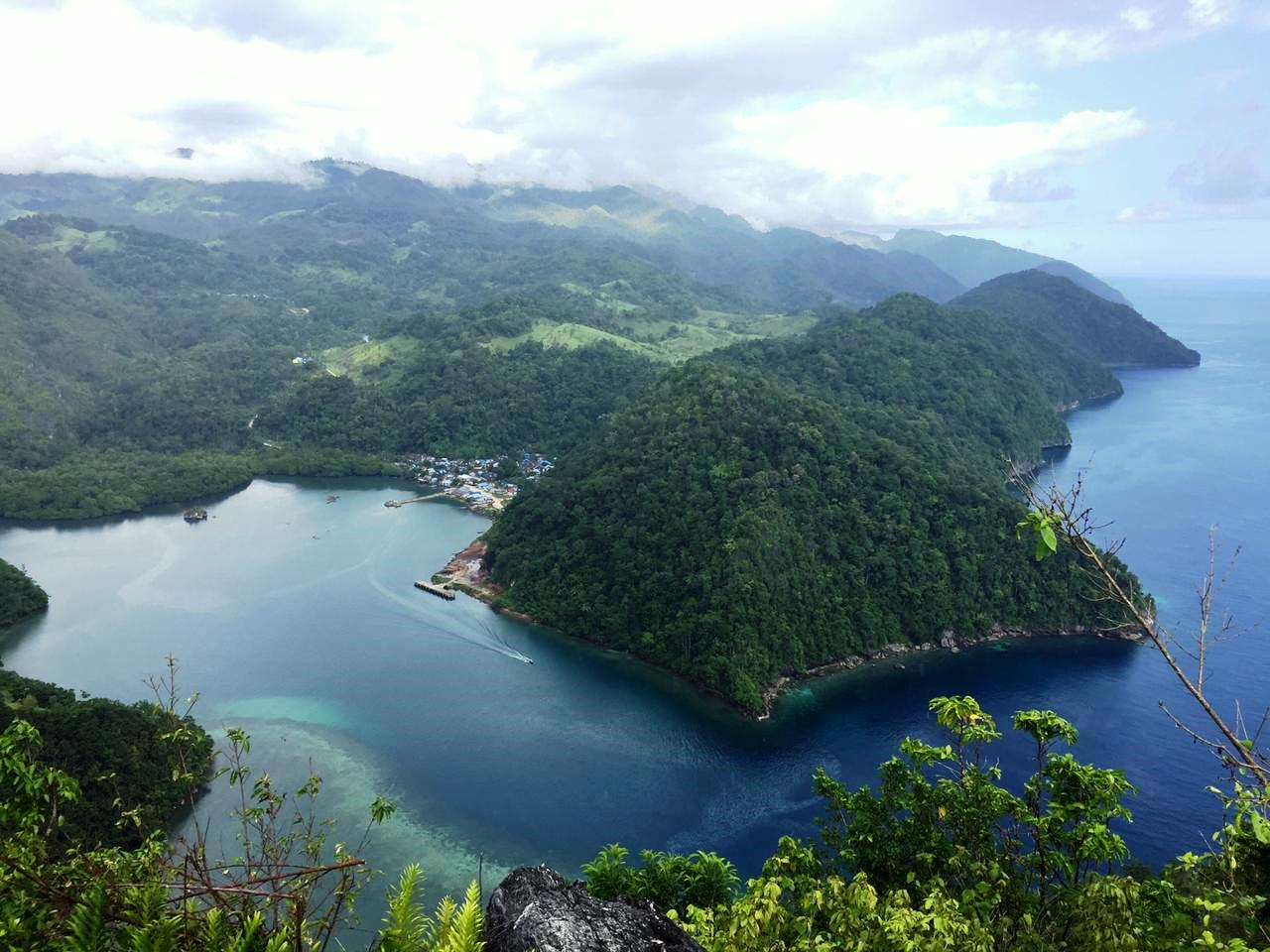
- Village of Tifu in South Buru

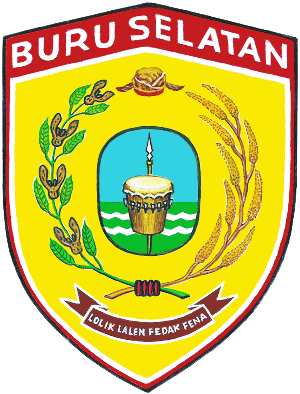
- Coat of arms
- Motto: Lolik Lalen Fedak Fena (Unite Hearts to Build the Nation)
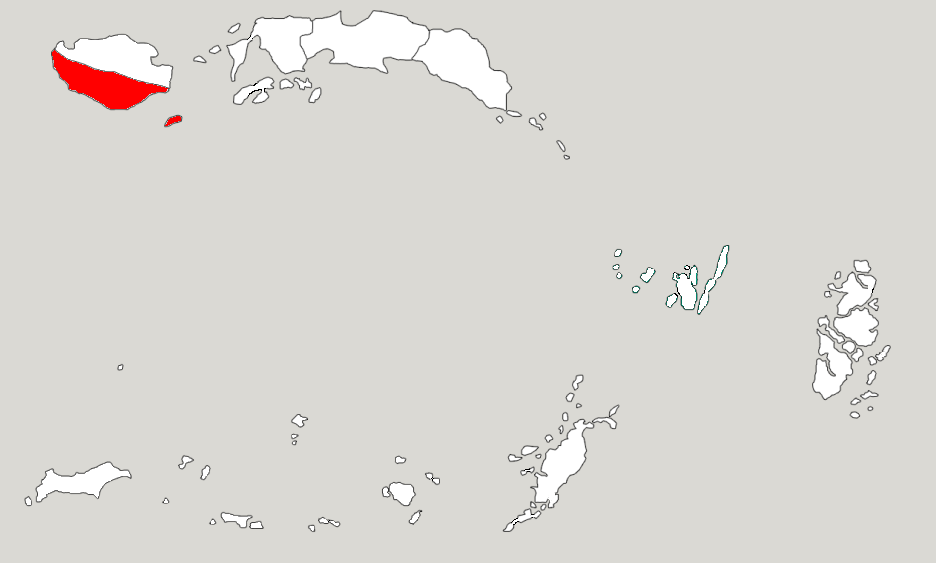
- Location within Maluku

- Location in Maluku and Indonesia South Buru Regency (Indonesia)
- Coordinates: 3°51′S 126°42′E
- Country: Indonesia
- Province: Maluku
- Capital: Namrole

Government
  - Regent: La Hamidi
  - Vice Regent: Gerson Eliaser Selsily

Area
  - Total: 5,060 km^{2} (1,950 sq mi)

Population (mid 2023 estimate)
  - Total: 79,017
  - Density: 15.6/km^{2} (40.4/sq mi)
- Time zone: UTC+9 (IEST)
- Area code: (+62) 913
- Website: burselkab.go.id

South Buru Regency is a regency of Maluku, Indonesia. It was created on 24 June 2008 by being split off from the existing Buru Regency. It is located on the island of Buru, of which it comprises the southern 40%. The Regency (which includes the smaller island of Ambalau to the southeast of Buru Island) covers an area of 5,060 km^{2}, and it had a population of 53,671 at the 2010 Census, rising to 75,410 at the 2020 Census; the official estimate as at mid 2023 was 79,017 (comprising 39,952 males and 39,065 females). The principal town lies at Elfule in Namrole District.

== Administrative districts ==
At the time of the 2010 Census the regency was divided into five districts (kecamatan), but a sixth district (Fena Fafan) has been added by the splitting of the existing Leksula District. The six districts are tabulated below with their areas and their populations at the 2010 Census and the 2020 Census, together with the official estimates as at mid 2023. The table also includes the locations of the district headquarters, the number of administrative villages (all rated as rural desa) in each district, and its postal codes.

Kode Wilayah	Name of District (kecamatan)	Area in km^{2}	Pop'n Census 2010	Pop'n Census 2020	Pop'n Estimate mid 2023	Admin centre	No. of villages	Post codes
81.09.04	Kepala Madan ^{(a)}	1,276.00	9,411	12,210	12,991	Biloro	16	97541
81.09.05	Leksula ^{(b)}	1,899.61	14,900	14,071	14,267	Leksula	19	97543
81.09.06	Fena Fafan	528.39	^{(c)}	3,904	4,309	Waekatin	11	97542
81.09.01	Namrole ^{(d)}	326.00	10,809	20,874	22,373	Elfule	17	97544
81.09.02	Waesama ^{(e)}	724.00	11,505	15,196	15,853	Wamsisi	11	97545
81.09.03	Ambalau (island)	306.00	6,846	9,155	9,225	Siwar	7	97546
	Totals	5,060.00	53,671	75,410	79,017	Namrole	81	

Notes: (a) including three offshore islands. (b) including fifteen offshore islands. (c) the 2010 population of Fena Fafan District is included with the figure for Leksula District. (d) including four offshore islands. (e) including three offshore islands.

== Climate ==
Namrole, the seat of the regency has a tropical rainforest climate (Af) moderate rainfall from October to March and heavy to very heavy rainfall from April to September. Unlike most parts of Indonesia, the southern part of Buru island experiences a rainfall maximum during the low-sun season due to local wind currents.

Climate data for Namrole
Month	Jan	Feb	Mar	Apr	May	Jun	Jul	Aug	Sep	Oct	Nov	Dec	Year
Mean daily maximum °C (°F)	30.7 (87.3)	30.8 (87.4)	30.8 (87.4)	30.4 (86.7)	29.8 (85.6)	29.1 (84.4)	28.3 (82.9)	28.4 (83.1)	29.6 (85.3)	30.3 (86.5)	31.4 (88.5)	31.1 (88.0)	30.1 (86.1)
Daily mean °C (°F)	27.2 (81.0)	27.3 (81.1)	27.2 (81.0)	27.0 (80.6)	26.8 (80.2)	26.3 (79.3)	25.7 (78.3)	25.5 (77.9)	26.2 (79.2)	26.5 (79.7)	27.6 (81.7)	27.5 (81.5)	26.7 (80.1)
Mean daily minimum °C (°F)	23.8 (74.8)	23.8 (74.8)	23.7 (74.7)	23.7 (74.7)	23.8 (74.8)	23.6 (74.5)	23.1 (73.6)	22.7 (72.9)	22.8 (73.0)	22.7 (72.9)	23.9 (75.0)	23.9 (75.0)	23.5 (74.2)
Average rainfall mm (inches)	142 (5.6)	119 (4.7)	119 (4.7)	139 (5.5)	239 (9.4)	436 (17.2)	515 (20.3)	213 (8.4)	157 (6.2)	84 (3.3)	85 (3.3)	109 (4.3)	2,357 (92.9)
Source: Climate-Data.org
