= Central Maluku Regency =

Regency in Maluku, Indonesia

Central Maluku Regency Kabupaten Maluku Tengah
- Regency
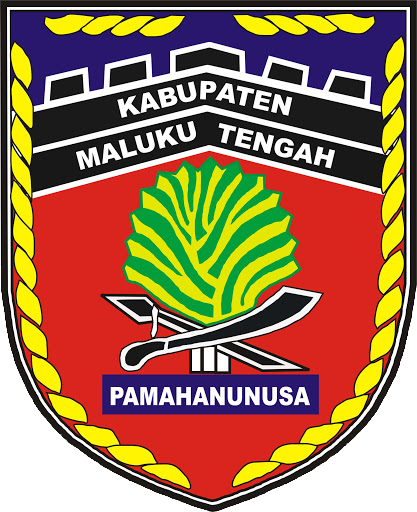
- Coat of arms
- Motto: Pamahanunusa (Building the Homeland and the Nation)
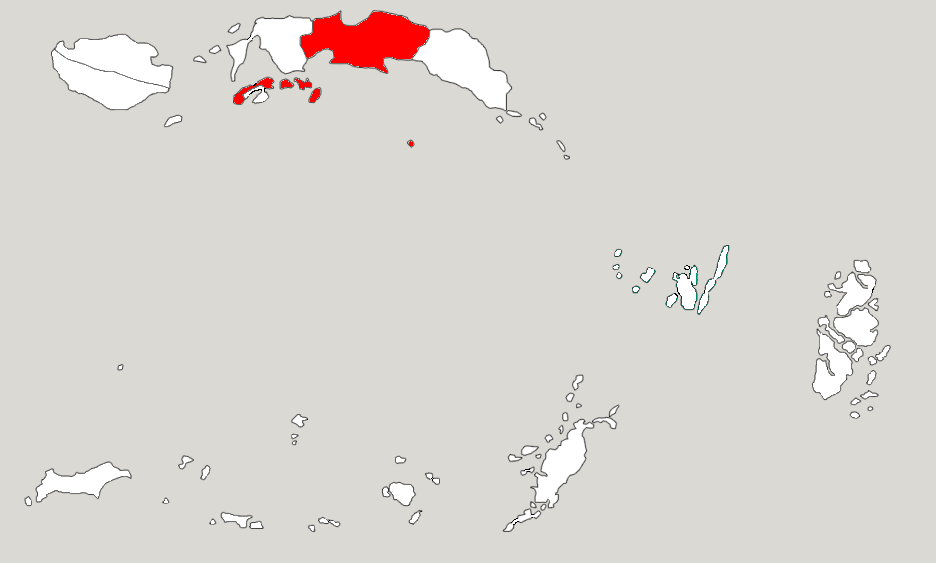
- Location within Maluku

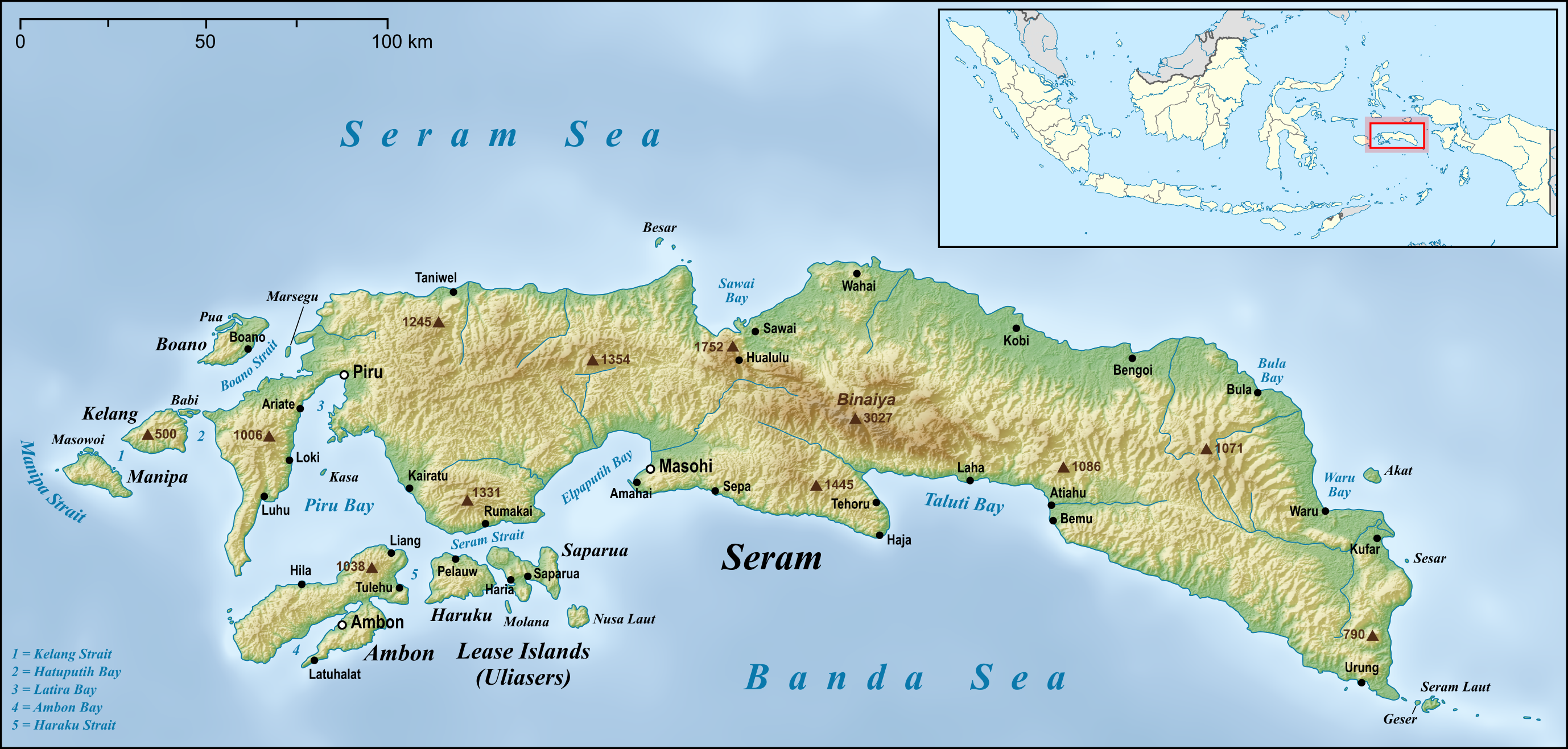
- Location in Seram, Maluku and Indonesia Central Maluku Regency (Maluku) Central Maluku Regency (Indonesia)
- Coordinates: 3°17′30″S 128°58′03″E
- Country: Indonesia
- Province: Maluku
- Capital: Masohi

Government
  - Regent: Zulkarnain Awat Amir
  - Vice Regent: Mario Lawalata

Area
  - Total: 11,595.57 km^{2} (4,477.07 sq mi)

Population (mid 2025 estimate)
  - Total: 435,735
  - Density: 37.5777/km^{2} (97.3258/sq mi)
- Time zone: UTC+9 (IEST)
- Area code: (+62) 914
- Website: maltengkab.go.id

Central Maluku Regency (Indonesian: Kabupaten Maluku Tengah) is a regency of Maluku Province of Indonesia. The Regency covers an area of 11,595.57 km^{2}, and had a population of 361,698 at the 2010 Census, and 423,094 at the 2020 Census. The official estimate as at mid 2025 was 435,735. The principal towns are Masohi (the administrative capital) and Amahai, both located on Seram Island. The regency (kebupaten) is composed of the central part of the island of Seram, the Banda Islands, and the Lease Islands (Saparua, Haruku, and Nusa Laut), together with those parts of Ambon Island which are outside the City of Ambon.

This regency is the largest in area among Malukan regencies.

== Geography ==
Central Maluku Regency is one of the regencies in Maluku Province. It is mainly located in the central part of Seram Island (between West Seram Regency in the west and East Seram Regency in the east, both of which were separated from Central Maluku Regency on 18 December 2003), but it also includes a number of islands to the south, chiefly Ambon Island (site of the provincial capital of the same name, but excluding the City of Ambon itself), the Lease Islands to the east of Ambon, and the Banda Islands much further to the south. The total area of Central Maluku Regency is approx 275,907 km^{2}, which consists of a sea area of 264,311.43 km^{2} and a land area of 11,595.57 km^{2}.

=== Climate ===
The Central Maluku region experiences a tropical marine climate and a monsoon climate. This is because Central Maluku is surrounded by vast seas, so that the tropical marine climate in this area is in rhythm with the existing seasonal climate. The following climatological conditions can describe the climatic conditions in Central Maluku Regency in general: The average temperature recorded in 2009 in Amahai District was 26.30C, where the maximum average temperature was 30.40C and the minimum average was 23.30C. The average amount of rainfall in 2009 was 185.1 mm with an average number of rainy days of 18.1 days. The average sun irradiation in 2009 was 65.9% with an average air pressure of 1,011.2 millibars and an average relative humidity of 84.9%.

== Administration ==
The regency is divided into eighteen districts (kecamatan), tabulated below with their areas (in km^{2}) and their populations at the 2010 Census and the 2020 Census, together with the official estimates as at mid 2025. The table also includes the locations of the district administrative centres, the number of administrative villages in each district (a total of 186 rural desa and 6 urban kelurahan), and its post code.

Kode Wilayah	Name of District (kecamatan)	English name	Admin Centre	Area in km^{2}	Pop'n Census 2010	Pop'n Census 2020	Pop'n Estimate mid 2025	No. of villages	Post code
81.01.15	Leihitu ^{(a)}		Hila	147.63	46,978	53,728	55,370	11	97580
81.01.22	Leihitu Barat	West Leihitu	Larike	84.47	16,678	19,543	19,760	5	97581
81.01.14	Salahutu		Tulehu	151.82	46,703	54,798	54,328	6 ^{(b)}	97582
	(totals on Ambon Island)			383.92	110,359	128,069	129,458	22	
81.01.13	Pulau Haruku	Haruku Island	Pelauw	150.00	24,207	27,390	26,051	11	97583
81.01.12	Saparua		Kota Saparua	79.90	32,475	18,402	17,552	7	97584
81.01.26	Saparua Timur	East Saparua	Tuhaha	96.60	^{(c)}	17,620	16,607	10	97585
81.01.16	Nusa Laut	Nusa Laut; Island	Ameth	32.50	5,322	5,780	5,293	7	97518
	(totals on Lease Islands)			359.00	62,004	69,192	65,503	35	
81.01.01	Amahai		Amahai	1,619.07	38,932	50,028	51,512	^{(d)} 15	97516
81.01.17	Kota Masohi	Masohi Town	Masohi	37.30	31,480	36,433	36,696	^{(e)} 5	97511 -97515
81.01.06	Seram Utara	North Seram	Wahai	7,173.46	39,249	19,681	21,861	^{(f)} 20	97531
81.01.20	Seram Utara; Barat ^{(g)}	Northwest; Seram	Pasanea	705.48	9,260	12,024	13,223	13	97532
81.01.25	Seram Utara; Timur Kobi	Northeast; Seram Kobi	Kobi	280.65	^{(h)}	12,682	14,208	12	97533
81.01.24	Seram Utara; Timur Seti	Northeast; Seram Seti	Kobisonta	186.19	^{(h)}	14,975	17,072	12	97534
81.01.11	Tehoru		Tehoru	405.72	28,191	22,486	25,238	10	97519
81.01.21	Teluk Elpaputih	Elpaputih Bay	Sahulau	120.00	10,822	9,166	9,749	4	97517
81.01.23	Telutih		Laimu	128.50	^{(i)}	12,838	13,913	10	97510
81.01.02	Teon Nila Serua		Waipia	24.28	12,857	14,594	14,765	16	97535
	(totals on Seram Island)			10,680.65	170,791	204,907	218,237	117	
81.01.09	Banda	Banda Islands	Nusantara	172.00	18,544	20,924	22,537	18	97586

Notes: (a) including the small offshore islands of Ela, Hatala and Lain off the northwest corner of Ambon Island.
(b) comprising the six villages (desa) of Tulehu (with 19,878 inhabitants as at mid 2024), Suli (11,244), Liang (8,520), Waai (8,320), Tial (3,211) and Tengah-Tengah (2,762).
(c) the 2010 population figure for Saparua Timur is included in that for Saparua.
(d) comprises the kelurahan of Hollo (with 1,710 inhabitants in mid 2024) and 14 desa including Haruru (9,801), Tamilouw (8,373), Sepa (7,975), Soahuku (4,730), Makariki (3,990) and Amahai (3,772).
(e) comprises the five kelurahan of Namaelo (with 15,437 inhabitants as at mid 2024), Ampera (6,414), Letwaru (6,245), Lesane (4,597) and Namasina (3,877).
(f) the major desa are Wahai, the admin centre (with 5,886 inhabitants as at mid 2024), Sawai (3,169), Manusela (1,636), Pasahari (1,621) and Malaku (1,689).
(g) includes Pulau Besar (on which the admin centre Pasanea is located) and smaller islands (a total of 4.6 km^{2} with 1,040 inhabitants in mid 2022) off the north coast of Seram.
(h) 2010 population figures for Seram Utara Timur Kobi and Seram Utara Timur Seti are included in that for Seram Utara.
(i) 2010 population figure for Telutih is included in that for Tehoru.

== National Park and Nature Reserve ==
The northern part of Central Seram includes the Manusela National Park, which covers an area of 133,000 hectares. Four villages - Manusela, Ilena Maraina, Selumena and Kanike - form an enclave within the National Park. Further along Seram's northern coast to the west of the National Park is situated the Wae Mual Nature Reserve, covering another 35,800 hectares and now a part of the National Park.

== Transport ==
Central Maluku Regency has developed sea and air transportation infrastructure to support regional connectivity and accessibility. The regency has one national port, Banda Neira Port in Banda District, three regional ports at Wahai, Amahai, and Tulehu, and a number of local ports throughout the regency. Air transportation is served by three airports: Amahai Airport in Amahai District, Wahai Airport in North Seram District, and Bandanaira Airport in Banda District.

== Villages ==
- Yaputih
