= Seram rain forests =

Ecoregion in Seram, Indonesia

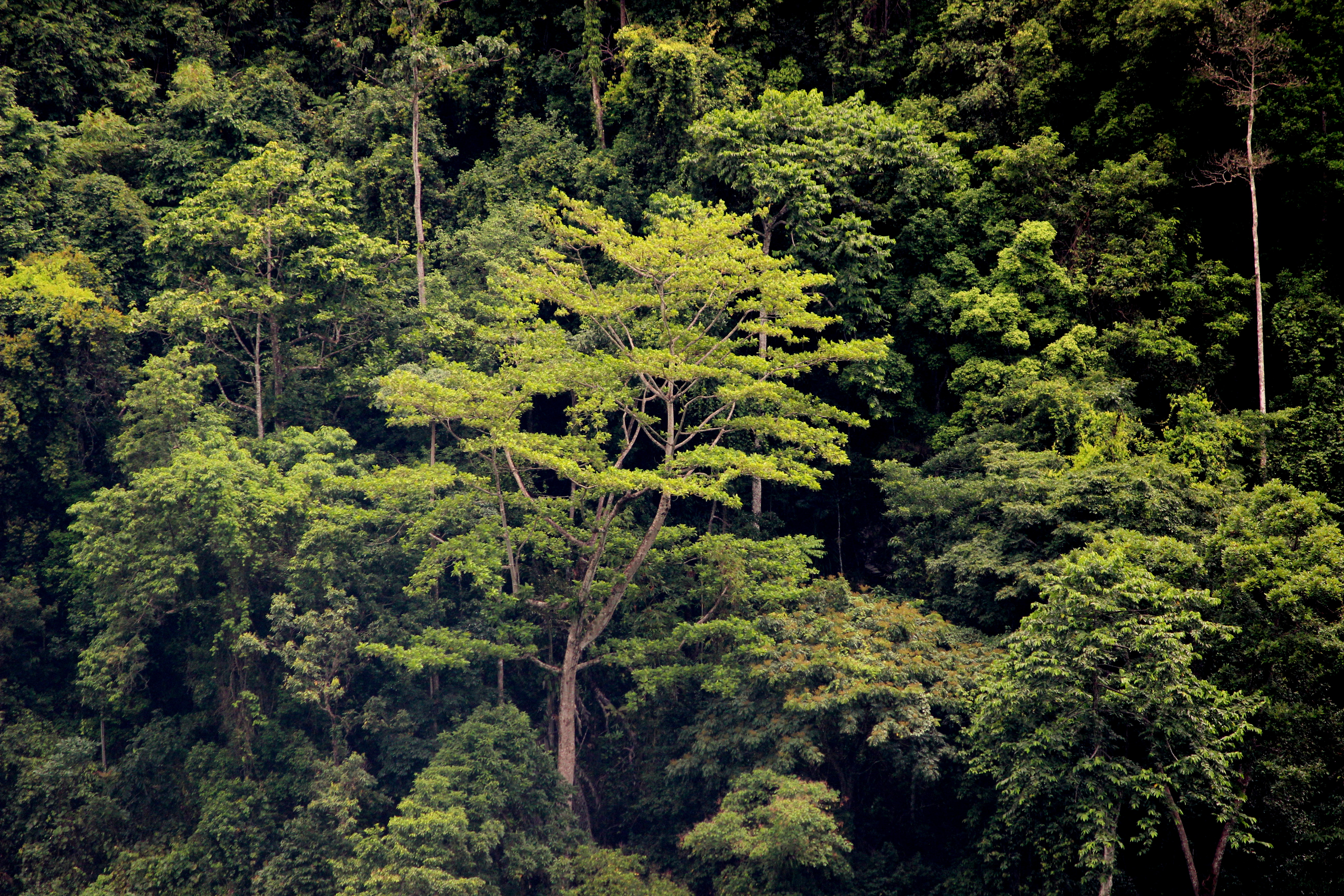
- Rain forest near Olas, Seram

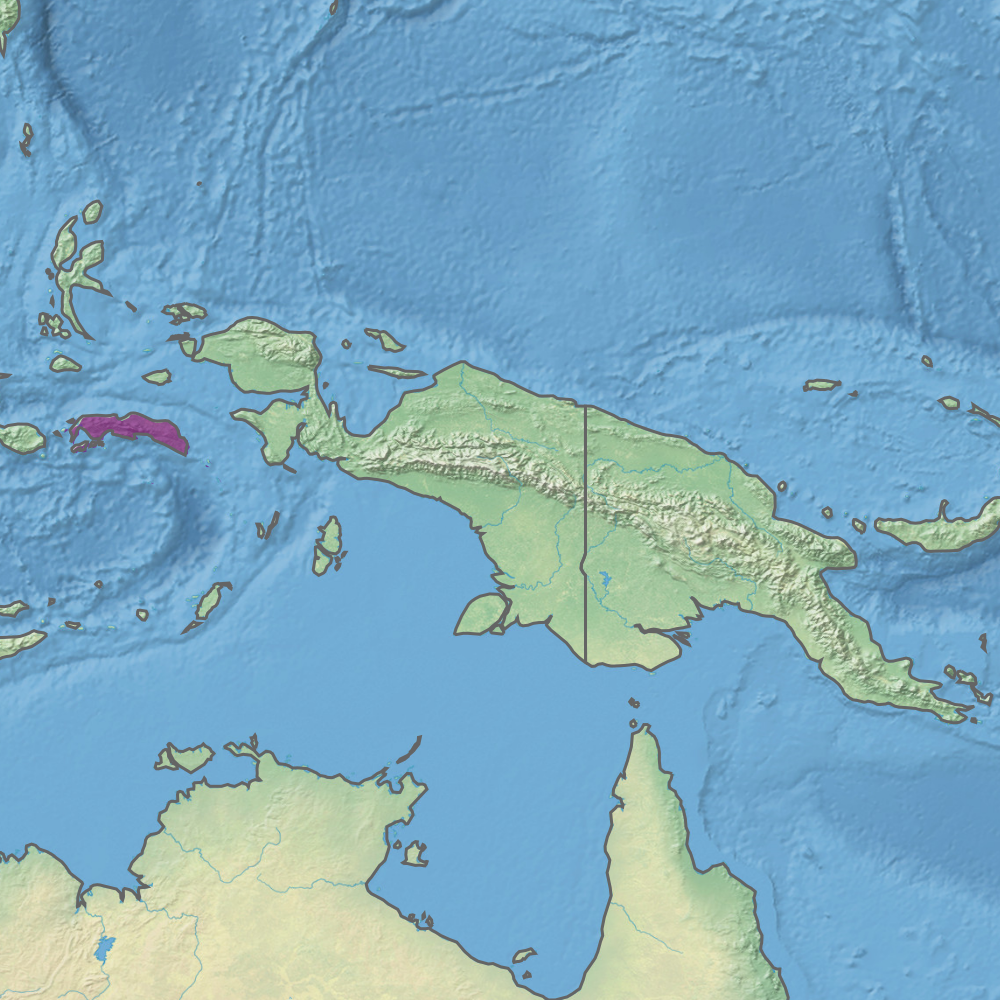
- Ecoregion territory (in purple)

Ecology
- Realm: Australasian realm
- Biome: tropical and subtropical moist broadleaf forests

Geography
- Area: 18,989 km^{2} (7,332 sq mi)
- Countries: Indonesia
- Province: Maluku
- Coordinates: 3.13°S 129.5°E

Conservation
- Conservation status: Relatively stable/intact
- Protected: 2,000 km^{2}%

The Seram rain forests is a tropical moist forest ecoregion in Indonesia. The ecoregion includes the island of Seram and neighboring islands.

== Geography ==
Seram is the largest island in the ecoregion, with an area of 17,100 km^{2} (6,600 sq mi). The ecoregion includes several neighboring smaller islands, including Ambon, Haruku, Saparua, and Manipa south and west of Seram, and the Gorong archipelago to the southeast. The islands are mountainous, and Mount Binaiya (3,027 meters) on Seram is the highest point.

The islands that make up the ecoregion are part of Wallacea, a group of islands that are part of the Australasian realm, but were never joined to either the Australian or Asian continents. The islands of Wallacea are home to a mix of plants and animals from both terrestrial realms, and have many unique species that evolved in isolation. The Seram Sea bounds the ecoregion on the north and east, and the Banda Sea lies to the south. Lydekker's Line runs through the Seram Sea; the line demarcates the islands of Wallacea from the islands on the Australia-New Guinea continental shelf which were joined during the ice ages when sea levels were lower.

== Climate ==
The ecoregion has a tropical rain forest climate.

== Flora ==
The main plant communities are tropical lowland evergreen rain forest, semi-evergreen rain forest, and montane rain forest.

== Fauna ==
The ecoregion is home to 38 mammal species. Six species are endemic to the ecoregion: the Seram bandicoot (Rhynchomeles prattorum), Spiny Ceram rat (Rattus feliceus), Dusky mosaic-tailed rat (Melomys aerosus), Manusela mosaic-tailed rat (Melomys fraterculus), Ceram rat (Nesoromys ceramicus), and possibly the Silvery flying fox (Pteropus argentatus).

The ecoregion is home to 213 bird species. 16 species are endemic to the ecoregion. The ecoregion corresponds to the Seram endemic bird area. The largest bird in the ecoregion is the flightless southern cassowary (Casuarius casuarius).

== Protected areas ==
A 2017 assessment found that 2,000 km^{2} (770 sq mi), or 11 percent, of the ecoregion consists of protected areas. Approximately three-quarters of the unprotected area is still forested. Protected areas include Manusela National Park on Seram.
