= Manusela National Park =

National park in Indonesia

- IUCN category II (national park)
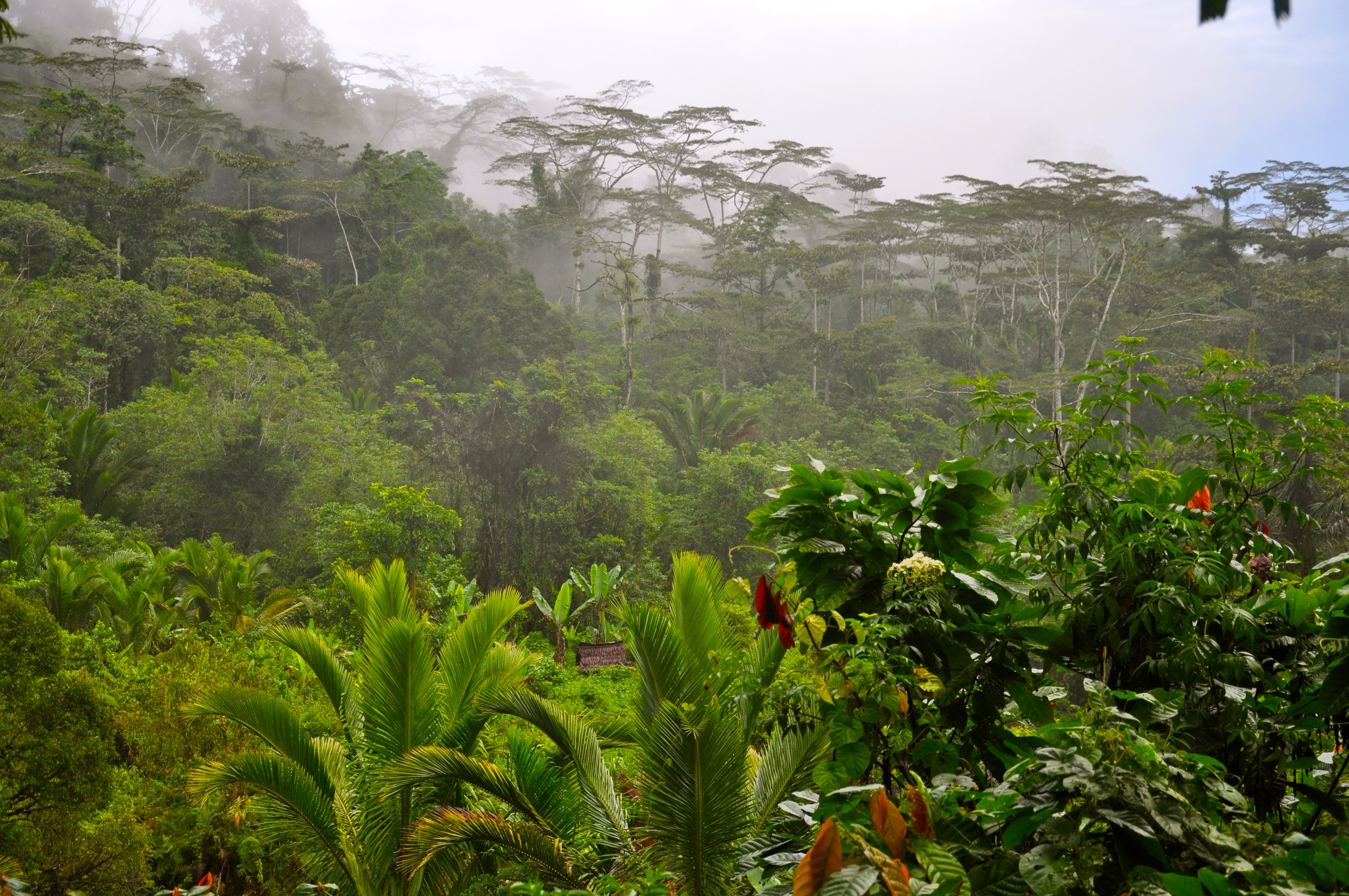
- The jungle of Manusela National Park

- Location within Maluku
- Location: Maluku, Indonesia
- Nearest city: Ambon
- Coordinates: 3°3′S 129°26′E
- Area: 1,890 km^{2} (730 sq mi)
- Established: 1997
- Governing body: Ministry of Forestry

Manusela National Park is located on Seram island, in the Maluku archipelago of Indonesia. It is made up of coastal forest, swamp forest, lowland and montane rainforest ecosystem types. Mount Binaiya at 3,027 meters, is the highest of the park's six mountains. Seram is remarkable for its high degree of localised bird endemism. The park also includes important karst landscapes. On Mount Hatu Saka, near the coast of Saleman-Sawai, it is the Goa Hatusaka, currently the deepest cave of the whole Indonesia.

== Vegetation and fauna ==
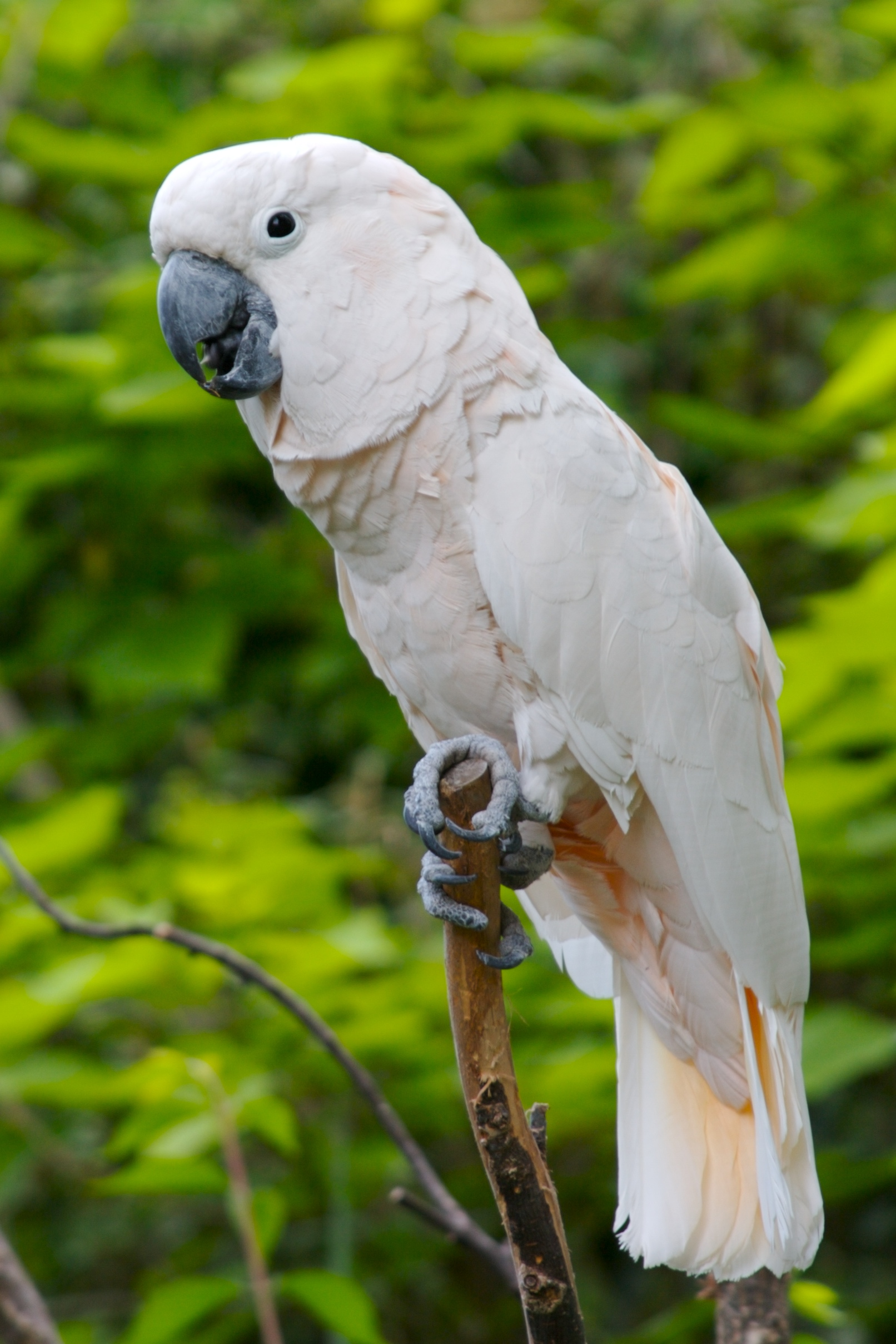
The salmon-crested cockatoo is a threatened species which has a stronghold in the national park

Among the plants that grow in this park are Avicennia, Dryobalanops and Pandanus species, Alstonia scholaris, Terminalia catappa, Shorea selanica, Octomeles sumatrana, Bruguiera sexangula, Melaleuca leucadendra, Pometia pinnata, and various species of orchid.

Of the 118 species of bird on the island, 15 are endemic, including the eclectus parrot, purple-naped lory, salmon-crested cockatoo, lazuli kingfisher, sacred kingfisher, grey-necked friarbird, Moluccan king parrot, bicoloured white-eye, Boano monarch, and Seram masked owl.

The mammals found on Seram include Asian species (murid rodents) as well as Australasian marsupials. The montane area of Seram supports the greatest number of endemic mammals of any island in the region. It harbors 38 mammal species and includes nine species that are endemic or near endemic, several of which are limited to montane habitats. These include the Seram bandicoot, Moluccan flying fox, Seram flying-fox, Manusela mosaic-tailed rat, spiny Ceram rat and the Ceram rat, all considered threatened.

== Human habitation ==
There are four villages in the park: Manusela, Ilena Maraina, Selumena and Kanike. Manusela is also the name of one of the mountains within the park, the local ethnic group and their language. In the local language Manusela means "bird of freedom".

== Conservation and threats ==
In 1972 two areas in central Seram were designated as nature reserves: Wae Nua (20,000 ha) and Wae Mual (17,500 ha). After a survey in 1978 a proposal was made to unite the two areas to form Manusela National Park. Manusela National Park was established in 1997, to protect an area of 1,890 km^{2}, representing 11% of the land area of Seram island.

A major threat is posed by deforestation, with logging concessions covering 48% of Seram's forest, and illegal logging even having been recorded inside Manusela National Park. Another threat is posed by illegal wild bird trading, particularly targeting the salmon-crested cockatoo. The population of the endemic salmon-crested cockatoo is now gravely threatened due to hunting and the destruction of its habitat, and the park remains its last stronghold. For the first time in 2006 nine cockatoos have been released in the wild after being confiscated from a smuggler in 2004.
