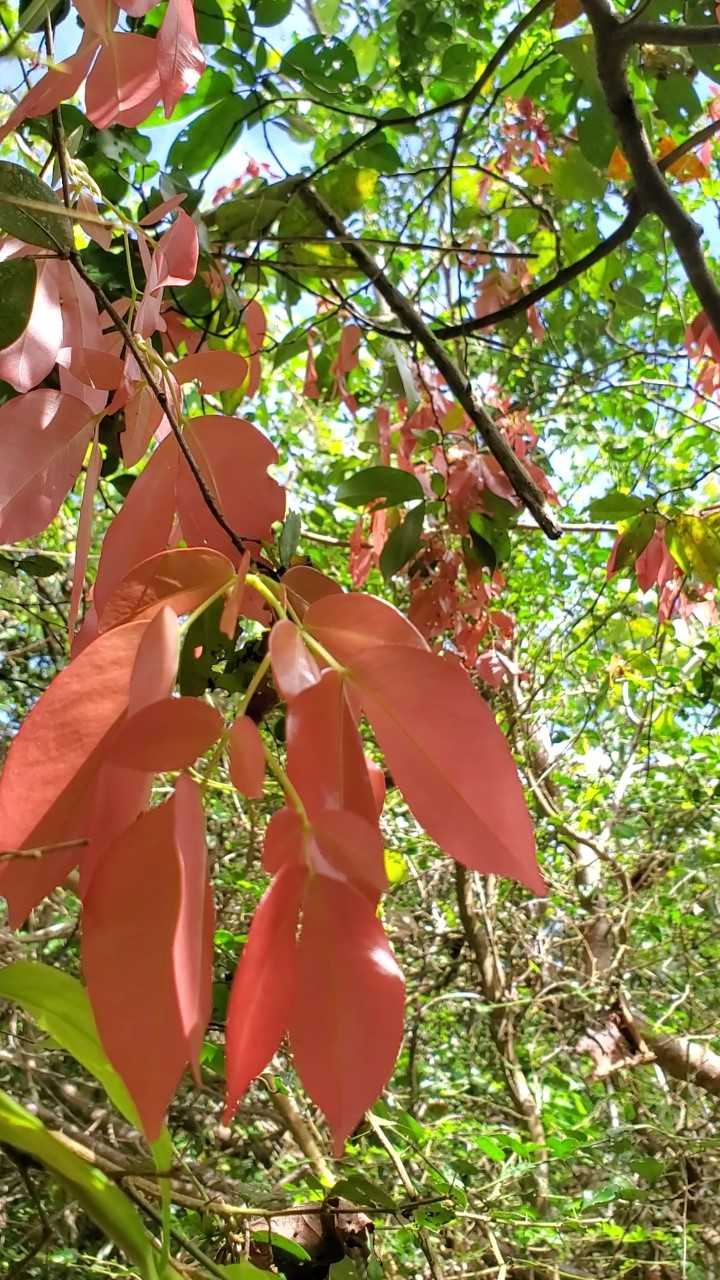
- Emergent pink leaves. Dededo, Guam

Conservation status
- Least Concern (IUCN 3.1)

Scientific classification
- Kingdom: Plantae
- Clade: Tracheophytes
- Clade: Angiosperms
- Clade: Eudicots
- Clade: Rosids
- Order: Fabales
- Family: Fabaceae
- Genus: Cynometra
- Species: C. ramiflora

Binomial name
- Cynometra ramiflora L.

Synonyms
- 12 synonyms: For var. bifoliolata; Cynometra bifoliolata Merr.; for var. ramiflora; Afzelia australis F.M.Bailey; Cynometra bijuga Span. ex Miq.; Cynometra carolinensis Kaneh.; Cynometra hosinoi Kaneh.; Cynometra neocaledonica Guillaumin; Cynometra ramiflora var. bijuga (Span. ex Miq.) Benth.; Cynometra ramiflora subsp. bijuga (Span. ex Miq.) Prain; Cynometra ramiflora var. heterophylla Thwaites; Cynometra schumanniana Harms; Cynometra whitfordii Elmer; Limonia diphylla Houtt.

= Cynometra ramiflora =

Species of legume

A tree in the family Fabaceae, Cynometra ramiflora is found in mangroves and flooded forests from New Caledonia in the western Pacific west to Queensland in Australia, New Guinea, Island Southeast Asia, and Tropical Asia as far west as India. Its wood is used for construction and fuel, and parts of plant are ascribed medicinal use.

== Description ==
The tree grows up to 10-20 m tall. The trunks dbh is up to 60 cm, it can be buttressed or multistemmed, and has a red blaze (longitudinal cut exposure of bark). Leaves are compound with one, rarely two, pairs of leaflets. New leaves are pink. Lateral veins form loops well inside blade margin. Inflorescence axis is up to 20 mm long, up to 20-flowered, petal are white. Fruit is an asymmetrical, roughly globose nut, roughly 45 × 39 × 34 mm, rust brown and woody, solitary seed. Flowering while in cultivation has been recorded in August and October, fruiting has been recorded in Queensland in October and in cultivation in May.

In Australia, C. ramiflora can be distinguished from other Cynometra species by the glabrous rachis and petiolules of the leaves (though these are minutely hairy or glabrescent on Christmas Island), the globose fruit with a small beak near the apex of the dorsal side, and by the pink new leaves.

== Habitat ==
Cynometra ramiflora grows on both rocky and sandy seashores, besides tidal rivers, on the landward side of mangrove forests, and in inland forests up to 400 m elevation. It is particularly found in environments that experience flooding or high soil moisture. It is found in primary, secondary and disturbed forests. In the native limestone forest of the island of Saipan (largest of the Northern Mariana Islands), it is co-dominant in the canopy with Pisonia grandis and, along with Guamia mariannae, it is most common in the understorey. At Cape York Peninsula, Queensland, and Christmas Island it grows in mangrove forest and adjacent rainforest, particularly seasonally flooded areas, at elevation from sea level to 20 m. In Cambodia it grows in back-mangrove forests and freshwater flooded forests.

== Distribution ==
The species is found in New Caledonia, Caroline Islands, Solomon Islands, Guam, Federated States of Micronesia, Northern Mariana Islands, Queensland (Australia), Bismarck Archipelago, New Guinea, Maluku, Palau, Lesser Sunda Islands, East Timor, Sulawesi, Philippines, Borneo, Java, Sumatra, Christmas Island, Singapore, Malaysia, Thailand, Cambodia, Nicobar Islands, Andaman Islands, Bangladesh, India, Sri Lanka. It has been naturalized in the Society Islands (Tahiti and others) In Queensland, it is known only from the tip of Cape York. In Myanmar it is found in the Tanintharyi and Ayeyarwady Regions and Rakhine State.

== Ecology ==
In Manusela National Park, Seram, eastern Indonesia, the fruit are eaten by Geoffroyus geoffroyi, the red-cheeked parrot, while the flowers or nectar are fed on by Philemon subcorniculatus, the Seram friarbird. The plant is a food source for the Nolidae moth Carea costiplaga Swinhoe, 1893.

== Conservation ==
The tree has been given the conservation status of least concern by the International Union for Conservation of Nature (IUCN). The IUCN states that even though it may be locally impacted by deforestation, it has a large and widespread population with no major threats. The species is assessed as critically endangered in Singapore.

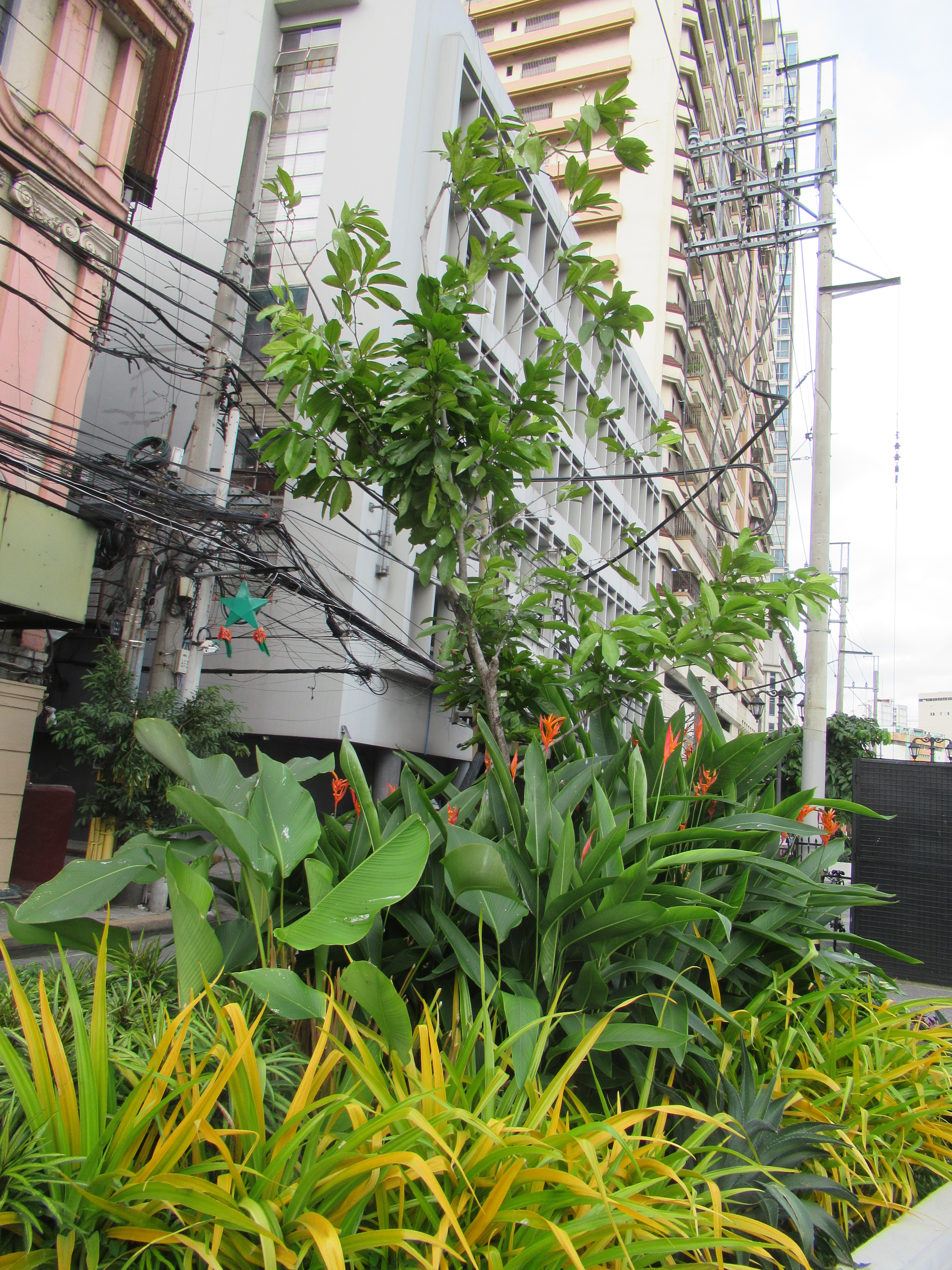
Cynometra ramiflora in Plaza Yuchengco

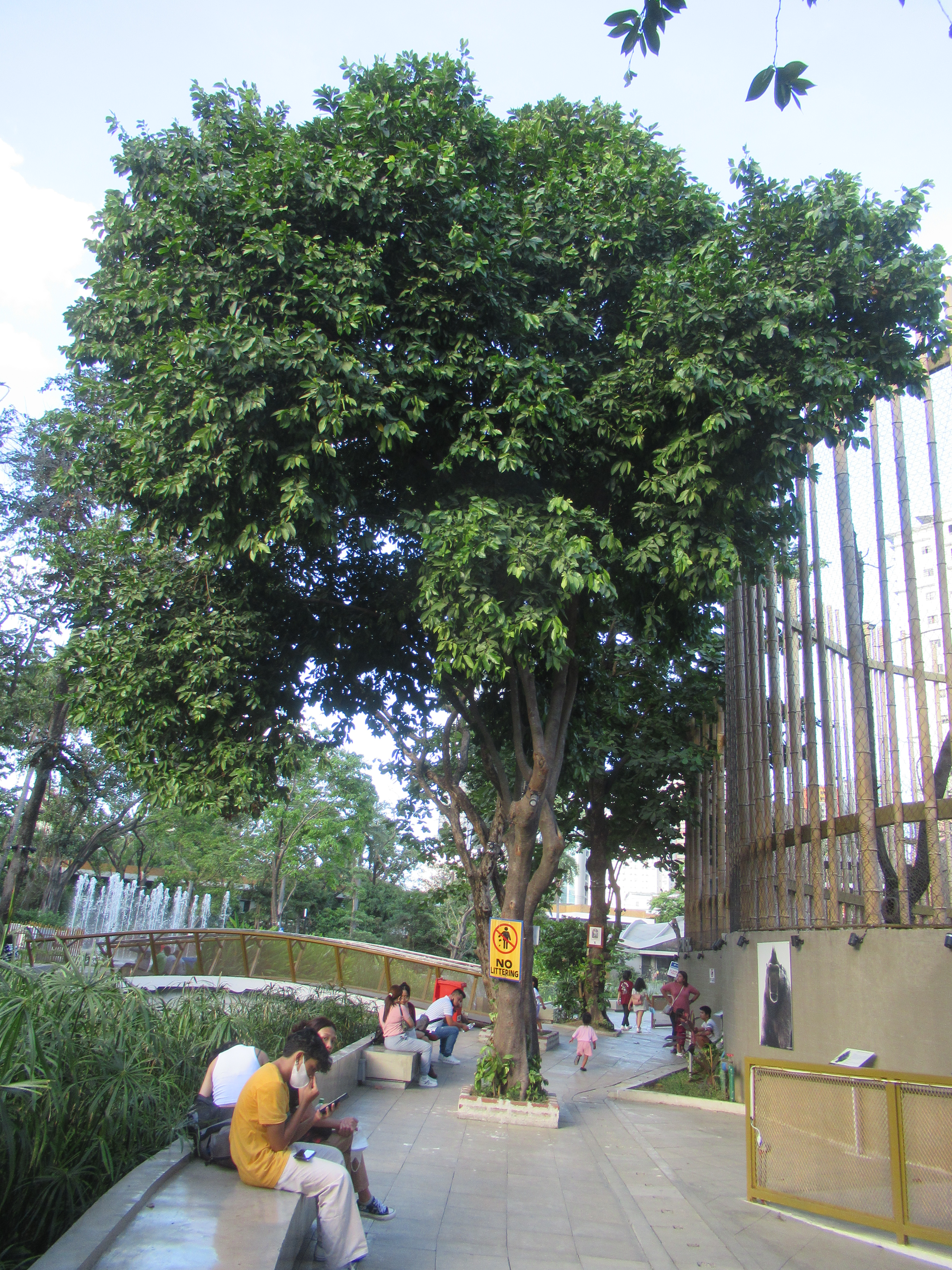
Balitbitan in Manila Zoo

== Etymology ==
The epithet of the species, ramiflora refers to the ramiflorous inflorescences, deriving from the Latin rami- (pertaining to branches) and -florus (flowered).

== Vernacular names ==
- cynometra, wrinkle pod mangrove (Australia)
- kateng, kepel, wunut (Indonesia)
- katong, katong laut (laut="ocean", Malay)
- châmpré:nh (Khmer)
- myinga, ye-minga (Myanmar)]
- Balitbitan (Philippines)

== Uses ==
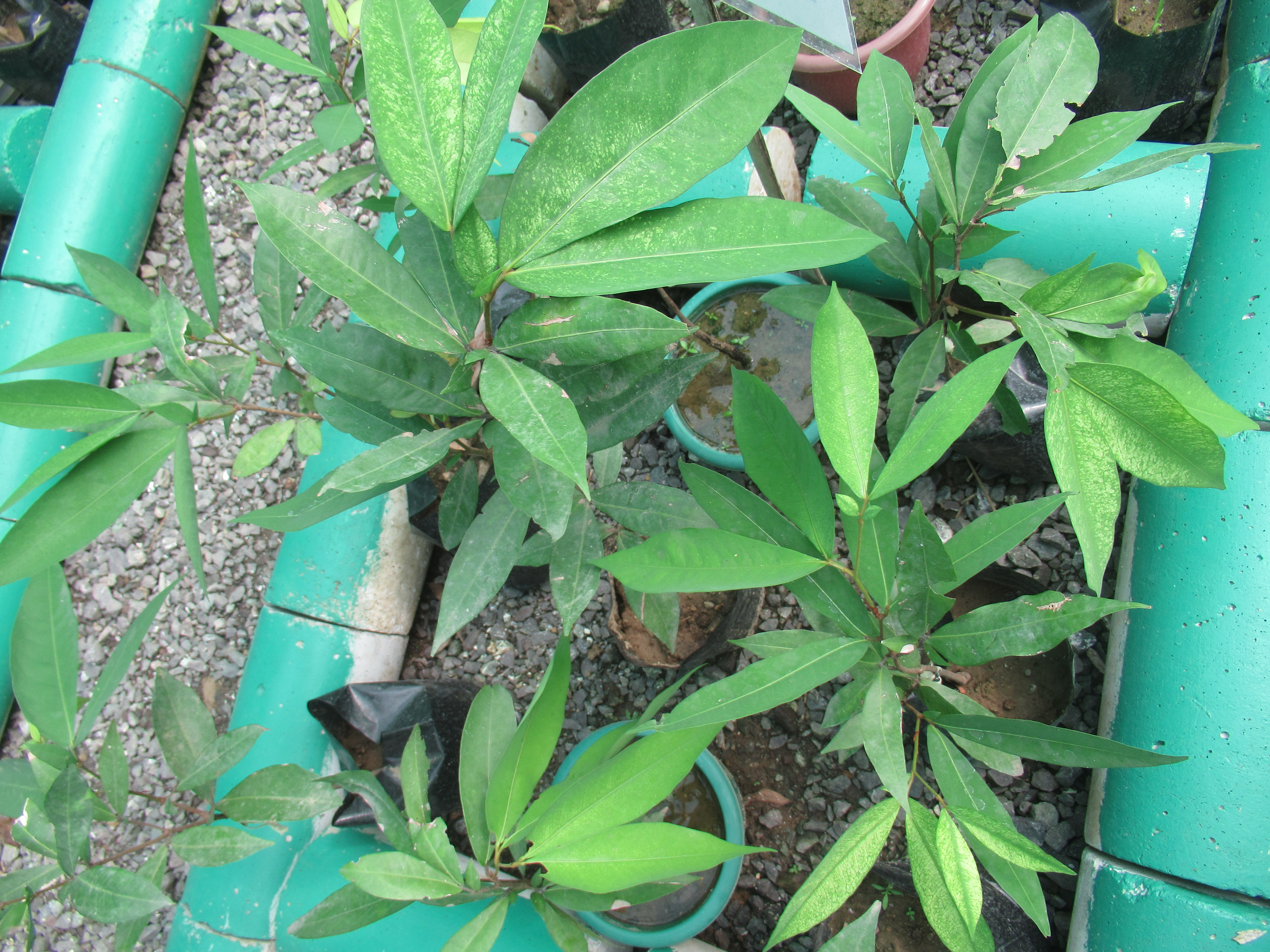
Seedlings

Cynometra ramiflora has hard and heavy timber, which is used in small volumes in construction, including for door posts. The wood is also used for tool handles, wood craft and ornamental work. The species is cultivated for ornamental purposes, and the leaves, roots and seeds are harvested for use in traditional medicine. The wood is used for temporary constructions in Cambodia. It makes excellent firewood. In India, in order to treat skin diseases, the leaf is boiled in cow's milk, mixed with honey and then applied externally. Oil from the seed is also used for skin diseases, applied externally, while the root is given as a purgative and cathartic.

Amongst the Rejang people of southwestern Sumatera, C. ramiflora is one of the trees that are most frequently regarded as a sialang tree. These are trees, tall and outstanding in the forest, with a nest of the honeybee Apis dorsata. Each sialang tree is held to have a sacred occupant, usually a female deity (though sometimes called Sernad Belelkat) who is the owner of the bees, nest and honey. To gather the wild honey from this tree is regarded as going into the perilous realm of the spirit world, and appropriate precautions need to be taken.
