= Mount Binaiya =

Mountain on Seram island in Indonesia

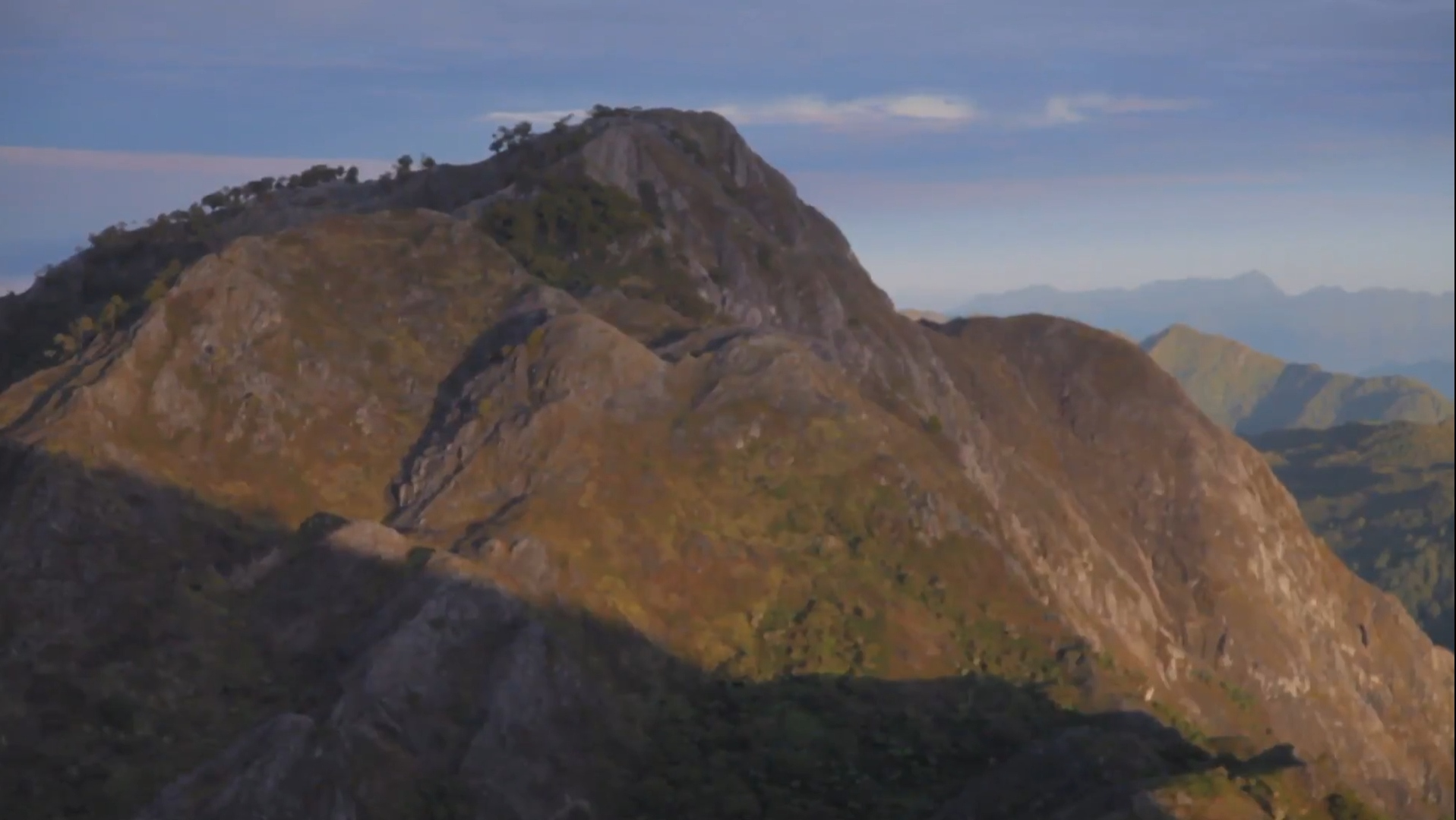
- Mount Binaiya at Manusela NP

Highest point
- Elevation: 3,027 m (9,931 ft)
- Prominence: 3,027 m (9,931 ft); Ranked 88th
- Listing: Island high point Ultra; Ribu
- Coordinates: 3°10′24″S 129°27′18″E

Geography
- Location within Indonesia
- Location: Seram, Maluku Province, Indonesia

Mount Binaiya (Indonesian: Gunung Binaiya) is the highest point on the Indonesian island of Seram (or Ceram) and the highest mountain in the province of Maluku. With an elevation of 3,027 metres (9,931 ft), it is the 88th most topographically prominent peak on Earth.

Mount Binaiya or Binaya located at Manusela National Park with endemic biodiversity like cassowary, cuscus, Seram friarbird, Moluccan king parrot, Ternate parrot (Lorius garrulus), purple-naped parrot/blackhead parrot (Lorius domicella), Ceram Cockatoo (Cacatua moluccensis), kingfisher (Todiramphus lazuli and Todiramphus sanctus), big Seram honeybird (Philemon subcorniculatus), and Ceram bat (Pteropus ocularis).

== See also ==
- List of ultras of the Malay Archipelago
