= D. concinna =

D. concinna may refer to:

- Delma concinna, a legless lizard
- Demetrida concinna, a ground beetle
- Derocrania concinna, a ground beetle
- Diminovula concinna, a sea snail
- Discodoris concinna, a sea slug
- Diuris concinna, a herbaceous plant
- Dodonaea concinna, a flowering plant
- Dracaena concinna, a plant used in traditional Chinese medicine
- Dromica concinna, a ground beetle
- Dryandra concinna, a Western Australian shrub
- Ducula concinna, a large pigeon
