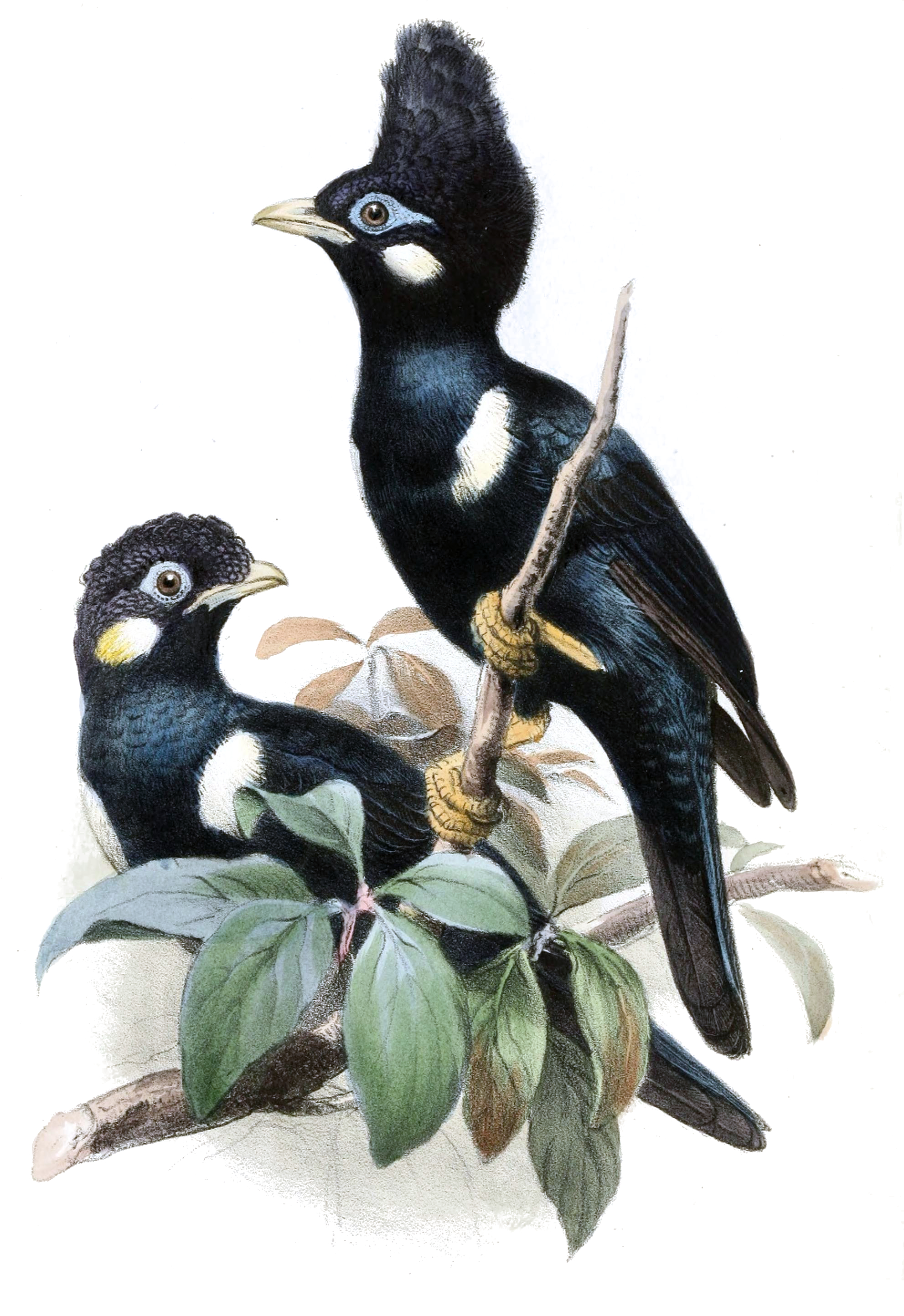
- B. corythaix and B. celebensis

Scientific classification
- Kingdom: Animalia
- Phylum: Chordata
- Class: Aves
- Order: Passeriformes
- Family: Sturnidae
- Genus: Basilornis; Bonaparte, 1850

Type species
- Pastor corythaix Wagler, 1827

= Basilornis =

Genus of birds

Basilornis is a genus of mynas in the family Sturnidae. Established by Charles Lucien Bonaparte in 1850, it contains the following three species:

Image	Common name	Scientific name
	Sulawesi myna	Basilornis celebensis
	Long-crested myna	Basilornis corythaix
	Helmeted myna	Basilornis galeatus

The Apo myna was formerly included in this genus, but has since been transferred to the monotypic genus Goodfellowia.

The name Basilornis is a combination of the Greek words basileus, meaning "king" and ornis, meaning "bird".
