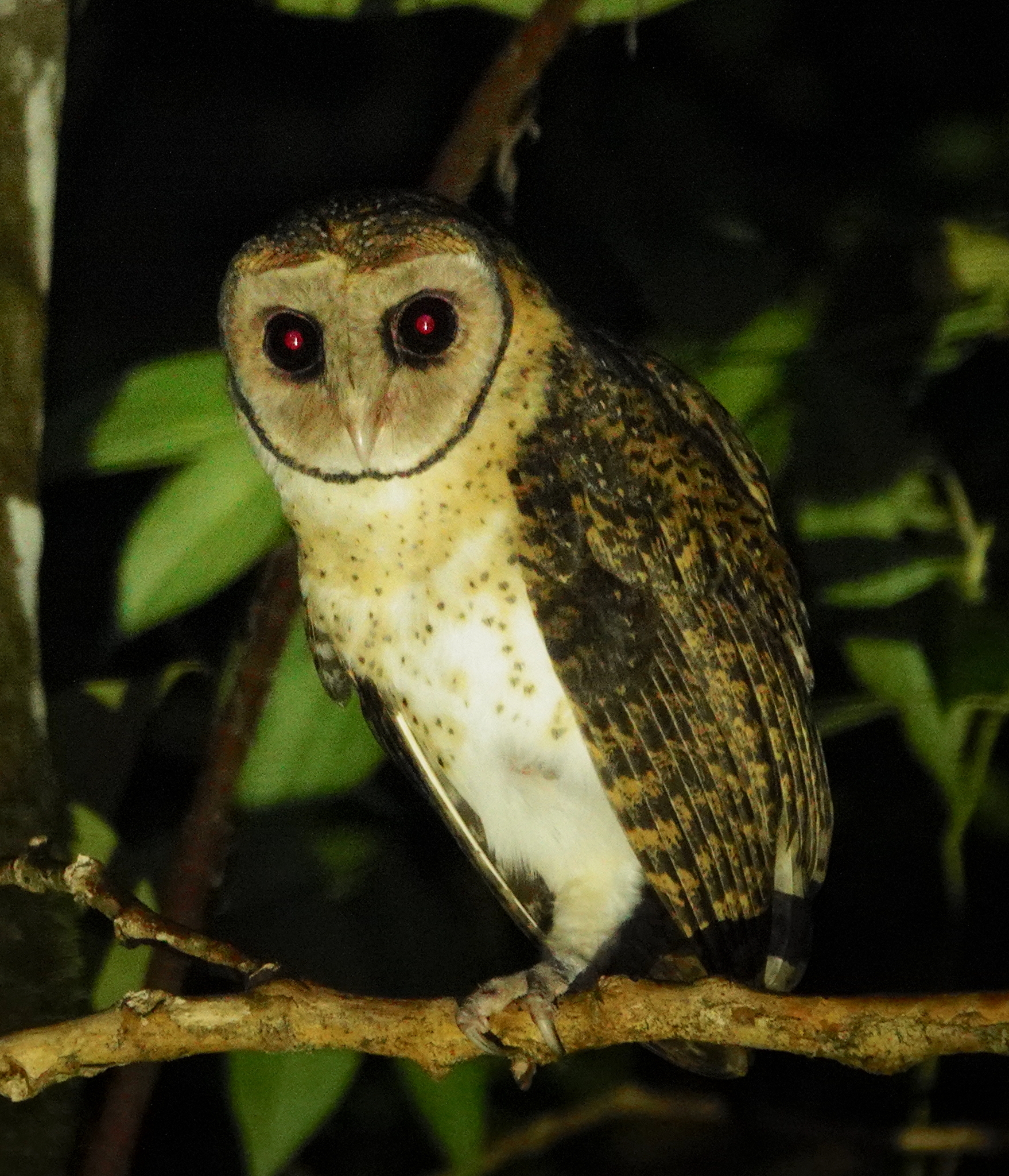

Conservation status
- Data Deficient (IUCN 3.1)

Scientific classification
- Kingdom: Animalia
- Phylum: Chordata
- Class: Aves
- Order: Strigiformes
- Family: Tytonidae
- Genus: Tyto
- Species: T. almae

Binomial name
- Tyto almae Jønsson et al., 2013

= Seram masked owl =

Species of bird

The Seram masked owl (Tyto almae) is an owl species in the family Tytonidae endemic to Seram Island in Indonesia, first described in 2013. It may be a subspecies of the Moluccan masked owl.

== Taxonomy ==
The existence of this bird was first indicated in 1987, when a photo of a Tyto sp. owl was taken by Rudi Badil and Sukianto Lusli in the Manusela National Park. The holotype of the species was caught via mist net in 2012, and formally described as a new species in 2013. The species' epithet commemorates Alma Jønsson, the daughter of Knud Andreas Jønsson, one authors of the species' description.

Version 15.1 of the IOC World Bird List currently treats this bird as a subspecies of the Moluccan masked owl (Tyto sororcula).

== Description ==
Measurements are only available for the holotype whose body length was 31 cm (12 in), and weighed 540 g (19 oz). The upperparts including the most upperwing coverts are covered densely and irregularly with fuscous spots. The background is ochre-buff to orange-buff.

== Status and conservation ==
Though no population data are available the Seram masked owl might be threatened by habitat loss. Therefore, the protection of the Manusela National Park is highly important for the long-term conservation of this species.
