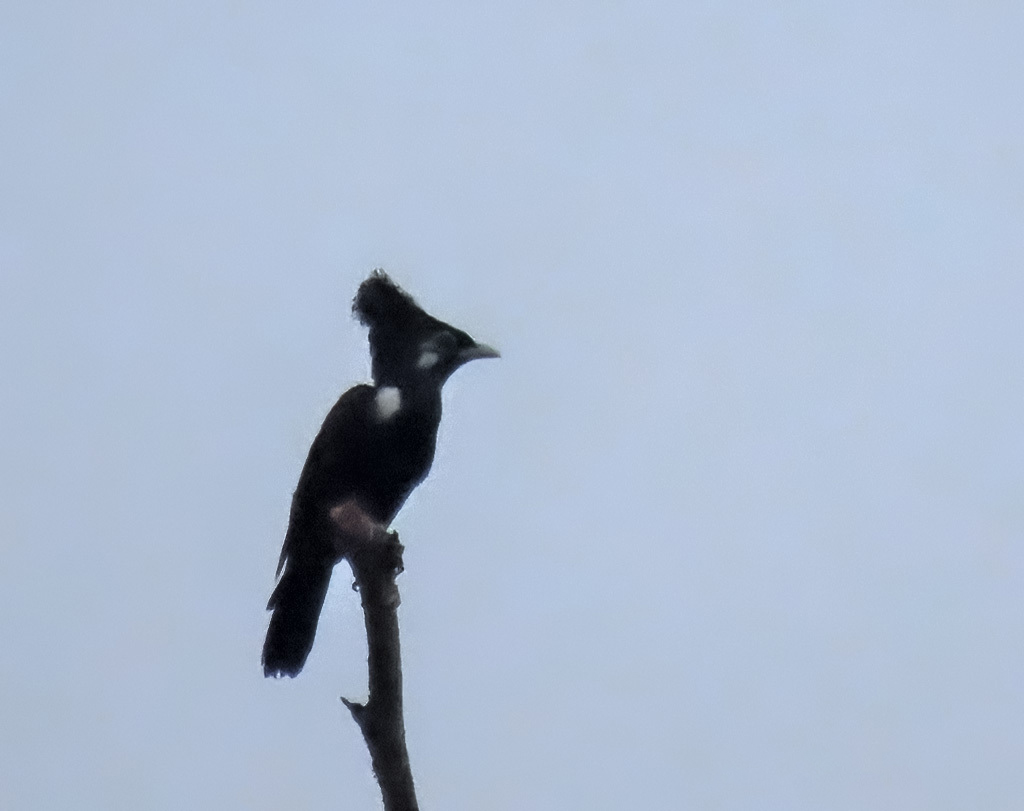

Conservation status
- Least Concern (IUCN 3.1)

Scientific classification
- Kingdom: Animalia
- Phylum: Chordata
- Class: Aves
- Order: Passeriformes
- Family: Sturnidae
- Genus: Basilornis
- Species: B. corythaix

Binomial name
- Basilornis corythaix (Wagler, 1827)

= Long-crested myna =

Species of bird

The long-crested myna (Basilornis corythaix) is a species of starling in the family Sturnidae. It is endemic to Seram Island.

Its natural habitats are subtropical or tropical moist lowland forest and subtropical or tropical moist montane forest.
