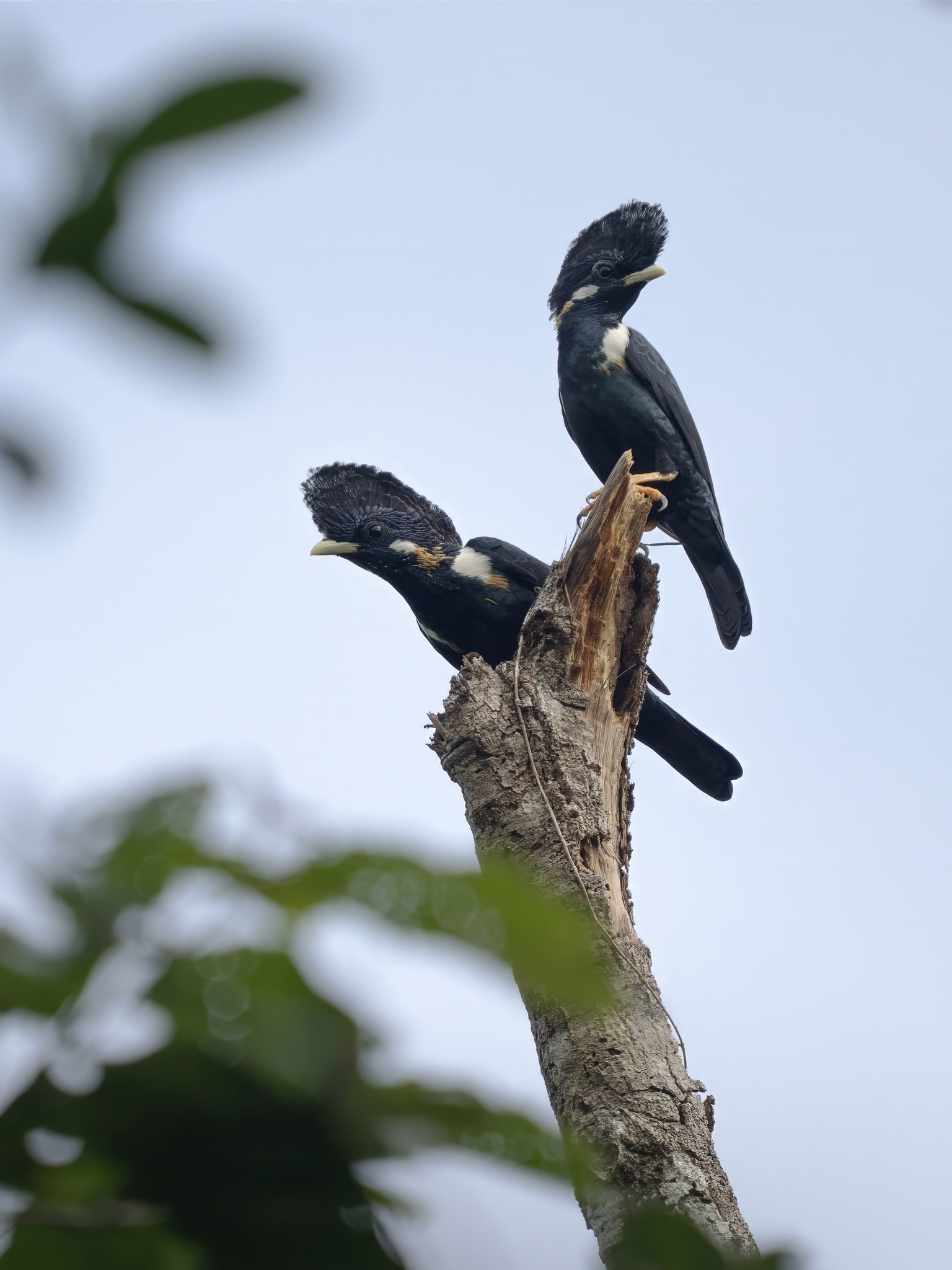

Conservation status
- Near Threatened (IUCN 3.1)

Scientific classification
- Kingdom: Animalia
- Phylum: Chordata
- Class: Aves
- Order: Passeriformes
- Family: Sturnidae
- Genus: Basilornis
- Species: B. galeatus

Binomial name
- Basilornis galeatus Meyer, 1894

= Helmeted myna =

Species of bird

The helmeted myna (Basilornis galeatus) is a species of starling in the family Sturnidae. It is endemic to Indonesia.

== Description ==
It is black with white spots on its face with a significant helmet-like crest.

== Habitat ==
Its natural habitats are subtropical or tropical moist lowland forest, subtropical or tropical moist montane forest, and swamps. It is threatened by habitat loss.
