= Seram Island =

Main island of Maluku Province, Indonesia

Seram
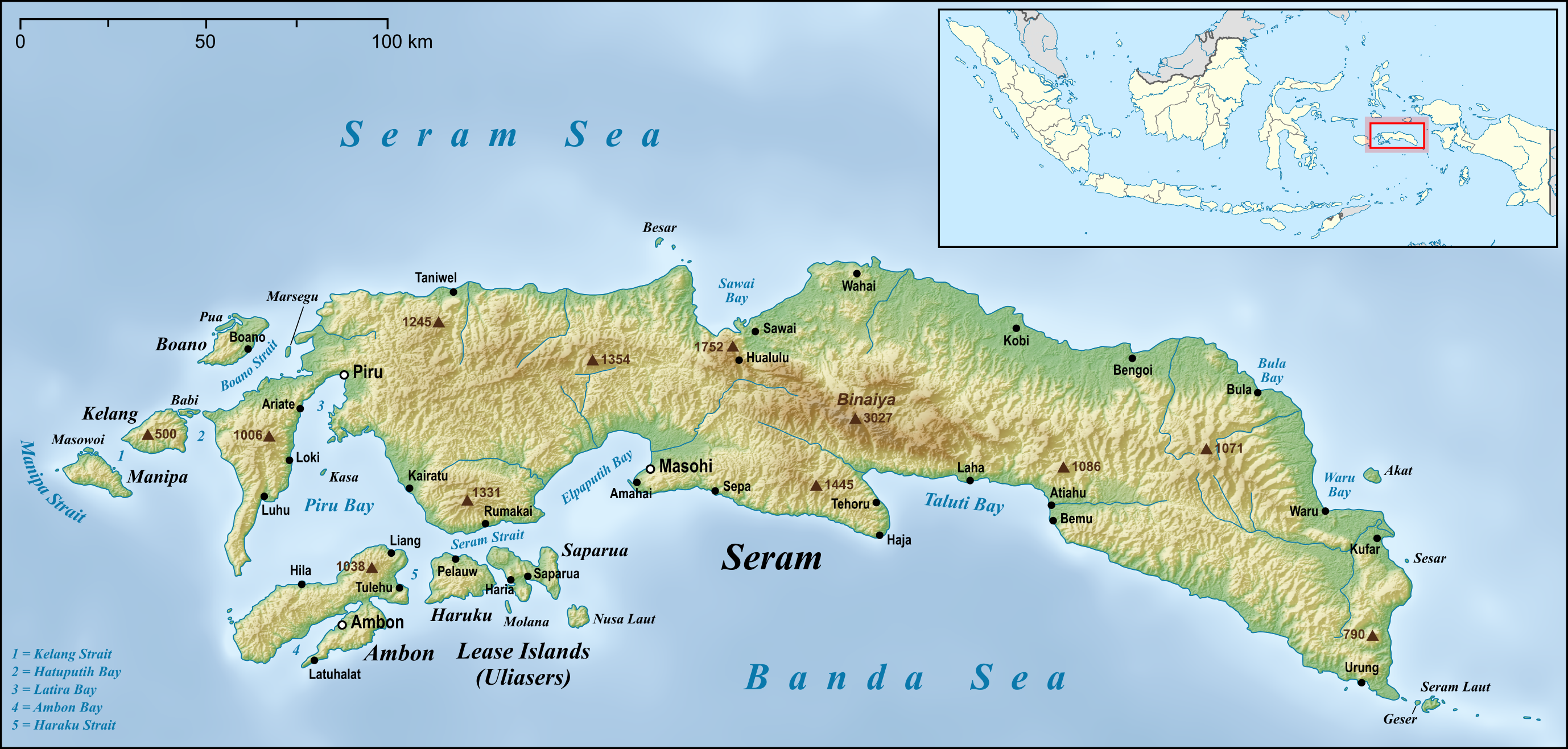
- Seram Island

- Location within Maluku

Geography
- Location: Oceania
- Coordinates: 3°08′S 129°30′E
- Archipelago: Maluku Islands
- Area: 17,100 km^{2} (6,600 sq mi)
- Area rank: 52nd
- Highest elevation: 3,027 m (9931 ft)
- Highest point: Mount Binaiya

Administration
- Indonesia
- Province: Maluku
- Regencies: Central Maluku, East Seram, West Seram

Demographics
- Population: 562,200 (2021)
- Pop. density: 32.9/km^{2} (85.2/sq mi)
- Ethnic groups: Manusela, Nuaulu, Alune, Wemale, Ambonese

Additional information
- Time zone: IEST (UTC+09:00)

Seram (formerly spelled Ceram; also Seran or Serang) is the largest and main island of Maluku province of Indonesia, despite Ambon Island's historical importance. It is located just north of the smaller Ambon Island and a few other adjacent islands, such as Saparua, Haruku, Nusa Laut and the Banda Islands.

== Geography and geology ==
Seram is traversed by a central mountain range, the highest point of which, Mount Binaiya, is covered with dense rain forests. Its remarkably complex geology is because of its location at the meeting of several tectonic microplates, which have been described as "one of the most tectonically complex areas on Earth". Seram falls on its microplate, which has been twisted around by 80° in the last 8 million years by the relatively faster movement of the Papua microplate. Meanwhile, along with the northward push of the Australian Plate, this has resulted in the uplift that gives north-central Seram peaks of over 3000 m. On the island, there are important karst areas. In the mountains, near Sawai, there is the cave Hatu Saka, currently the deepest cave in Indonesia (-388 m). In Taniwel district, on the north coast, is the underground river Sapalewa, one of the largest underground rivers on the planet.

The population of the island and the neighbouring smaller islands in the 2020 Census was 773,459 people, administered among three regencies (kabupaten), namely Maluku Tengah Regency (which had 204,907 people on Seram Island itself and 218,185 on the lesser islands, the majority on Ambon Island), Seram Bagian Barat Regency and Seram Bagian Timur Regency.

== Ecology ==
Seram Island is remarkable for its high degree of localised bird endemism. There are 117 species of birds on the island; 14 species and subspecies are endemic, including the eclectus, great-billed and Moluccan king parrot, purple-naped and red lories, salmon-crested cockatoo, Seram masked owl, collared, sacred and lazuli kingfishers, long-crested myna, elegant imperial-pigeon, Seram oriole, metallic starlings and grey-necked and Seram friarbirds.

The mammals found on Seram include Asian murid rodents as well as Australasian marsupials, including the common spotted cuscus and several species of Phalanger. The mountain area of Seram supports the greatest number of endemic mammals of any island in the region. It harbors 38 mammal species and includes nine species that are endemic or near-endemic, several of which are limited to montane habitats. These include the Seram bandicoot, several bat species including Moluccan and Seram flying foxes, Manusela mosaic-tailed rat, spiny Ceram rat and the Ceram rat, all considered threatened.

Herptiles are highly prevalent on the island. The largest and most dangerous to humans is the saltwater crocodile, found within the island's coastal brackish waters and deltas; some are known to swim inland via freshwater routes, such as the Salawai River. Other reptiles of the island include Amboina sailfin lizards, Bronchocela sp., the brown tree snake, emerald tree skinks, green sea turtles, Indonesian blue-tongued skinks, Moluccan flying snakes and the tokay gecko, among numerous other species of gecko and skink. Amphibians include Fejervarya, fork-tongued frogs and Horst's and white-lipped tree frogs.

In the eastern part of the island, Manusela National Park was established in 1997, covering an area of 1,890 km^{2} (11% of the island).

== History ==
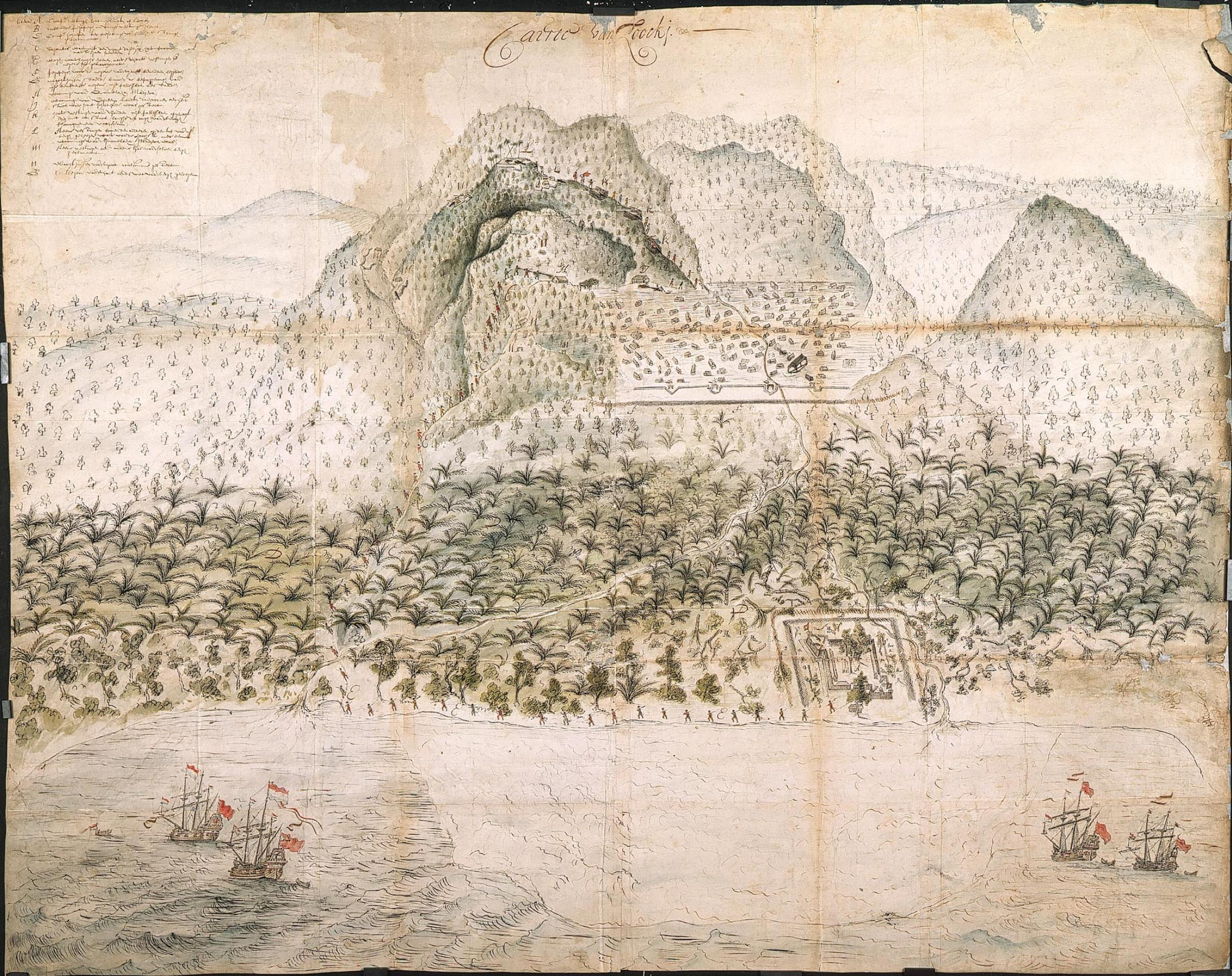
Dutch fort at Loki and Company troops in the interior, c. 1652

Most central Moluccans consider Seram to be their original ancestral home and it is still known colloquially as Nusa Ina (Mother Island). In the fifteenth and sixteenth centuries, Seram was generally within the sphere of influence of Ternate, although it was often ruled more directly by the Ternaten vassal state of Buru. The expedition of António de Abreu (as captain) and Francisco Serrão sighted and explored the entire southern coast of Seram in early 1512, for the first time for Europeans. Portuguese missionaries were active there in the 16th century. Dutch trading posts were opened in the early 17th century, and the island came under nominal Dutch control c. 1650. The Tidore Sultanate made periodical claims on Seram and were accorded suzerainty in the eastern part of the island from 1700 to 1768. In the 1780s, Seram provided a key base of support for Prince Nuku of Tidore's long-running rebellion against Dutch rule. From 1954 until 1962 the island's mountain terrain was the scene of an armed guerilla struggle against Indonesian rule by the counter revolutionary Republic of South Maluku movement led by Chris Soumokil.

== Administration ==
Seram includes three of the regencies within the province of Maluku, but administratively each of these regencies includes a number of smaller islands adjacent to Seram.

1. West Seram Regency (Kabupaten Seram Bagian Barat) is mainly located on the island of Seram, but includes various islands lying to the west of Seram – Manipa, Kelang, Boano and the smaller Babi, Pua and Marsegu. It covers a land area of 6,948.40 km^{2}, and had a population of 164,654 at the 2010 Census and 212,393 at the 2020 Census; the estimated total in mid 2023 was 214,979. The principal town lies at Piru.
2. Central Maluku Regency (Kabupaten Maluku Tengah), with its capital at Masohi, includes the middle part of Seram, as well as much of Ambon Island (apart from the City of Ambon which forms the southern half of that island), the Lease Islands (Saparua, Haruku, Nusa Laut) and some other smaller offshore islands, plus the Banda Islands further to the south. It covers 11,595.57 km^{2} and had a population of 423,094 at the 2020 Census; this excludes the City of Ambon, which occupies the southern half of Ambon Island but is administratively not part of the regency. The portion of the regency on Seram Island itself covers 10,680.55 km^{2}, and had an estimated 213,694 inhabitants in mid 2023.
3. East Seram Regency (Kabupaten Seram Bagian Timur) is mainly located on the island of Seram, but also includes smaller islands to the southeast comprising the Gorom and Watubela archipelagoes. The regency covers a land area of 5,779.12 km^{2}, and had a population of 99,065 at the 2010 Census and 137,972 at the 2020 Census. The principal town lies at Bula. Excluding the Gorom and Watubela archipelagoes, the 'mainland' of East Seram covered 5,577 km^{2} and had a population of 92,500 in mid 2023.

== Religion ==
Religion in Seram Island (2023)
1. Islam (68.7%)
2. Protestantism (30.0%)
3. Roman Catholic (0.80%)
4. Hinduism (0.36%)
5. Confucianism (0.15%)
6. Buddhism (0.02%)
7. Folk/Others (0.01%)

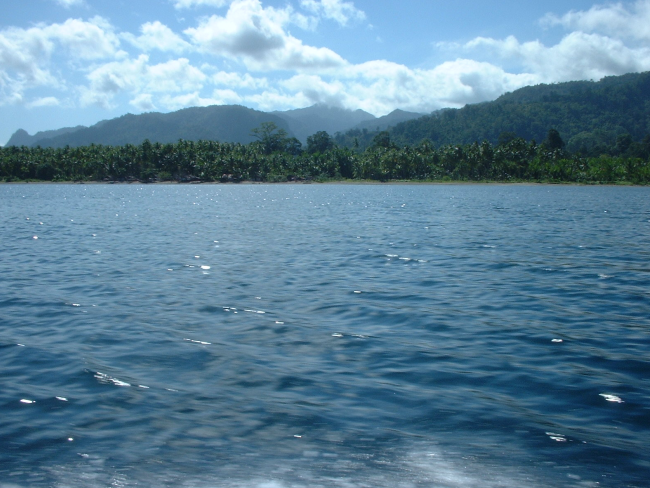
View from a boat towards Tulehu, on the North Seram coast

Seram has been traditionally associated with the animism of the indigenous Alfur (or Nuaulu), a West Melanesian people who reputedly retained a custom of headhunting until the 1940s. Today, however, most of the population of Seram is either Muslim or Christian due to both conversion and immigration. Seram was affected by the violent inter-religious conflict that swept Maluku province starting in late 1998, resulting in tens of thousands of displaced persons across the province but after the Malino II Accord of 2002 tempers cooled. Seram has been peaceful for many years but towns like Masohi remain informally divided into de facto Christian and Muslim sections. Around 7,000 people belonging to the Manusela tribe follow Hinduism.

== Economy ==
Copra, resin, sago, and fish are important products. Oil is produced in the northeast near Bula by CITIC Seram Energy who took over from KUFPEC (Indonesia) Limited in 2006. The Oseil oil field is located onshore in the northeast of the island in the Seram Non-Bula Production Sharing Contract area. The discovery well was drilled in 1993. As of end 2010 the Seram Non-Bula Block had estimated proven oil reserves of 9.7 million barrels. Most production comes from the Jurassic Manusela carbonate formation.

== See also ==
- 1899 Ceram earthquake
- Niwelehu: village in Taniwel
- List of islands of Indonesia
