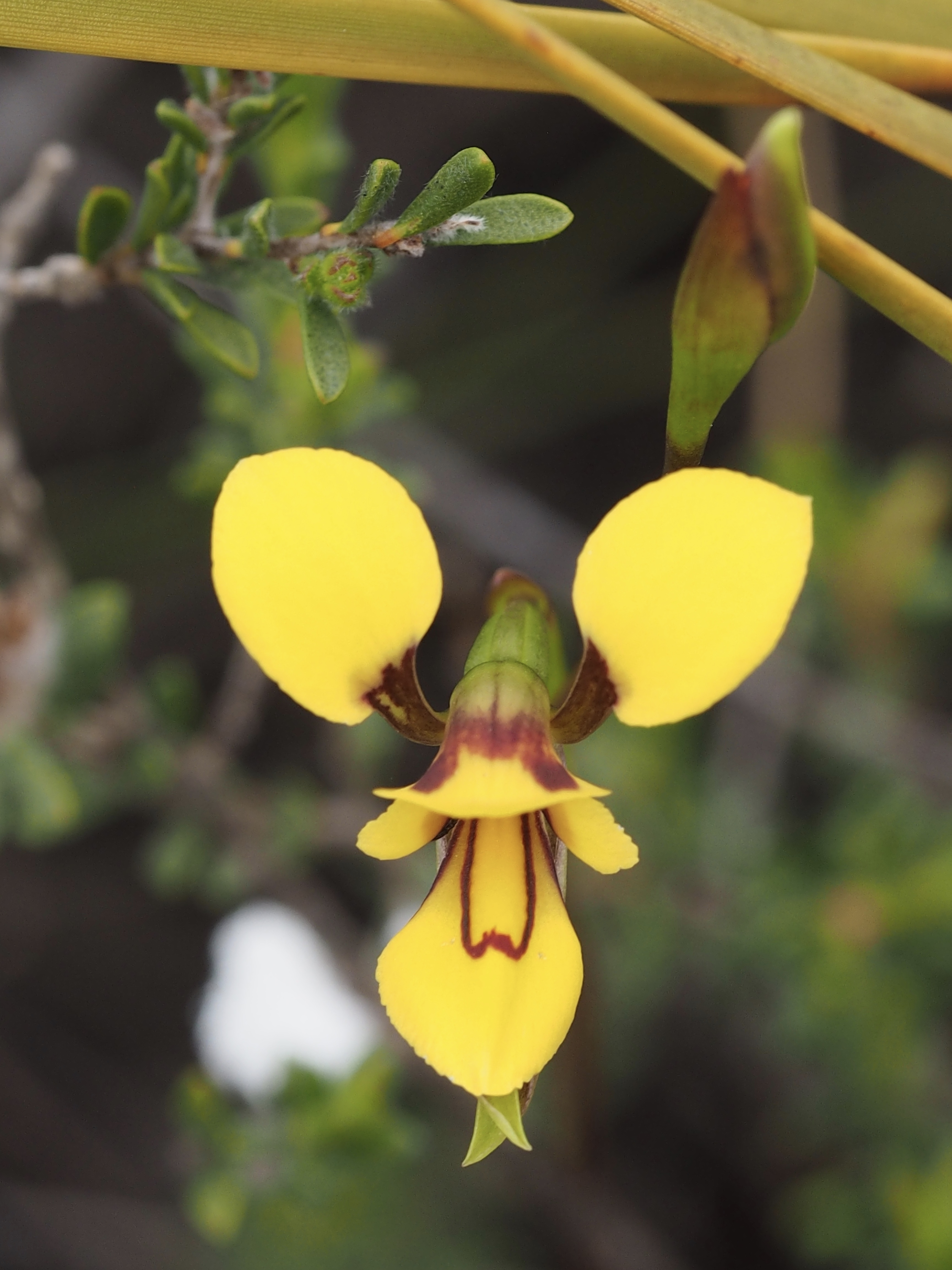
- Diuris concinna growing in Dunns Swamp, near Hopetoun

Scientific classification
- Kingdom: Plantae
- Clade: Tracheophytes
- Clade: Angiosperms
- Clade: Monocots
- Order: Asparagales
- Family: Orchidaceae
- Subfamily: Orchidoideae
- Tribe: Diurideae
- Genus: Diuris
- Species: D. concinna

Binomial name
- Diuris concinna D.L.Jones

= Diuris concinna =

Elegant donkey orchid

Species of orchid

Diuris concinna, commonly called the elegant donkey orchid, is a species of orchid which is endemic to the south-west of Western Australia. It has up to five linear leaves at its base and up to five pale yellow flowers with brown markings. It is found along the south coast, often growing in areas that are flooded in winter and flowering more prolifically after fire the previous summer.

== Description ==
Diuris concinna is a tuberous, perennial herb, usually growing to a height of 200–400 mm (8–20 in), although often up to 600 mm (20 in) when surrounded by sedges. Between three and five linear leaves emerge at the base, each leaf 80–150 mm (3–6 in) long and 10–20 mm (0.4–0.8 in) wide. Up to five pale yellow flowers with brown markings, 25 mm (1 in) wide are borne on a flowering stem 200–400 mm (8–20 in) tall. The dorsal sepal is more or less erect, egg-shaped, 8–14 mm (0.3–0.6 in) long and 5–8.5 mm (0.2–0.3 in) wide. The lateral sepals are linear to sword-shaped, green and purplish, 10–17 mm (0.4–0.7 in) long, about 3 mm (0.1 in) wide, turned downwards and parallel to each other. The petals are curved backwards, spread apart from each other, sometimes almost horizontal, with an elliptic blade 9–13 mm (0.4–0.5 in) long and 5–8 mm (0.2–0.3 in) wide on a reddish-brown stalk 3–6 mm (0.1–0.2 in) long. The labellum is 10–14 mm (0.4–0.6 in) long and has three lobes. The centre lobe is egg-shaped, 6–8 mm (0.2–0.3 in) long, 8–11 mm (0.3–0.4 in) wide and the side lobes are egg-shaped, 4–7 mm (0.2–0.3 in) long and 2–3.5 mm (0.08–0.1 in) wide. There are two ridge-like calli 5–6 mm (0.20–0.24 in) long near the mid-line of the base of the labellum. Flowering occurs between September and December, reaching a peak in mid-October.

== Taxonomy and naming ==
Diuris concinna was first formally described in 1991 by David Jones from a specimen collected near Esperance, and the description was published in Australian Orchid Review. The specific epithet (concinna) is a Latin word meaning "well-arranged, skilfully joined, beautiful [or] striking".

== Distribution and habitat ==
The elegant donkey orchid grows in winter-wet areas, usually between low shrubs or sedges between the Cape Arid and Fitzgerald River National Parks in the Coolgardie, Esperance Plains and Mallee biogeographic regions.

== Conservation ==
Diuris concinna is classified as "not threatened" by the Western Australian Government Department of Parks and Wildlife.
