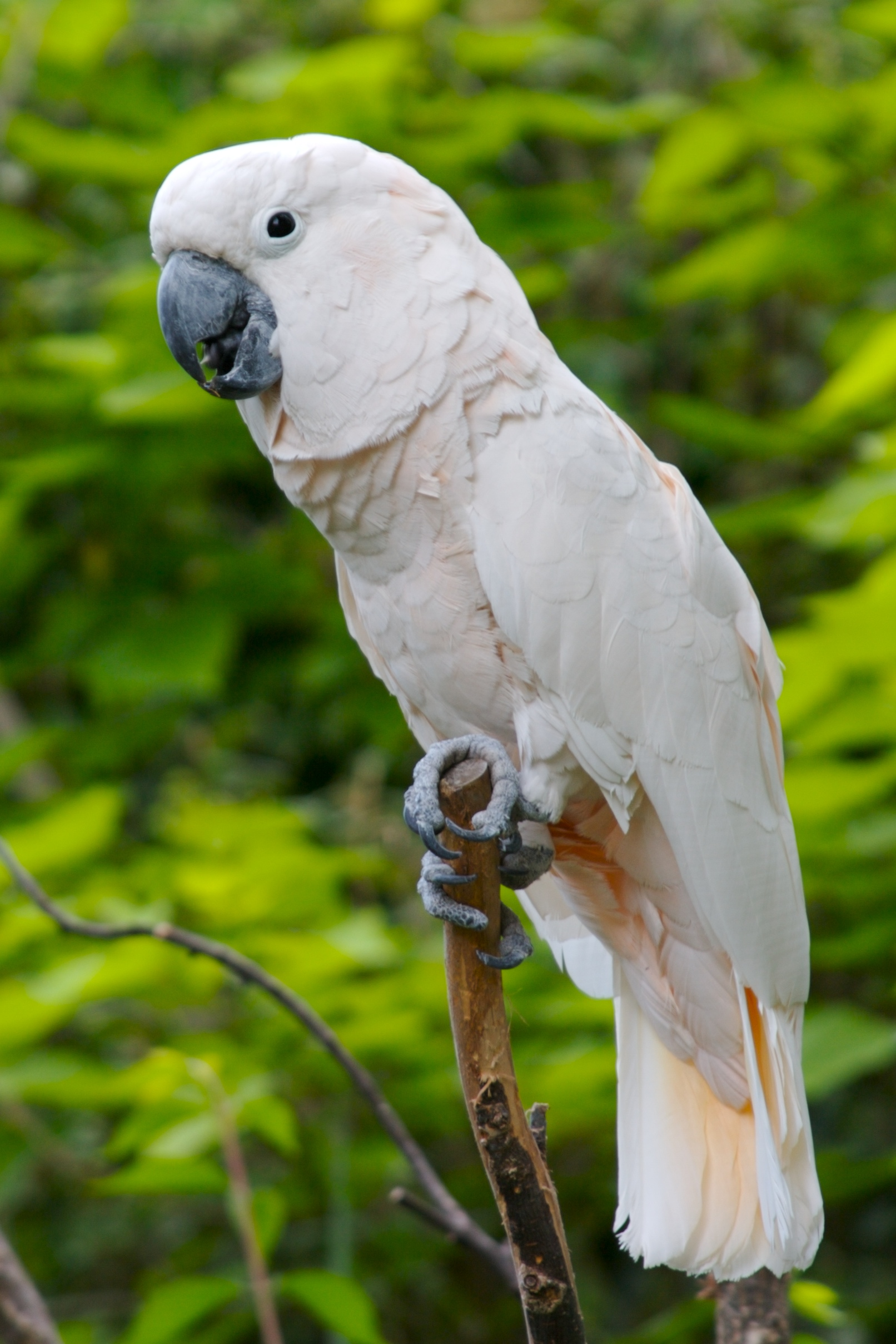
- At Cincinnati Zoo

Conservation status
- Endangered (IUCN 3.1)
- CITES Appendix I

Scientific classification
- Kingdom: Animalia
- Phylum: Chordata
- Class: Aves
- Order: Psittaciformes
- Family: Cacatuidae
- Genus: Cacatua
- Subgenus: Cacatua
- Species: C. moluccensis

Binomial name
- Cacatua moluccensis (Gmelin, JF, 1788)

= Salmon-crested cockatoo =

Species of bird

The salmon-crested cockatoo (Cacatua moluccensis), also known as the Moluccan cockatoo, is a cockatoo endemic to the Seram archipelago in eastern Indonesia. At a height of up to 46–52 cm (1.51–1.71 ft) and weight of up to 850 g (1.87 lb), it is among the largest of the white cockatoos. The female is slightly smaller than the male on average. It has white-pink feathers with a definite peachy glow, a slight yellow on the underwing and underside of the tail feathers and a large retractable recumbent crest, which it raises when threatened, revealing hitherto concealed bright red-orange plumes to frighten potential attackers. It may also be raised in excitement or in other "emotional" displays. Some describe the crest as "flamingo-colored". It also has one of the louder calls in the parrot world and in captivity is a capable mimic.

In the wild, the salmon-crested cockatoo inhabits lowland forests below 1,000 metres or 3,300 feet. Its diet consists mainly of seeds, nuts, and fruit, as well as coconuts. Some additional evidence shows that they eat insects off the ground, and pet Moluccan cockatoos have tested positive for anemia if their diets do not include enough protein.

== Taxonomy ==
The salmon-crested cockatoo was formally described in 1788 by German naturalist Johann Friedrich Gmelin in his revised and expanded edition of Carl Linnaeus's Systema Naturae. He placed it with parrots in the genus Psittacus and coined the binomial name Psittacus moluccensis. Gmelin based his description on those by earlier ornithologists. George Edwards had described and illustrated the cockatoo in 1751, Mathurin Jacques Brisson had described it in 1760, and the Comte de Buffon in had described and illustrated the cockatoo in 1779. The type locality is the Maluku Islands. The salmon-crested cockatoo is now one of 11 species placed in the genus Cacatua that was introduced in 1817 by Louis Pierre Vieillot. The species is monotypic; no subspecies are recognised.

== Distribution and habitat ==
The salmon-crested cockatoo is endemic to the Seram archipelago in eastern Indonesia, and has been introduced to the Hawai'ian island of Oahu, where a small population has become established. Although they have been observed in the wild in Puerto Rico, they are probably the result of escaped pets, and no reproduction has been recorded.

== Status in the wild ==
The salmon-crested cockatoo is an endangered species, and has been listed on appendix I of CITES since 1989, which makes commercial international trade in wild-caught birds prohibited. Trade in captive-bred birds is legal only with appropriate CITES certification. Numbers have declined due to illegal trapping for the cage-bird trade and habitat loss. During the height of the trapping of this species, over 6,000 birds were being removed from the wild per year. It has a stronghold in Manusela National Park on Seram, although even today some illegal trapping continues.

As of 2024, there are an estimated 20,000 – 60,000 mature individuals remaining in the wild, though its population is expected to be rapidly decreasing due to continuing trapping for the pet trade and habitat destruction.

== Aviculture ==
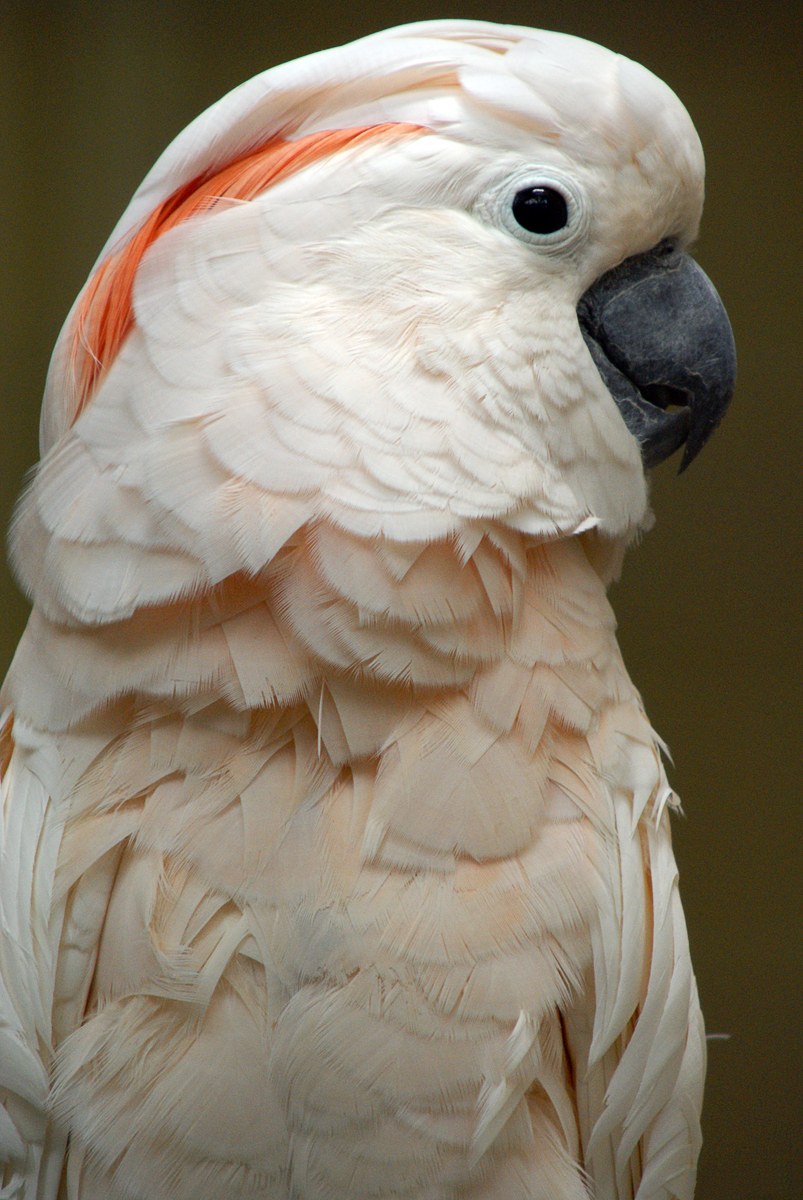
At Kuala Lumpur Bird Park

The salmon-crested cockatoo is widely considered to be one of the most demanding parrots to keep as a pet due to their high intelligence, large size, potential noise level (some of the loudest birds in the world, with calls up to 129 decibels), and need to chew. They require a very large and very sturdy cage or aviary. Salmon-crested cockatoos are highly social, and pets can be extremely cuddly, affectionate, and gentle birds. This can lead to problems if a young cockatoo is spoiled with a great deal of attention and cuddling when young and does not get the opportunity to learn to play with toys, forage, or otherwise entertain itself.

Salmon-crested cockatoos require a great deal of attention and activity to remain healthy and well-adjusted. Attention and training from human caregivers is important in keeping them occupied, as are chewable toys and foraging toys that require them to work for their food. As with most large cockatoos, the salmon-crested cockatoo may develop health and behavioural problems such as feather-plucking and aggression if not provided with the appropriate environment, attention, and enrichment opportunities.

In captivity, the salmon-crested cockatoo has been known to live for an extremely long time, with a captive individual mentioned in a 2011 paper having lived to the age of 92 years.

== Breeding ==
Moluccan cockatoos breed once a year, usually between December and March, when vegetation growth is at its peak and food is readily available.

== Gallery ==
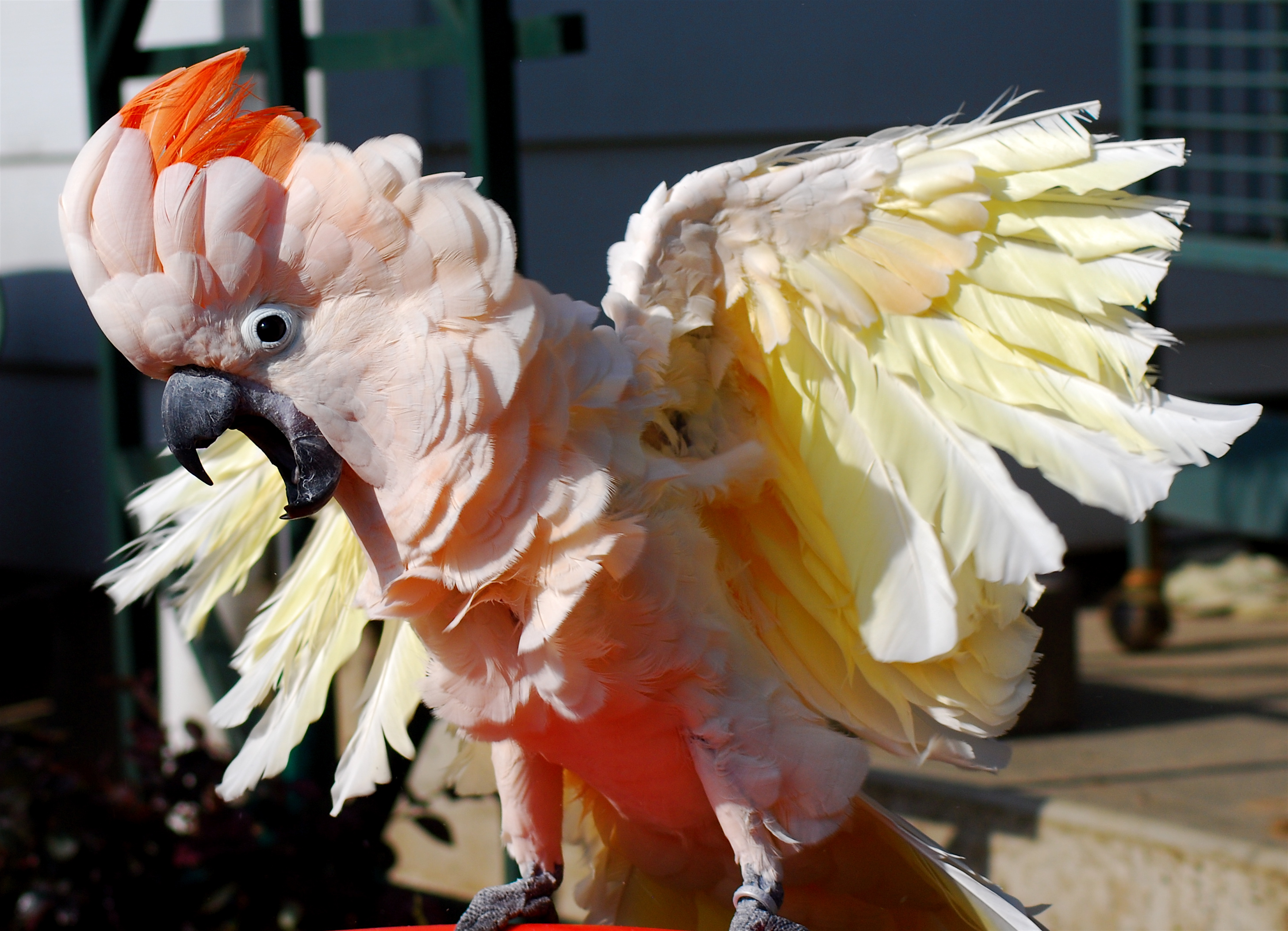
Salmon-crested cockatoo displaying (wings clipped)

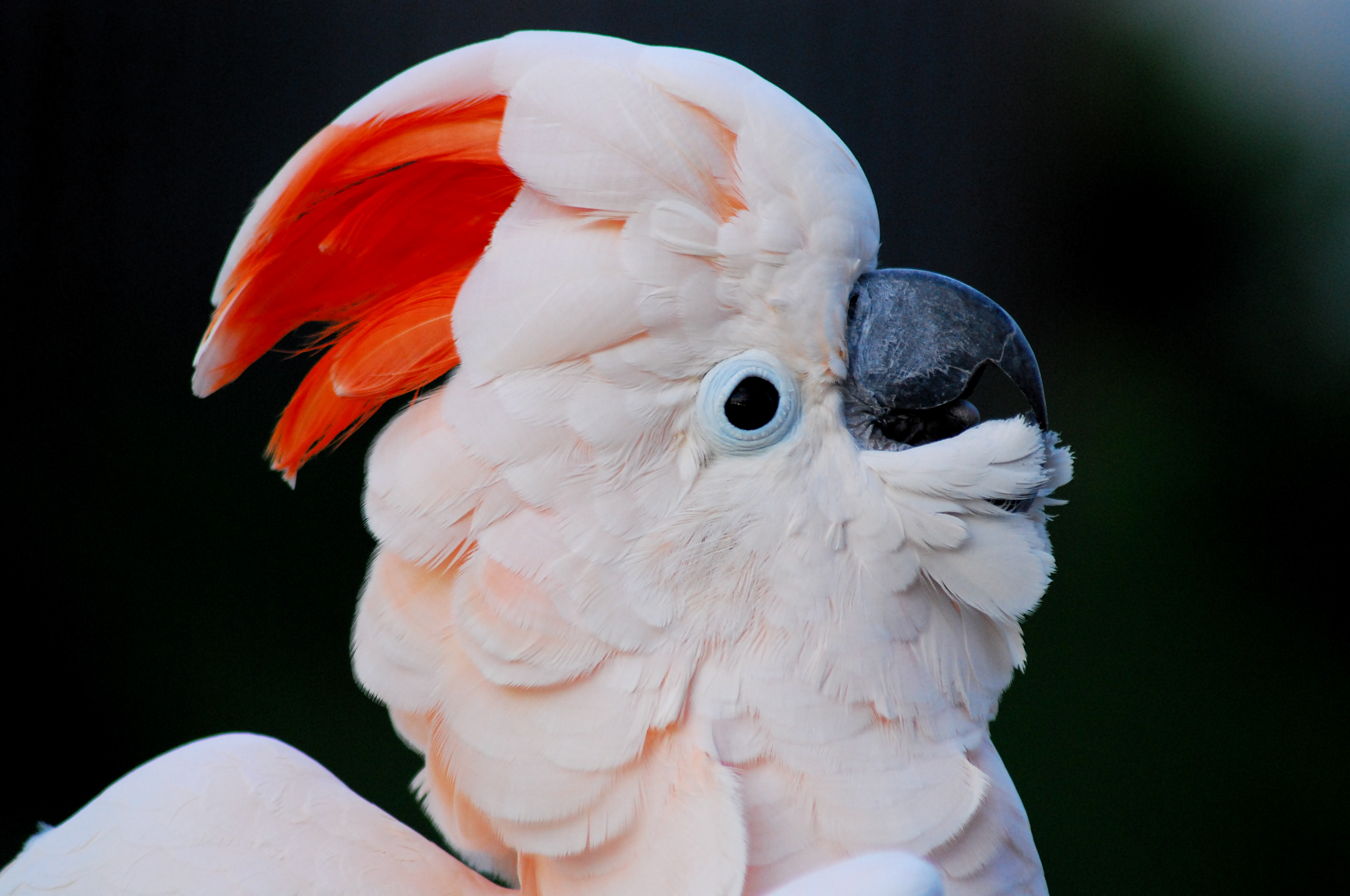
Closeup of head and crest

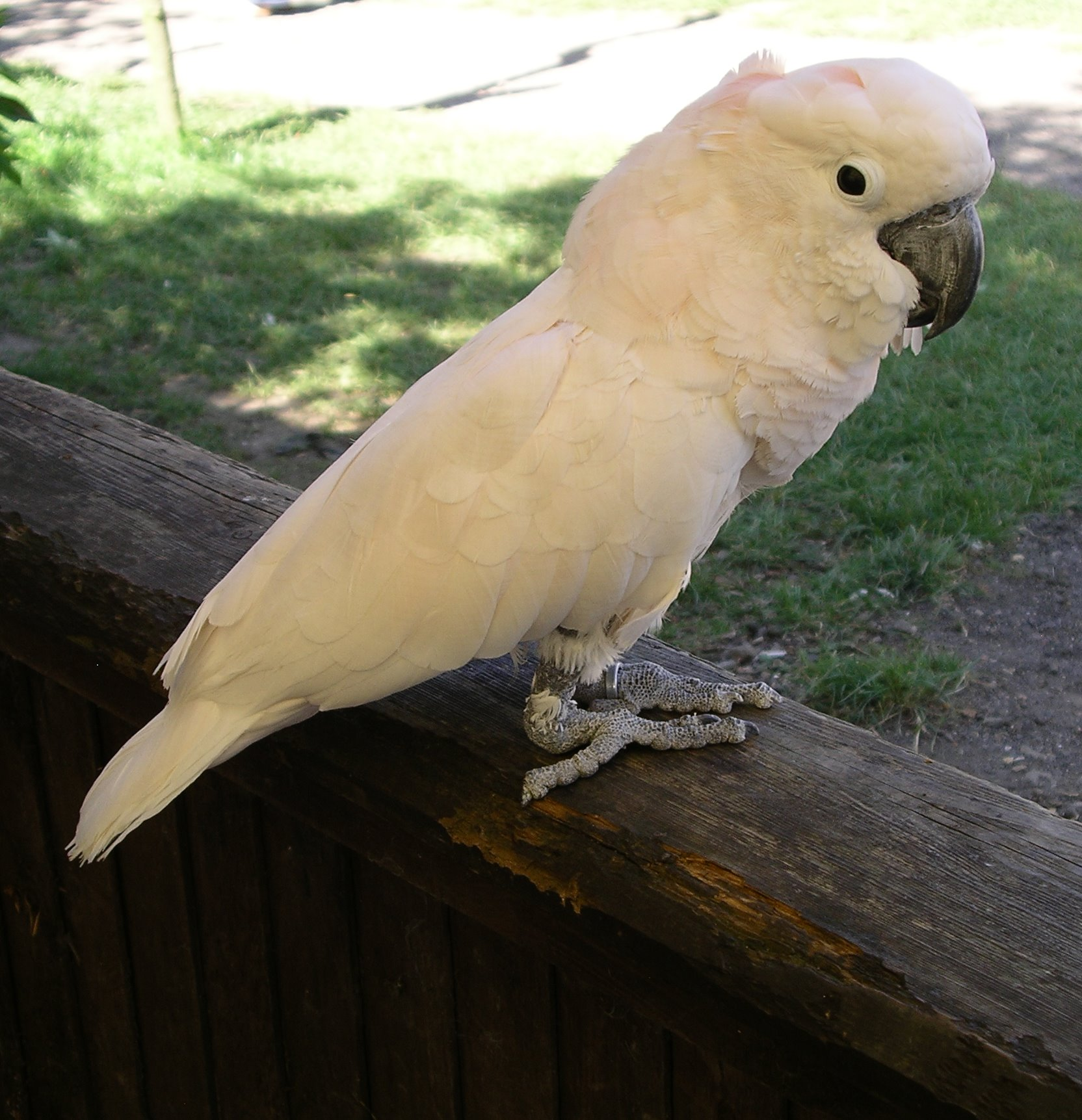
In Tropical Birdland, Leicestershire, England

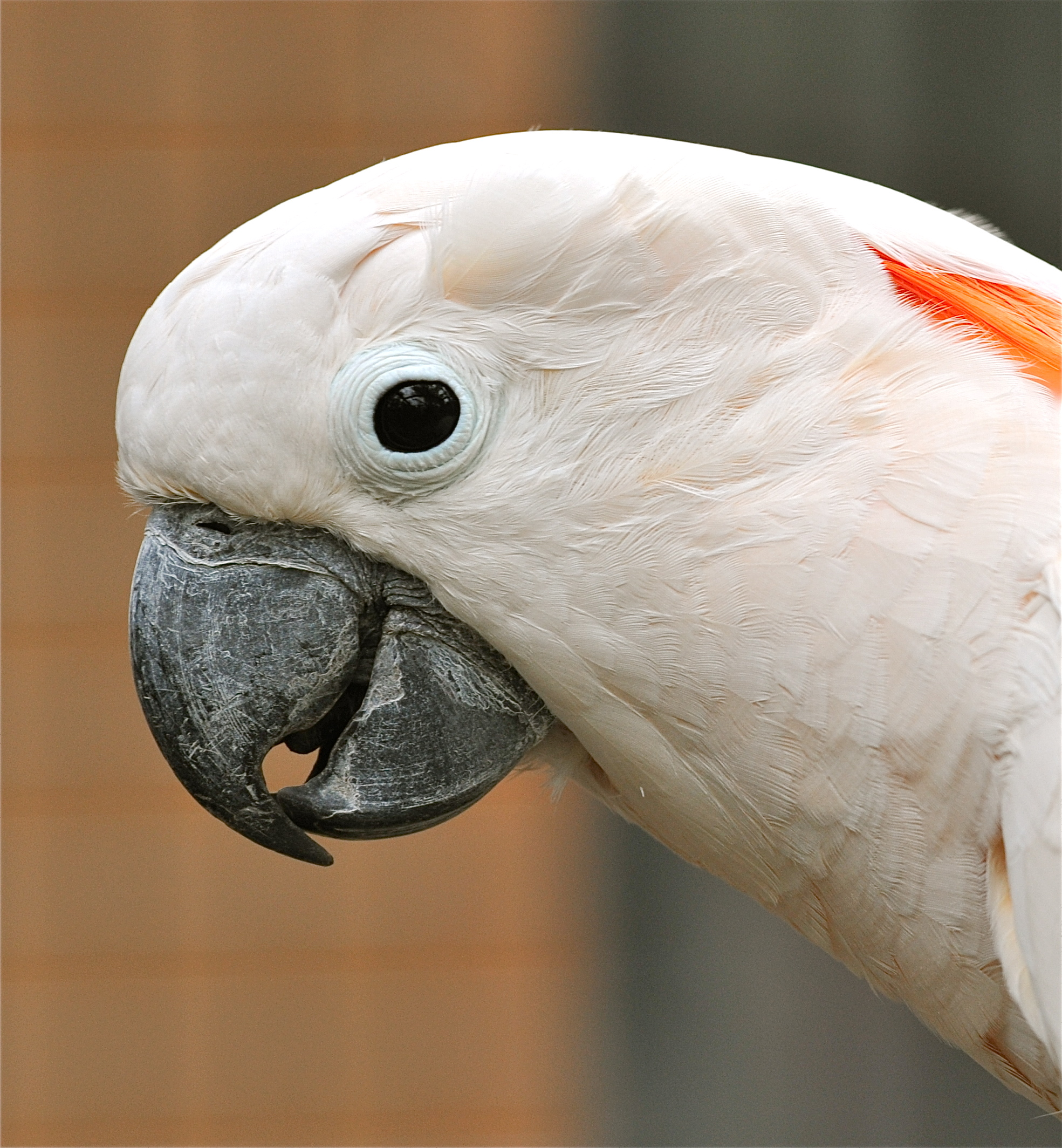

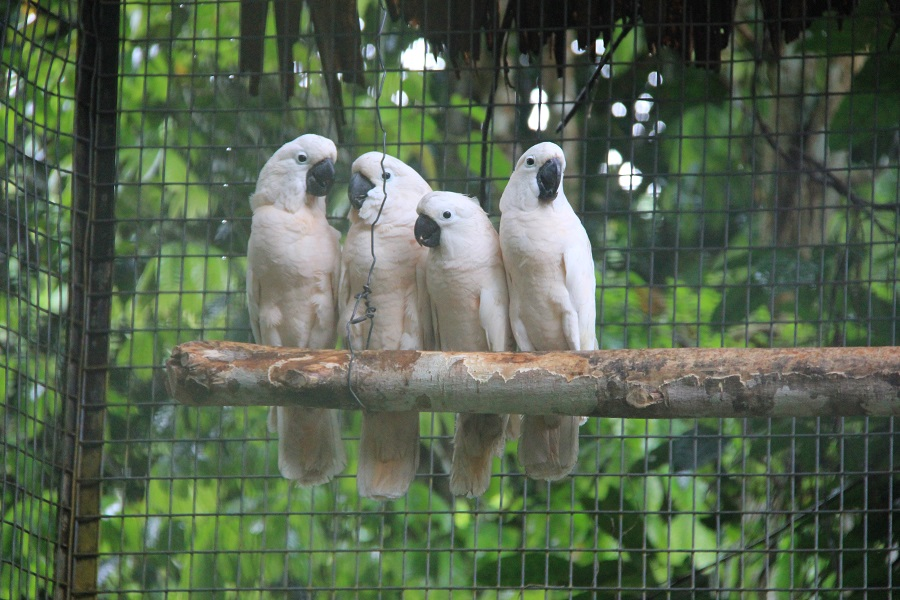
In Sawai, Seram Island

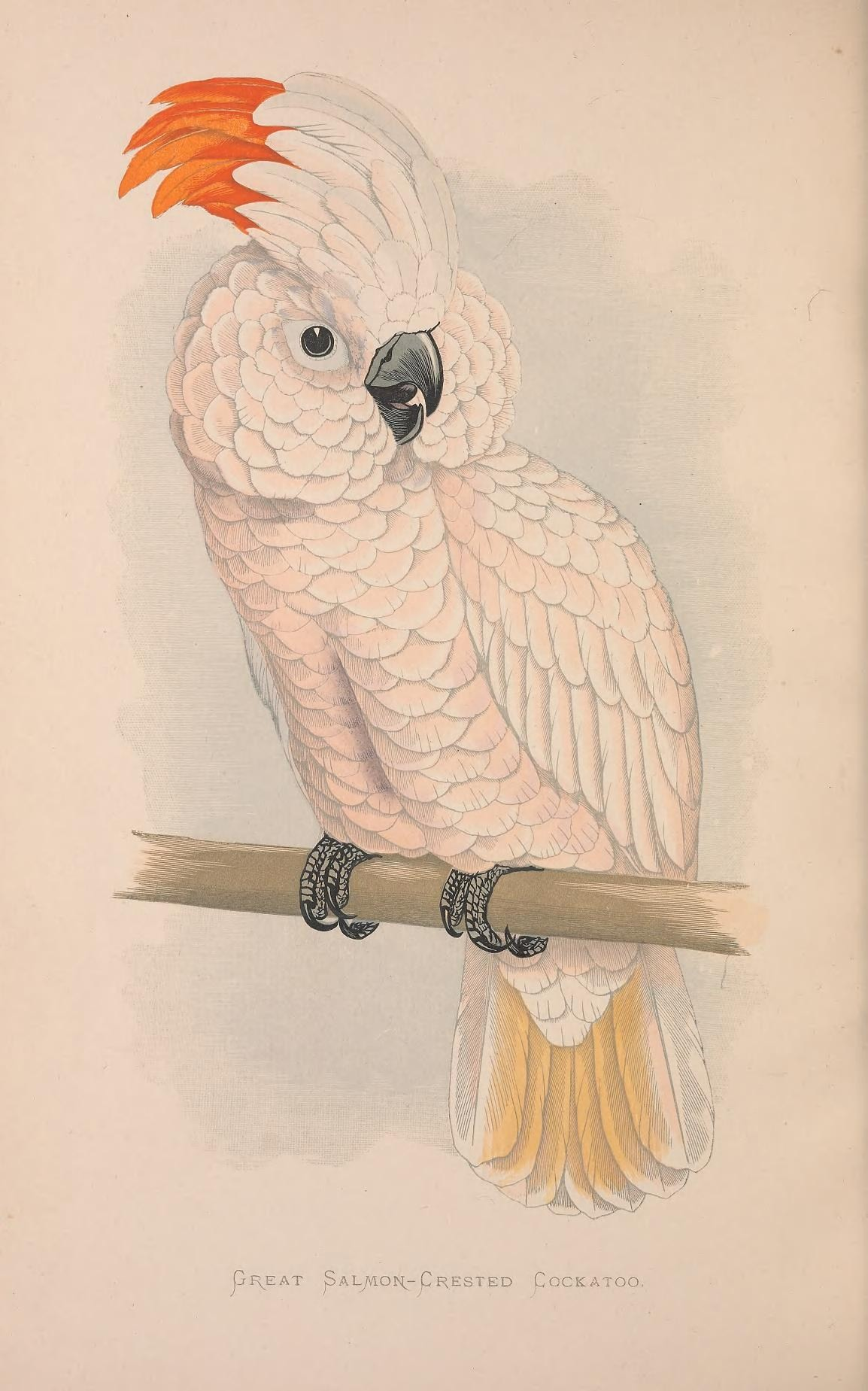
Illustration
