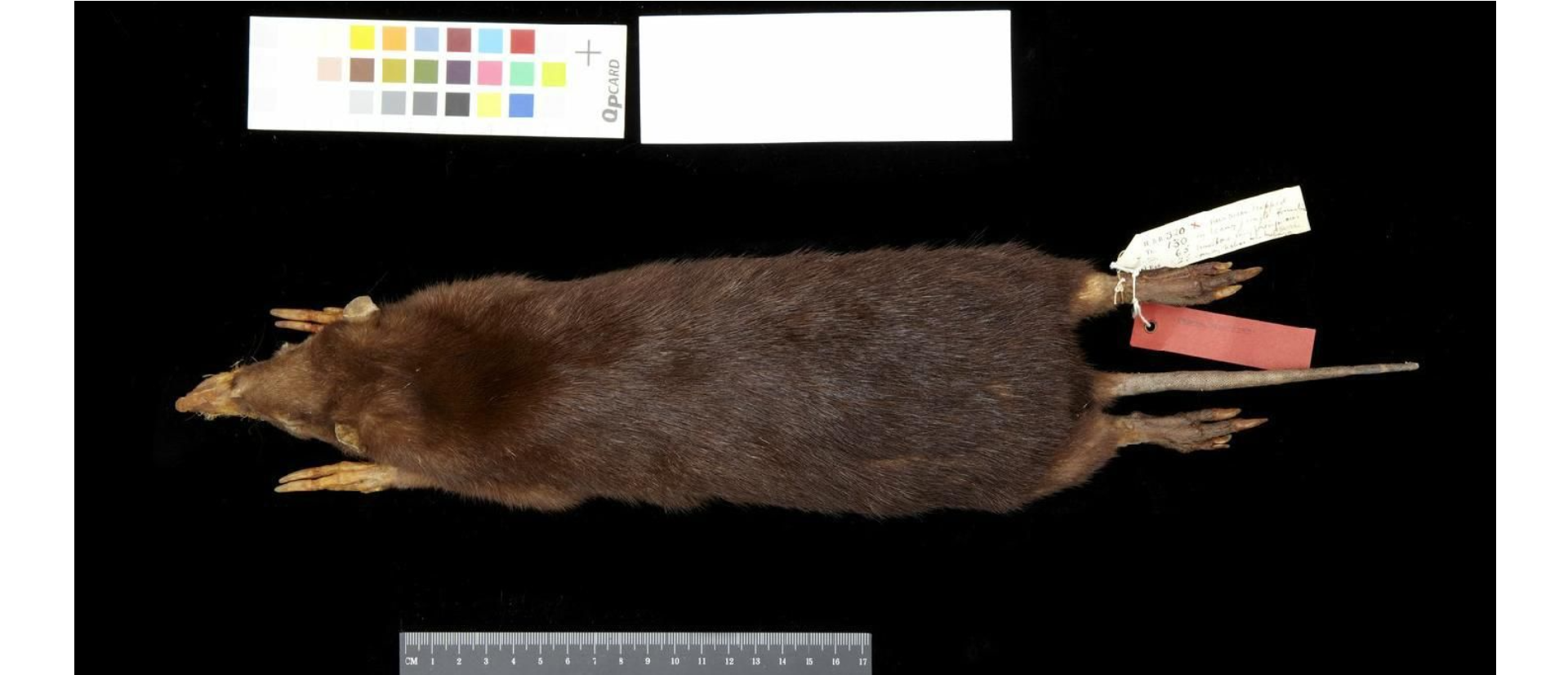

Conservation status
- Endangered (IUCN 3.1)

Scientific classification
- Kingdom: Animalia
- Phylum: Chordata
- Class: Mammalia
- Infraclass: Marsupialia
- Order: Peramelemorphia
- Family: Peramelidae
- Subfamily: Echymiperinae
- Genus: Rhynchomeles; Thomas, 1920
- Species: R. prattorum

Binomial name
- Rhynchomeles prattorum Thomas, 1920
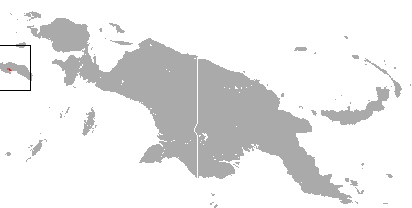
- Seram bandicoot range

= Seram bandicoot =

Species of marsupial

The Seram bandicoot (Rhynchomeles prattorum), also known as the Seram Island long-nosed bandicoot, is a member of the order Peramelemorphia that is endemic to the island of Seram in Indonesia. It is the only species in the genus Rhynchomeles.

== Description ==
It was named by Oldfield Thomas for Charles, Felix and Joseph Pratt, the three brothers who collected the specimens. The species was described from seven specimens collected in 1920 on the island of Seram in the Moluccas, these type specimens are the only record of its existence. It is classified as an endangered species on the Red List of the IUCN, due to its narrow distribution range and noted as data deficient. The survival of the species, if extant, is threatened by clearing of lower altitude forests near its type locality. The introduction of pigs, dogs, and other feral animals could cause a decline in population. The collection of the type specimens was made in tropical upper montane forest, in Manusela National Park, with one specimen obtained at an altitude of 1,800 metres (5,900 ft) above sea level. The surrounding region has not been surveyed for this species, although an occurrence in Buru has been suggested.

== Vernacular names ==
Vernacular names for R. prattorum:

- Manusela language: mabaya
- Nuaulu language: imanona
