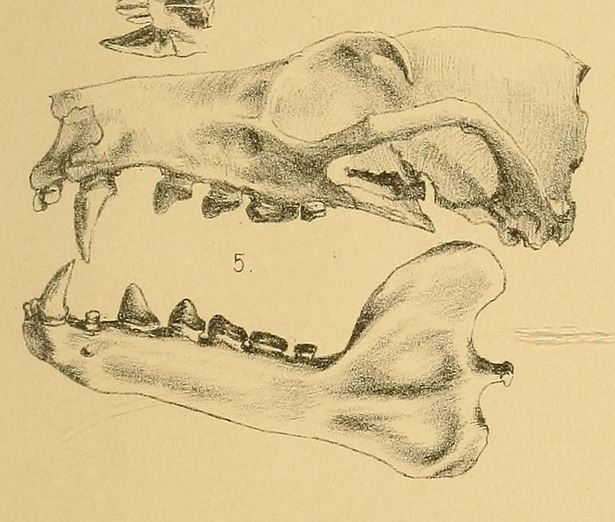

Conservation status
- Vulnerable (IUCN 3.1)

Scientific classification
- Kingdom: Animalia
- Phylum: Chordata
- Class: Mammalia
- Order: Chiroptera
- Family: Pteropodidae
- Genus: Pteropus
- Species: P. ocularis

Binomial name
- Pteropus ocularis Peters, 1867
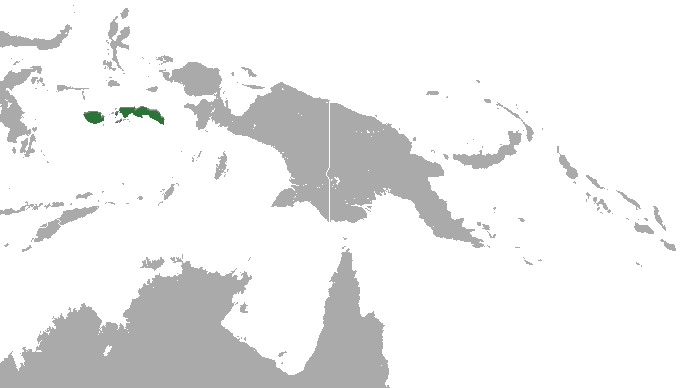
- Seram flying fox range

= Seram flying fox =

Species of bat

The Seram flying fox (Pteropus ocularis) is a species of flying fox in the family Pteropodidae. It is endemic to the mountainous forests of two of the Maluku Islands, Buru and Seram, including the Manusela National Park on Seram. They were once present on the nearby Ambon Island, but probably not anymore. The habitat has an area of less than 20,000 km^{2} (7,700 mi^{2}), and is decreasing due to logging. For this reason, and because of hunting by the local population, these species are listed as vulnerable by the IUCN since 1996.

== Taxonomy ==
The Seram flying fox was described as a new species in 1867 by German naturalist Wilhelm Peters. The holotype came from the collection of Alfred Russel Wallace and had been collected on Seram Island.

A 2020 genetic study that included nuclear and mitochondrial loci returned a maximum likelihood tree of flying foxes that had the ornate flying fox (Pteropus ornatus) as the sister taxon, or closest relative, of the Seram flying fox.

== Description ==
The Seram flying fox is similar in appearance to the spectacled flying fox (Pteropus conspicillatus) due to the ring-like pattern of reddish-brown fur around its eyes. It is much smaller, though. The forearm length ranges from 130–145 mm (5.1–5.7 in). It is an infrequently encountered species, but a subadult male and an adult female had weights of 400 g (14 oz) and 220 g (7.8 oz), respectively.

== Range and habitat ==
The Seram flying fox has a restricted range, and has only been documented on the Indonesian islands of Ambon, Buru, and Seram. Its range likely no longer includes Ambon Island. It has been documented at a range of elevations from 0–900 m (0–2,953 ft) above sea level in old-growth and mangrove forests.

== Conservation ==
As of 2016, it is listed as a vulnerable species by the IUCN. It meets the criteria for this designation due to a projected population decline of at least 30% over the next twenty-four years, primarily due to habitat destruction from deforestation. It additionally is hunted for bushmeat, though likely not as often as other flying foxes due to its rarity and solitary roosting behavior—colonial bats are more easily hunted.
