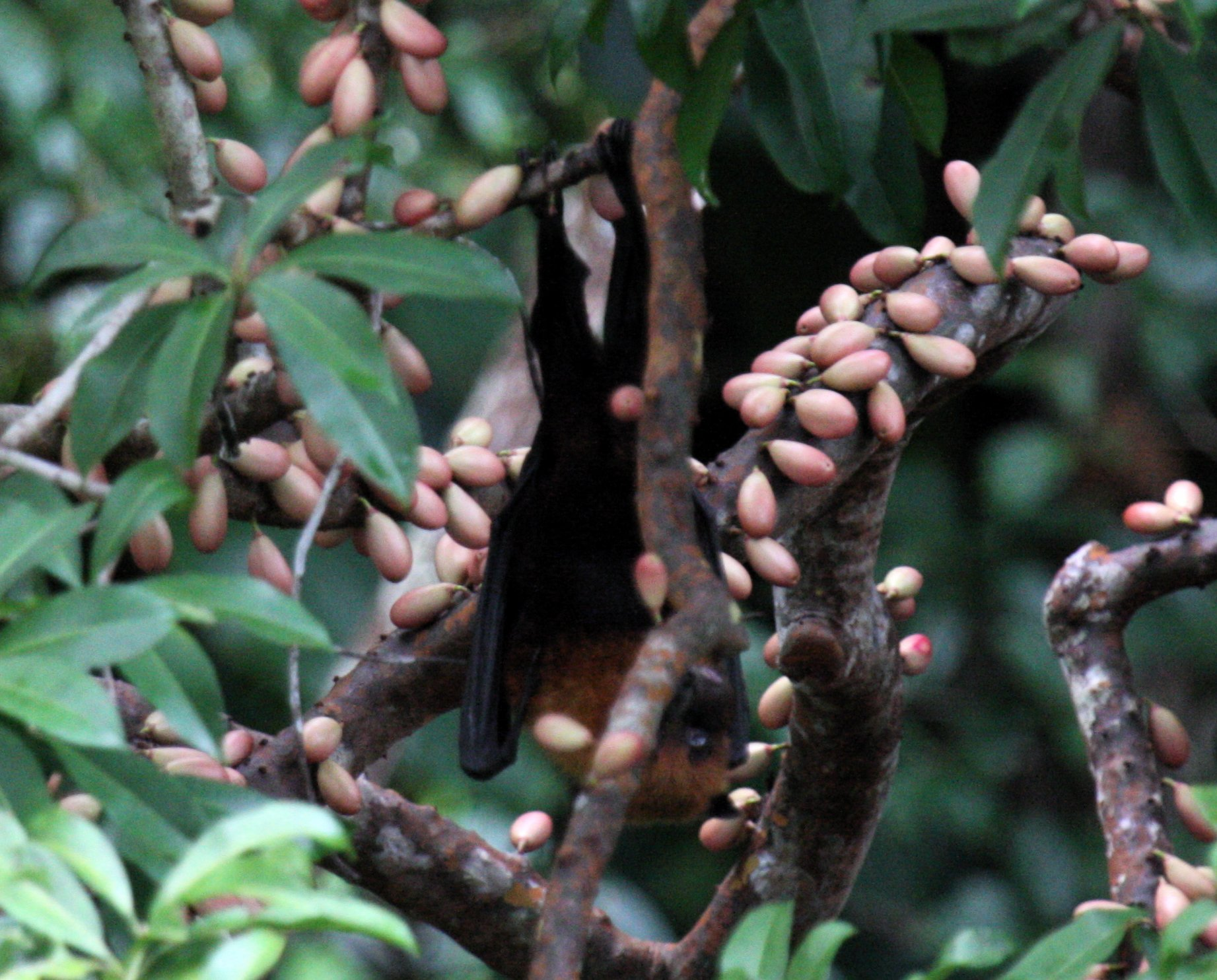

Conservation status
- Vulnerable (IUCN 3.1)

Scientific classification
- Kingdom: Animalia
- Phylum: Chordata
- Class: Mammalia
- Order: Chiroptera
- Family: Pteropodidae
- Genus: Pteropus
- Species: P. chrysoproctus

Binomial name
- Pteropus chrysoproctus Temminck, 1837
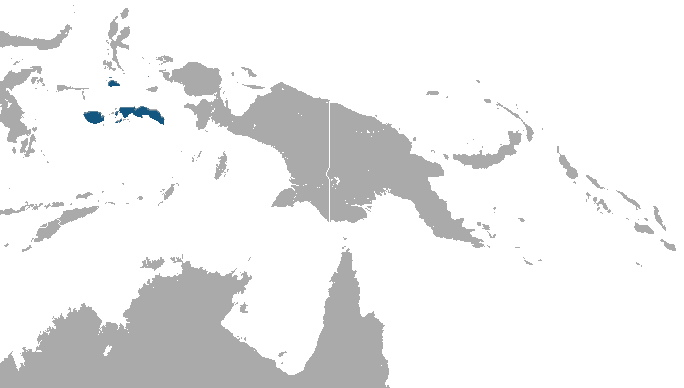
- Moluccan flying fox range

= Moluccan flying fox =

Species of bat

The Moluccan flying fox (Pteropus chrysoproctus), also known as the Ambon flying fox, is a species of megabat in the genus Pteropus.

It is found in the low-lying forests (less than 250 m above sea level) of Seram Island (including Manusela National Park), Buru, Ambon and the nearby Maluku Islands of eastern Indonesia.

Another Pteropus species, P. argentatus, was until recently considered to be the same species as P. chrysoproctus.

The habitat has an area of less than 20,000 km^{2} and is decreasing due to logging. For this reason, and because of hunting by the local population, these species have been listed as Vulnerable by the IUCN.
