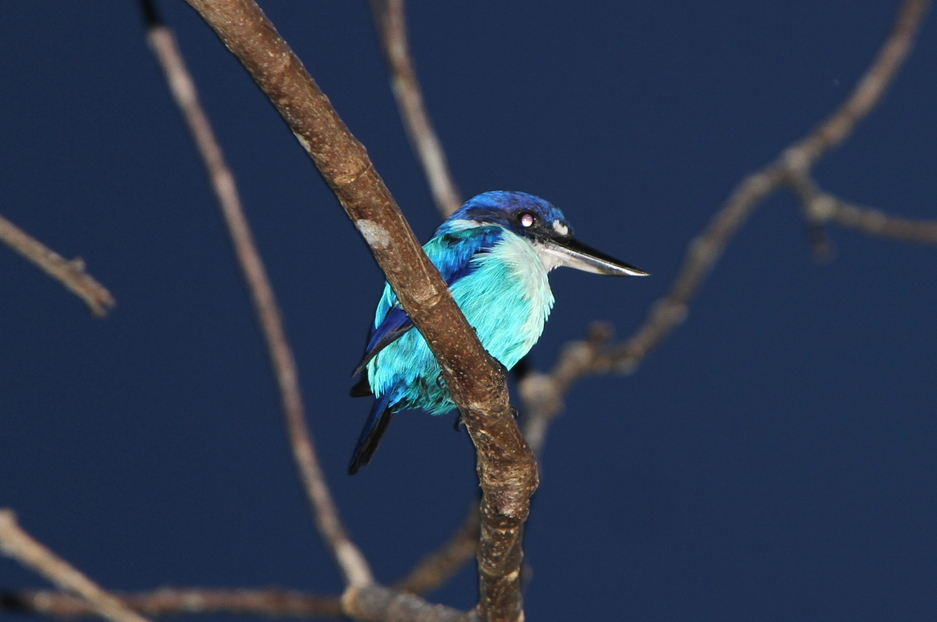

Conservation status
- Least Concern (IUCN 3.1)

Scientific classification
- Kingdom: Animalia
- Phylum: Chordata
- Class: Aves
- Order: Coraciiformes
- Family: Alcedinidae
- Subfamily: Halcyoninae
- Genus: Todiramphus
- Species: T. lazuli

Binomial name
- Todiramphus lazuli (Temminck, 1830)

Synonyms
- Todirhamphus lazuli (Temminck, 1830) [orth. error]

= Lazuli kingfisher =

Species of bird

The lazuli kingfisher (Todiramphus lazuli) is a species of bird in the family Alcedinidae. It can be found on the islands of Seram, Ambon and Haruku. Found singly and in pairs in lowland wooded areas, including cultivated areas and mangroves. Pale blue underside is unique among kingfishers in its limited south Moluccan range. Rowdy vocalizations include repetitive "ker-chick" series and "ki-ki-ki-ki…" calls. It gets its name due to its colour being reminiscent of lapis lazuli.

== Description ==
A stunning blue-and-white kingfisher with entirely blue upperparts in both sexes. Female has white throat and pale blue breast and belly, but male shows more white, with pale blue confined to belly. Juvenile resembles dull male, with buff throat, spot near bill, and speckled breast and collar.

== Habitat ==
Its natural habitats are subtropical or tropical moist lowland forest, subtropical or tropical mangrove forest, and plantations. It is threatened by habitat loss.
