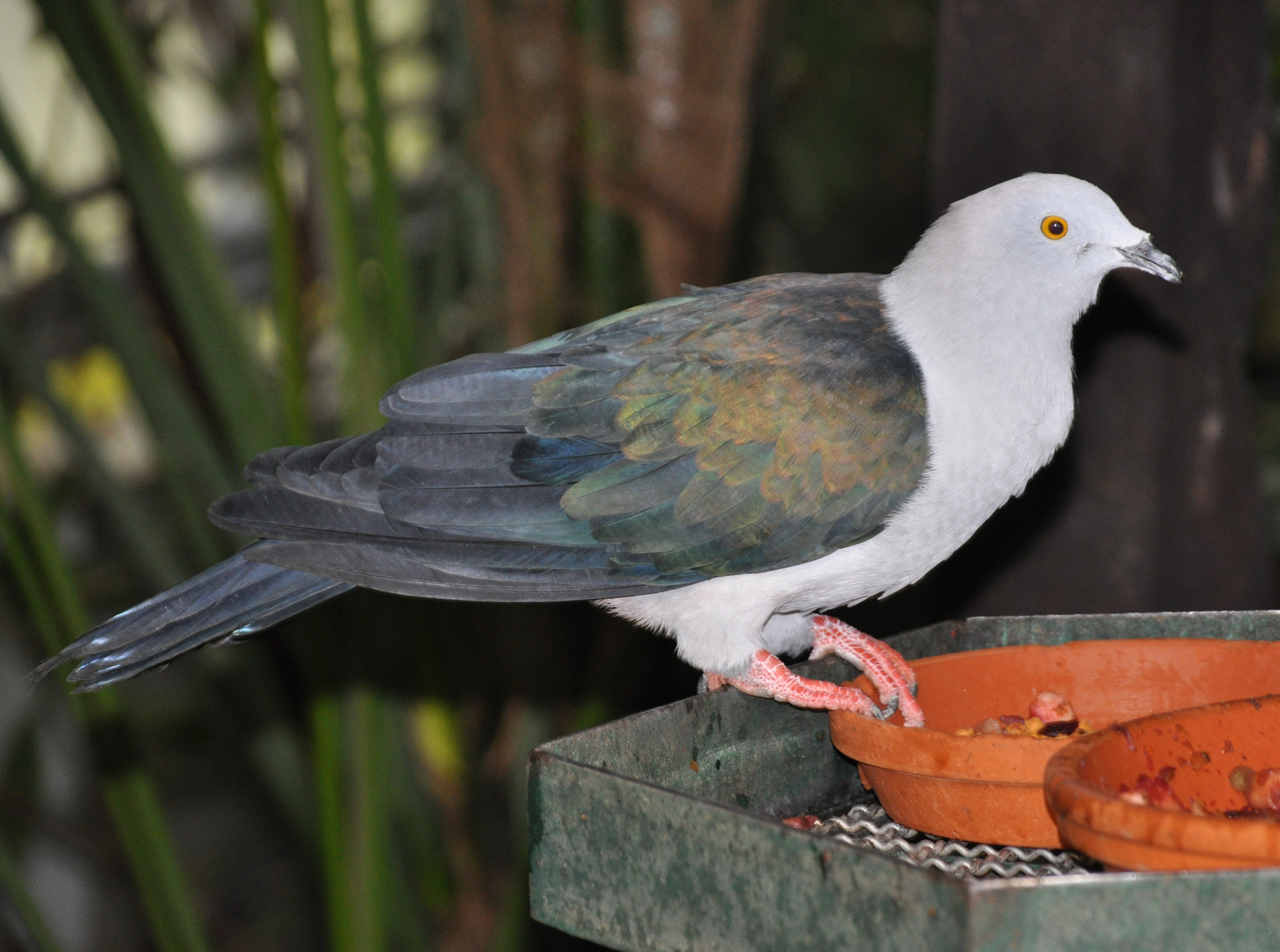

Conservation status
- Least Concern (IUCN 3.1)

Scientific classification
- Kingdom: Animalia
- Phylum: Chordata
- Class: Aves
- Order: Columbiformes
- Family: Columbidae
- Genus: Ducula
- Species: D. concinna

Binomial name
- Ducula concinna (Wallace, 1865)

= Elegant imperial pigeon =

Species of bird

The elegant imperial pigeon (Ducula concinna), also known as blue-tailed imperial-pigeon, is a large pigeon, with upperparts mainly dark blue-green in colour with an iridescent sheen. Head, neck and underparts are mostly pale grey, with red-brown undertail coverts.

== Taxonomy and systematics ==
The elegant imperial pigeon was originally described as Carpophaga concinna by Alfred Russel Wallace in 1865 based on specimens from the Watubela Islands.

== Description ==
The elegant imperial pigeon is a large pigeon, measuring 43 cm (17 in) in length. The head, neck, and upper back are pale grey, with a pink tinge on the nape and back of the crown. The rest of the upperparts are shimmering dark green, while the top of the tail is purplish-blue, sometimes appearing black. The underparts are pale grey with a pink tinge, while the undertail coverts are reddish-brown. The undersides of the tail and wing are black. The bill is black or bluish-grey, with a ring of white feathers at its base, the iris is golden, and the feet are pinkish-red to crimson. Both sexes are similar, but females have darker grey and pink colours. Juveniles are duller than adults.

=== Vocalisations ===
The elegant imperial pigeon's call is a loud, throaty, barking urrauw, made at variable intervals. These are interspersed with low-pitched, loud, upslurred growls. These growls are often produced after another individual has given the bark.

== Distribution and habitat ==
The elegant imperial pigeon inhabits small islands in Wallacea and off New Guinea. It has been recorded from the Talaud Islands, Sangihe, islands off southern Sulawesi, the southern Maluku Islands, and the eastern Lesser Sundas from Romang to Tanimbar, east up to the Aru Islands. Vagrants have also been recorded from Buru and Darwin, Australia.

The elegant imperial pigeon inhabits primary forest, secondary forest, forest edge, and trees in cultivated areas. It mostly inhabits lowlands, but is sometimes found up to elevations of 850 m (2,790 ft).

== Behaviour and ecology ==
The elegant imperial pigeon is thought to migrate between small islands to look for food. One vagrant observed in Australia may have reached there with migrating Torresian imperial pigeons.

=== Diet ===
The elegant imperial pigeon feeds on fruit, and has been recorded feeding on young coconut fruit, Ficus figs, Canarium species, Gnetum gnemon, fish poison trees (Barringtonia asiatica), Moluccan albizia (Falcataria moluccana), Bornean ironwood (Eusideroxylon zwageri), and Indonesian mahogany (Toona sureni). A vagrant in Australia was also observed feeding on banyan and palm trees. Foraging flocks can contain up to 40 birds.

=== Breeding ===
On Damar, nest-building was observed in August, when two nests were found at heights of 25–30 m (82–98 ft) in primary evergreen forest.
