= Spiny Ceram rat =

Conservation status
- Near Threatened (IUCN 3.1)

Scientific classification
- Kingdom: Animalia
- Phylum: Chordata
- Class: Mammalia
- Order: Rodentia
- Family: Muridae
- Genus: Rattus
- Species: R. feliceus

Binomial name
- Rattus feliceus Thomas, 1920

Species of rodent

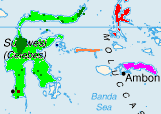
Distribution of the genus Rattus in Sulawesi and Moluccas. In pink the Rattus Feliceus.

The spiny Ceram rat (Rattus feliceus) is a species of rodent in the family Muridae. It is found only in Seram, Indonesia, which it is named after.
