= Ceram rat =

Conservation status
- Endangered (IUCN 3.1)

Scientific classification
- Kingdom: Animalia
- Phylum: Chordata
- Class: Mammalia
- Order: Rodentia
- Family: Muridae
- Subfamily: Murinae
- Tribe: Rattini
- Genus: Nesoromys; Thomas, 1922
- Species: N. ceramicus

Binomial name
- Nesoromys ceramicus (Thomas, 1920)

Synonyms
- Stenomys ceramicus Thomas, 1920

Species of rodent

The Ceram rat (Nesoromys ceramicus), also known as the Seram Island mountain rat, is a species of rodent in the family Muridae. It is found only in Seram Island, Indonesia, where it has been recorded on Mount Mansuela. It is the only species of its genus, Nesoromys.

== Description ==
Nesoromys ceramicus is a small, dark brown- or olive-colored rat. The dorsal side is darker and speckled. The rat has short, dark ears and a long tail.

== Sources ==
- Musser, G. G.; Carleton, M. D. (2005). "Superfamily Muroidea". In Wilson, D. E.; Reeder, D. M. (eds.). Mammal Species of the World: A Taxonomic and Geographic Reference (3rd ed.). Johns Hopkins University Press. pp. 1416–1417. ISBN 978-0-8018-8221-0. OCLC 62265494.
