= Manusela mosaic-tailed rat =

Conservation status
- Endangered (IUCN 3.1)

Scientific classification
- Kingdom: Animalia
- Phylum: Chordata
- Class: Mammalia
- Order: Rodentia
- Family: Muridae
- Genus: Melomys
- Species: M. fraterculus

Binomial name
- Melomys fraterculus (Thomas, 1920)

Species of rodent

The Manusela mosaic-tailed rat (Melomys fraterculus) is a species of rodent in the family Muridae. It is endemic to the rainforests of Seram in Indonesia. It weighs around 66.5g, has a head and body length of 118-135mm and a tail length of 126–140mm.
