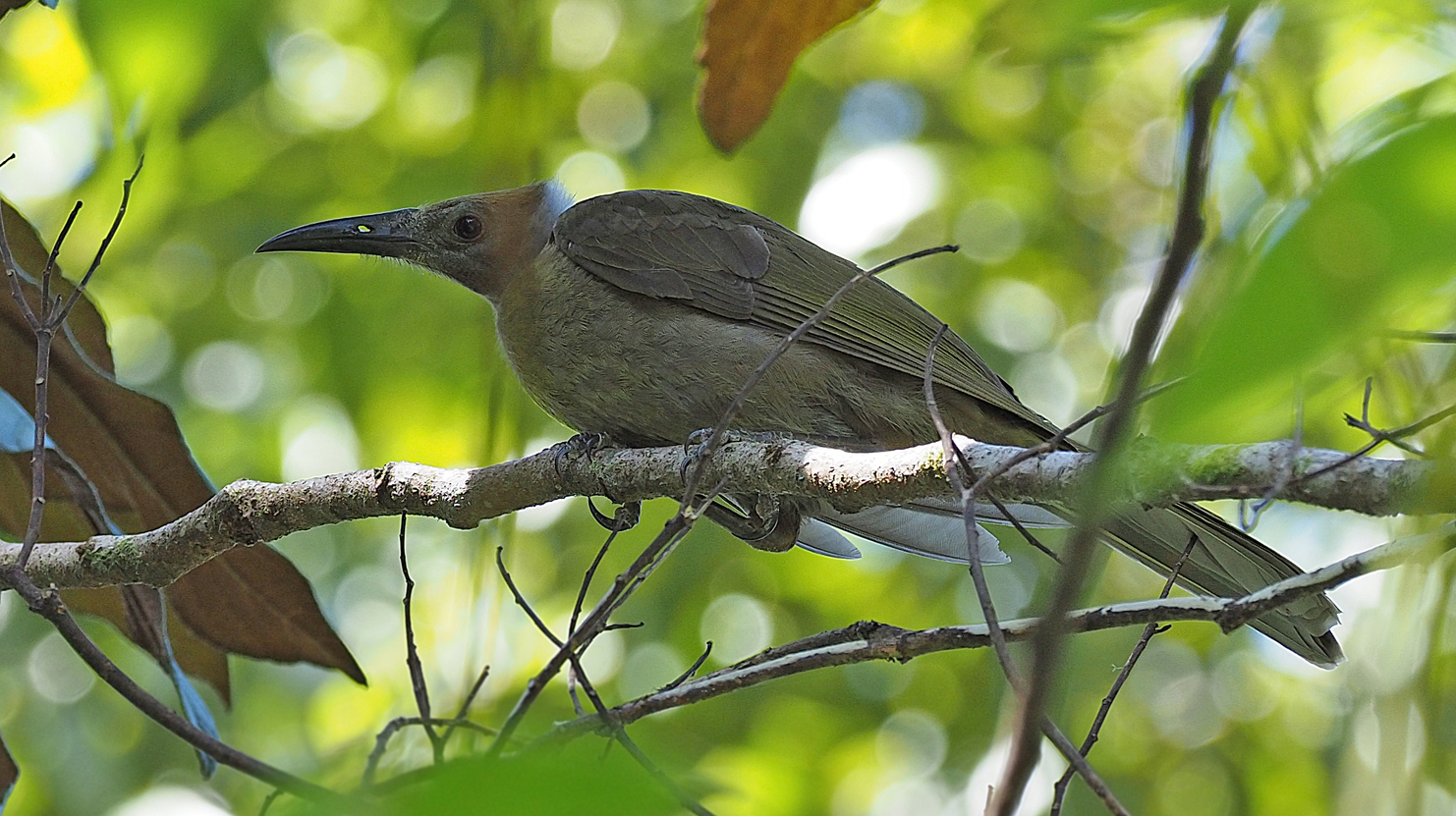

Conservation status
- Least Concern (IUCN 3.1)

Scientific classification
- Kingdom: Animalia
- Phylum: Chordata
- Class: Aves
- Order: Passeriformes
- Family: Meliphagidae
- Genus: Philemon
- Species: P. subcorniculatus

Binomial name
- Philemon subcorniculatus (Hombron & Jacquinot, 1841)

= Seram friarbird =

Species of bird

The Seram friarbird (Philemon subcorniculatus), also known as the grey-necked friarbird, Ceram friarbird, grey-necked honeyeater and gray-necked honeyeater, is a species of bird in the family Meliphagidae. It is endemic to Indonesia where it occurs on Seram Island in the Maluku Islands. Its natural habitats are subtropical or tropical moist lowland forests and subtropical or tropical mangrove forests. They are common and conspicuous and often in small groups of up to four individuals.

The Seram friarbird is the largest of its family, and is approximately 78% heavier than the grey-collared oriole, which is an almost perfect mimic of it.
