= List of airports by IATA code: J =

The DST column shows the months in which Daylight Saving Time, a.k.a. Summer Time, begins and ends. A blank DST box usually indicates that the location stays on Standard Time all year, although in some cases the location stays on Summer Time all year. If a location is currently on DST, add one hour to the time in the Time column.

IATA	ICAO	Airport name	Location served	Time	DST
-JA-
JAA	OAJL	Jalalabad Airport	Jalalabad, Afghanistan	UTC+04:30	
JAB	YJAB	Jabiru Airport	Jabiru, Northern Territory, Australia	UTC+09:30	
JAC	KJAC	Jackson Hole Airport	Jackson, Wyoming, United States	UTC−07:00	Mar-Nov
JAD	YPJT	Jandakot Airport	Perth, Western Australia, Australia	UTC+08:00	
JAE	SPJE	Jaén Airport	Jaén, Peru	UTC−05:00	
JAF	VCCJ	Jaffna International Airport	Jaffna, Sri Lanka	UTC+05:30	
JAG	OPJA	PAF Base Shahbaz	Jacobabad, Pakistan	UTC+05:00	
JAI	VIJP	Jaipur International Airport	Jaipur, Rajasthan, India	UTC+05:30	
JAK	MTJA	Jacmel Airport	Jacmel, Haiti	UTC−05:00	Mar-Nov
JAL	MMJA	El Lencero Airport	Xalapa (Jalapa), Veracruz, Mexico	UTC−06:00	Apr-Oct
JAM	LBIA	Bezmer Air Base	Yambol, Bulgaria	UTC+02:00	Mar-Oct
JAN	KJAN	Jackson–Evers International Airport	Jackson, Mississippi, United States	UTC−06:00	Mar-Nov
JAP	MRCH	Chacarita Airport	Puntarenas, Costa Rica	UTC−06:00	
JAQ		Jacquinot Bay Airport	Jacquinot Bay, Papua New Guinea	UTC+10:00	
JAR	OISJ	Jahrom Airport	Jahrom, Iran	UTC+03:30	Mar-Sep
JAS	KJAS	Jasper County Airport (Bell Field)	Jasper, Texas, United States	UTC−06:00	Mar-Nov
JAT		Jabot Airport	Jabat Island, Marshall Islands	UTC+12:00	
JAU	SPJJ	Francisco Carle Airport	Jauja, Peru	UTC−05:00	
JAV	BGJN	Ilulissat Airport	Ilulissat, Greenland	UTC−03:00	Mar-Oct
JAX	KJAX	Jacksonville International Airport	Jacksonville, Florida, United States	UTC−05:00	Mar-Nov
-JB-
JBB	WARE	Notohadinegoro Airport	Jember, Indonesia	UTC+07:00	
JBD	UAFJ	Jalal-Abad Airport	Jalal-Abad, Kyrgyzstan	UTC+04:00	
JBK	ZWQT	Qitai Jiangbulake Airport	Changji, Xinjiang, China	UTC+08:00	
JBQ	MDJB	La Isabela International Airport (Dr. Joaquin Balaguer Int'l)	La Isabela, Dominican Republic	UTC−04:00	
JBR	KJBR	Jonesboro Municipal Airport	Jonesboro, Arkansas, United States	UTC−06:00	Mar-Nov
JBS	SSSB	São Borja Airport	São Borja, Rio Grande do Sul, Brazil	UTC−03:00	
JBT		Bethel Seaplane Base (FAA: Z59)	Bethel, Alaska, United States	UTC−09:00	Mar-Nov
-JC-
JCB	SSJA	Santa Terezinha Municipal Airport	Joaçaba, Santa Catarina, Brazil	UTC−03:00	
JCI	KIXD	New Century AirCenter (FAA: IXD)	Olathe, Kansas, United States	UTC−06:00	Mar-Nov
JCK	YJLC	Julia Creek Airport	Julia Creek, Queensland, Australia	UTC+10:00	
JCM	SNJB	Jacobina Airport	Jacobina, Bahia, Brazil	UTC−03:00	
JCR	SBEK	Jacareacanga Airport	Jacareacanga, Pará, Brazil	UTC−03:00	
JCT	KJCT	Kimble County Airport	Junction, Texas, United States	UTC−06:00	Mar-Nov
JCY		LBJ Ranch Airport (FAA: 0TE7)	Johnson City, Texas, United States	UTC−06:00	Mar-Nov
-JD-
JDA	KGCD	Grant County Regional Airport (Ogilvie Field) (FAA: GCD)	John Day, Oregon, United States	UTC−08:00	Mar-Nov
JDF	SBJF	Francisco Álvares de Assis Airport	Juiz de Fora, Minas Gerais, Brazil	UTC−03:00	
JDG	RKPD	Jeongseok Airport	Seogwipo, South Korea	UTC+09:00	
JDH	VIJO	Jodhpur Airport	Jodhpur, Rajasthan, India	UTC+05:30	
JDN	KJDN	Jordan Airport	Jordan, Montana, United States	UTC−07:00	Mar-Nov
JDO	SBJU	Juazeiro do Norte Airport	Juazeiro do Norte, Ceará, Brazil	UTC−03:00	
JDR	SNJR	Prefeito Octávio de Almeida Neves Airport	São João del Rei, Minas Gerais, Brazil	UTC−03:00	
JDZ	ZSJD	Jingdezhen Luojia Airport	Jingdezhen, Jiangxi, China	UTC+08:00	
-JE-
JED	OEJN	King Abdulaziz International Airport	Jeddah, Saudi Arabia	UTC+03:00	
JEE	MTJE	Jérémie Airport	Jérémie, Haiti	UTC−05:00	Mar-Nov
JEF	KJEF	Jefferson City Memorial Airport	Jefferson City, Missouri, United States	UTC−06:00	Mar-Nov
JEG	BGAA	Aasiaat Airport	Aasiaat, Greenland	UTC−03:00	Mar-Oct
JEJ		Jeh Airport	Jeh Island, Ailinglaplap Atoll, Marshall Islands	UTC+12:00	
JEK		Jeki Airstrip	Jeki, Zambia	UTC+02:00	
JEQ	SNJK	Jequié Airport	Jequié, Bahia, Brazil	UTC−03:00	
JER	EGJJ	Jersey Airport	Jersey, Channel Islands, United Kingdom	UTC±00:00	Mar-Oct
-JF-
JFK	KJFK	John F. Kennedy International Airport	New York City, New York, United States	UTC−05:00	Mar-Nov
JFN	KHZY	Northeast Ohio Regional Airport (FAA: HZY)	Ashtabula, Ohio, United States	UTC−05:00	Mar-Nov
JFR	BGPT	Paamiut Airport	Paamiut, Greenland	UTC−03:00	Mar-Oct
-JG-
JGA	VAJM	Jamnagar Airport (Govardhanpur Airport)	Jamnagar, Gujarat, India	UTC+05:30	
JGB		Jagdalpur Airport	Jagdalpur, Chhattisgarh, India	UTC+05:30	
JGD	ZYJD	Jiagedaqi Airport	Jiagedaqi, Heilongjiang, China	UTC+08:00	
JGN	ZLJQ	Jiayuguan Airport	Jiayuguan, Gansu, China	UTC+08:00	
JGS	ZSJA	Jinggangshan Airport	Ji'an, Jiangxi, China	UTC+08:00	
-JH-
JHB	WMKJ	Senai International Airport	Johor Bahru, Johor, Malaysia	UTC+08:00	
JHG	ZPJH	Xishuangbanna Gasa Airport	Jinghong, Yunnan, China	UTC+08:00	
JHL		Fort MacKay/Albian Aerodrome (TC: CAL4)	Fort McKay, Alberta, Canada	UTC−07:00	Mar-Nov
JHM	PHJH	Kapalua Airport	Kapalua, Hawaii, United States	UTC−10:00	
JHN	WIMF	Jenderal Besar Abdul Haris Nasution Airport	Panyabungan, North Sumatra, Indonesia	UTC+07:00	
JHS	BGSS	Sisimiut Airport	Sisimiut, Greenland	UTC−03:00	Mar-Oct
JHW	KJHW	Chautauqua County-Jamestown Airport	Jamestown, New York, United States	UTC−05:00	Mar-Nov
-JI-
JIA	SWJN	Juína Airport	Juína, Mato Grosso, Brazil	UTC−04:00	
JIB	HDAM	Djibouti–Ambouli International Airport	Djibouti, Djibouti	UTC+03:00	
JIC	ZLJC	Jinchang Jinchuan Airport	Jinchang, Gansu, China	UTC+08:00	
JIJ	HAJJ	Wilwal International Airport	Jijiga, Ethiopia	UTC+03:00	
JIK	LGIK	Ikaria Island National Airport	Ikaria Island, Greece	UTC+02:00	Mar-Oct
JIL	ZYJL	Jilin Ertaizi Airport	Jilin City, Jilin, China	UTC+08:00	
JIM	HAJM	Aba Segud Airport	Jimma, Ethiopia	UTC+03:00	
JIN	HUJI	Jinja Airport	Jinja, Uganda	UTC+03:00	
JIO	WAPM	Jos Orno Imsula Airport	Tiakur, Southwest Maluku, Indonesia	UTC+07:00	
JIP	SEJI	Jipijapa Airport	Jipijapa, Ecuador	UTC−05:00	
JIQ	ZUQJ	Qianjiang Wulingshan Airport	Qianjiang, Chongqing, China	UTC+08:00	
JIR	VNJI	Jiri Airport	Jiri, Nepal	UTC+05:45	
JIU	ZSJJ	Jiujiang Lushan Airport	Jiujiang, Jiangxi, China	UTC+08:00	
JIW	OPJI	Jiwani Airport	Jiwani, Pakistan	UTC+05:00	
-JJ-
JJA	AGJO	Jajao Airport	Jajao, Isabel Province, Solomon Islands	UTC+11:00	
JJD	SBJE	Comte. Ariston Pessoa Regional Airport	Jijoca de Jericoacoara, Brazil	UTC−03:00	
JJG	SBJA	Humberto Ghizzo Bortoluzzi Regional Airport	Jaguaruna, Santa Catarina, Brazil	UTC−03:00	
JJI	SPJI	Juanjuí Airport	Juanjuí, Peru	UTC−05:00	
JJM	HKMK	Mulika Lodge Airport	Meru National Park, Kenya	UTC+03:00	
JJN	ZSQZ	Quanzhou Jinjiang International Airport	Quanzhou, Fujian, China	UTC+08:00	
JJU	BGQO	Qaqortoq Airport	Qaqortoq, Greenland	UTC−03:00	Mar-Oct
-JK-
JKG	ESGJ	Jönköping Airport	Jönköping, Sweden	UTC+01:00	Mar-Oct
JKH	LGHI	Chios Island National Airport	Chios, Greece	UTC+02:00	Mar-Oct
JKL	LGKY	Kalymnos Island National Airport	Kalymnos, Greece	UTC+02:00	Mar-Oct
JKR	VNJP	Janakpur Airport	Janakpur, Nepal	UTC+05:45	
JKT		metropolitan area^{2}	Jakarta, Indonesia	UTC+07:00	
JKV	KJSO	Cherokee County Airport (FAA: JSO)	Jacksonville, Texas, United States	UTC−06:00	Mar-Nov
-JL-
JLA		Quartz Creek Airport	Cooper Landing, Alaska, United States	UTC−09:00	Mar-Nov
JLN	KJLN	Joplin Regional Airport	Joplin, Missouri, United States	UTC−06:00	Mar-Nov
JLR	VAJB	Jabalpur Airport (Dumna Airport)	Jabalpur, Madhya Pradesh, India	UTC+05:30	
JLS	SDJL	Jales Airport	Jales, São Paulo, Brazil	UTC−03:00	
-JM-
JMB		Jamba Airport	Jamba, Angola	UTC+01:00	
JMJ	ZPJM	Lancang Jingmai Airport	Donghui Township, Yunnan, China	UTC+08:00	
JMK	LGMK	Mykonos Island National Airport	Mykonos, Greece	UTC+02:00	Mar-Oct
JMO	VNJS	Jomsom Airport	Jomsom, Nepal	UTC+05:45	
JMS	KJMS	Jamestown Regional Airport	Jamestown, North Dakota, United States	UTC−06:00	Mar-Nov
JMU	ZYJM	Jiamusi Dongjiao Airport	Jiamusi, Heilongjiang, China	UTC+08:00	
-JN-
JNA	SNJN	Januária Airport	Januária, Minas Gerais, Brazil	UTC−03:00	
JNB	FAOR	O. R. Tambo International Airport	Johannesburg, South Africa	UTC+02:00	
JNG	ZLJN	Jining Da'an Airport	Jining, Shandong, China	UTC+08:00	
JNH	ZSJX	Jiaxing Nanhu Airport	Jiaxing, Zhejiang, China	UTC+08:00	
JNI	SAAJ	Junín Airport	Junín, Buenos Aires, Argentina	UTC−03:00	
JNJ	OOJA	Ja'Aluni Airport	Duqm, Oman	UTC+04:00	
JNU	PAJN	Juneau International Airport	Juneau, Alaska, United States	UTC−09:00	Mar-Nov
JNX	LGNX	Naxos Island National Airport	Naxos, Greece	UTC+02:00	Mar-Oct
JNZ	ZYJZ	Jinzhou Bay Airport	Jinzhou, Liaoning, China	UTC+08:00	
-JO-
JOE	EFJO	Joensuu Airport	Joensuu, Finland	UTC+02:00	Mar-Oct
JOG	WIIJ	Adisucipto International Airport	Yogyakarta, Indonesia	UTC+07:00	
JOH	FAPJ	Port St. Johns Airport	Port St. Johns, South Africa	UTC+02:00	
JOI	SBJV	Joinville-Lauro Carneiro de Loyola Airport	Joinville, Santa Catarina, Brazil	UTC−03:00	
JOJ		Doris Lake Aerodrome (TC: CDL7)	Doris Lake, Nunavut, Canada	UTC−07:00	Mar-Nov
JOK	UWKJ	Yoshkar-Ola Airport	Yoshkar-Ola, Mari El, Russia	UTC+03:00	
JOL	RPMJ	Jolo Airport	Jolo, Philippines	UTC+08:00	
JOM	HTNJ	Njombe Airport	Njombe, Tanzania	UTC+03:00	
JOP		Josephstaal Airport	Josephstaal, Papua New Guinea	UTC+10:00	
JOS	DNJO	Yakubu Gowon Airport	Jos, Nigeria	UTC+01:00	
JOT	KJOT	Joliet Regional Airport	Joliet, Illinois, United States	UTC−06:00	Mar-Nov
-JP-
JPA	SBJP	Presidente Castro Pinto International Airport	João Pessoa, Paraíba, Brazil	UTC−03:00	
JPR	SWJI	José Coleto Airport	Ji-Paraná, Rondônia, Brazil	UTC−04:00	
-JQ-
JQA	BGUQ	Qaarsut Airport (Uummannaq/Qaarsut Airport)	Qaarsut, Greenland	UTC−03:00	Mar-Oct
JQE	MPJE	Jaqué Airport	Jaqué, Panama	UTC−05:00	
-JR-
JRF	PHJR	Kalaeloa Airport (John Rodgers Field)	Kapalua, Hawaii, United States	UTC−10:00	
JRG	VEJH	Veer Surendra Sai Airport	Jharsuguda, Odisha, India	UTC+05:30	
JRH	VEJT	Jorhat Airport (Rowriah Airport)	Jorhat, Assam, India	UTC+05:30	
JRJ	ZSRJ	Ganzhou Ruijin Airport	Ganzhou, Jiangxi, China	UTC+08:00	
JRN	SWJU	Juruena Airport	Juruena, Mato Grosso, Brazil	UTC−04:00	
JRO	HTKJ	Kilimanjaro International Airport	Kilimanjaro, Tanzania	UTC+03:00	
JRS	LLJR	Atarot Airport (Jerusalem International Airport)	Jerusalem, Israel^{1}	UTC+02:00	Mar-Oct
-JS-
JSA	VIJR	Jaisalmer Airport	Jaisalmer, Rajasthan, India	UTC+05:30	
JSH	LGST	Sitia Public Airport	Sitia, Greece	UTC+02:00	Mar-Oct
JSI	LGSK	Skiathos Island National Airport	Skiathos, Greece	UTC+02:00	Mar-Oct
JSJ	XYJS	Jiansanjiang Airport	Jiansanjiang, Heilongjiang, China	UTC+08:00	
JSK	OIZJ	Jask Airport	Jask, Hormozgan, Iran	UTC+03:30	Mar-Sep
JSM	SAWS	José de San Martín Airport	José de San Martín, Chubut, Argentina	UTC−03:00	
JSR	VGJR	Jessore Airport	Jessore, Bangladesh	UTC+06:00	
JST	KJST	John Murtha Johnstown–Cambria County Airport	Johnstown, Pennsylvania, United States	UTC−05:00	Mar-Nov
JSU	BGMQ	Maniitsoq Airport	Maniitsoq, Greenland	UTC−03:00	Mar-Oct
JSY	LGSO	Syros Island National Airport	Syros, Greece	UTC+02:00	Mar-Oct
-JT-
JTC	SBAE	Moussa Nakhl Tobias–Bauru/Arealva State Airport	Bauru, São Paulo, Brazil	UTC−03:00	
JTI	SWJW	Jataí Airport	Jataí, Goiás, Brazil	UTC−03:00	
JTR	LGSR	Santorini (Thira) National Airport	Santorini (Thira), Greece	UTC+02:00	Mar-Oct
JTY	LGPL	Astypalaia Island National Airport	Astypalaia, Greece	UTC+02:00	Mar-Oct
-JU-
JUA	SIZX	Inácio Luís do Nascimento Airport	Juara, Mato Grosso, Brazil	UTC−04:00	
JUB	HJJJ	Juba International Airport	Juba, South Sudan	UTC+03:00	
JUH		Chizhou Jiuhuashan Airport	Chizhou / Tongling, Anhui, China	UTC+08:00	
JUI	EDWJ	Juist Airport	Juist, Lower Saxony, Germany	UTC+01:00	Mar-Oct
JUJ	SASJ	Gobernador Horacio Guzmán International Airport	San Salvador de Jujuy, Jujuy, Argentina	UTC−03:00	
JUL	SPJL	Inca Manco Cápac International Airport	Juliaca, Peru	UTC−05:00	
JUM	VNJL	Jumla Airport	Jumla, Nepal	UTC+05:45	
JUN	YJDA	Jundah Airport	Jundah, Queensland, Australia	UTC+10:00	
JUO	SKJU	Juradó Airport	Juradó, Colombia	UTC−05:00	
JUR	YJNB	Jurien Bay Airport	Jurien Bay, Western Australia, Australia	UTC+08:00	
JUT	MHJU	Juticalpa Airport	Juticalpa, Honduras	UTC−06:00	
JUV	BGUK	Upernavik Airport	Upernavik, Greenland	UTC−03:00	Mar-Oct
JUZ	ZSJU	Quzhou Airport	Quzhou, Zhejiang, China	UTC+08:00	
-JV-
JVA	FMMK	Ankavandra Airport	Ankavandra, Madagascar	UTC+03:00	
JVI		Central Jersey Regional Airport (FAA: 47N)	Manville, New Jersey, United States	UTC−05:00	Mar-Nov
JVL	KJVL	Southern Wisconsin Regional Airport	Janesville, Wisconsin, United States	UTC−06:00	Mar-Nov
-JW-
JWA	FBJW	Jwaneng Airport	Jwaneng, Botswana	UTC+02:00	
JWN	OITZ	Zanjan Airport	Zanjan, Iran	UTC+03:30	Mar-Sep
JWO	RKTI	Jungwon Air Base	Chungju, South Korea	UTC+09:00	
-JX-
JXA	ZYJX	Jixi Xingkaihu Airport	Jixi, Heilongjiang, China	UTC+08:00	
JXN	KJXN	Jackson County Airport (Reynolds Field)	Jackson, Michigan, United States	UTC−05:00	Mar-Nov
-JY-
JYR	OIKJ	Jiroft Airport	Jiroft, Iran	UTC+03:30	Mar-Sep
JYV	EFJY	Jyväskylä Airport	Jyväskylä, Finland	UTC+02:00	Mar-Oct
-JZ-
JZH	ZUJZ	Jiuzhai Huanglong Airport	Jiuzhaigou, Sichuan, China	UTC+08:00	

== Notes ==
- ^1 Airport is located in the West Bank, Palestinian territories.
- ^2 JKT is common IATA code for Soekarno–Hatta International Airport (IATA: CGK) and Halim Perdanakusuma Airport (IATA: HLP).
