= Pattimura Airport =

Airport in Ambon, Indonesia

Pattimura Airport Bandar Udara Pattimura
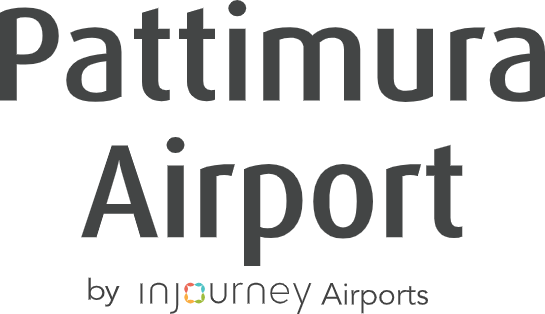

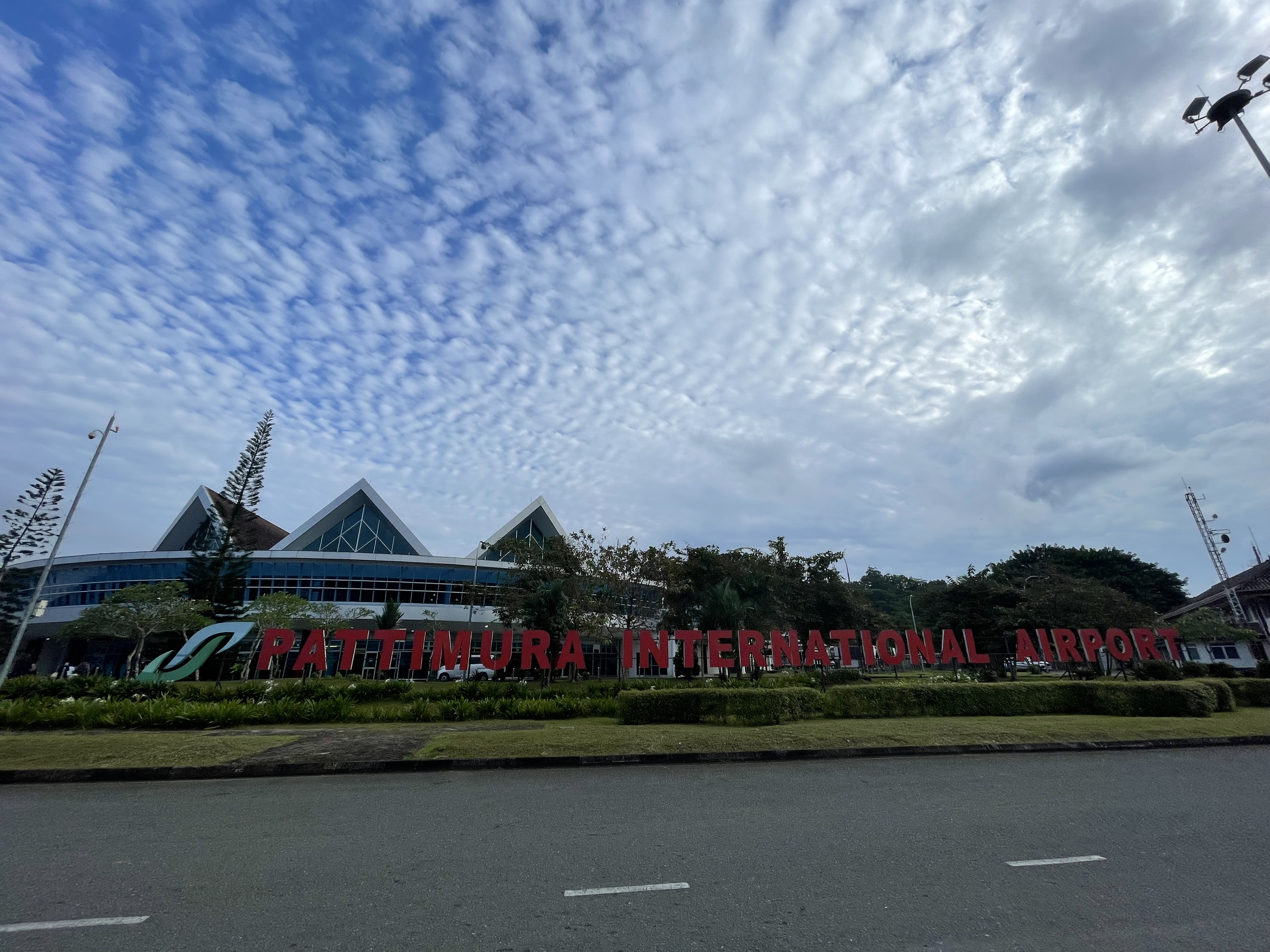
- IATA: AMQ; ICAO: WAPP; WMO: 97724

Summary
- Airport type: Public / Military
- Owner: Government of Indonesia
- Operator: InJourney Airports
- Serves: Ambon
- Location: Laha, Ambon, Maluku, Indonesia
- Opened: 1939; 87 years ago
- Time zone: WIT (UTC+09:00)
- Elevation AMSL: 33 ft (10 m)
- Coordinates: 03°42′36.95″S 128°05′20.89″E
- Website: www.pattimura-airport.co.id

Map
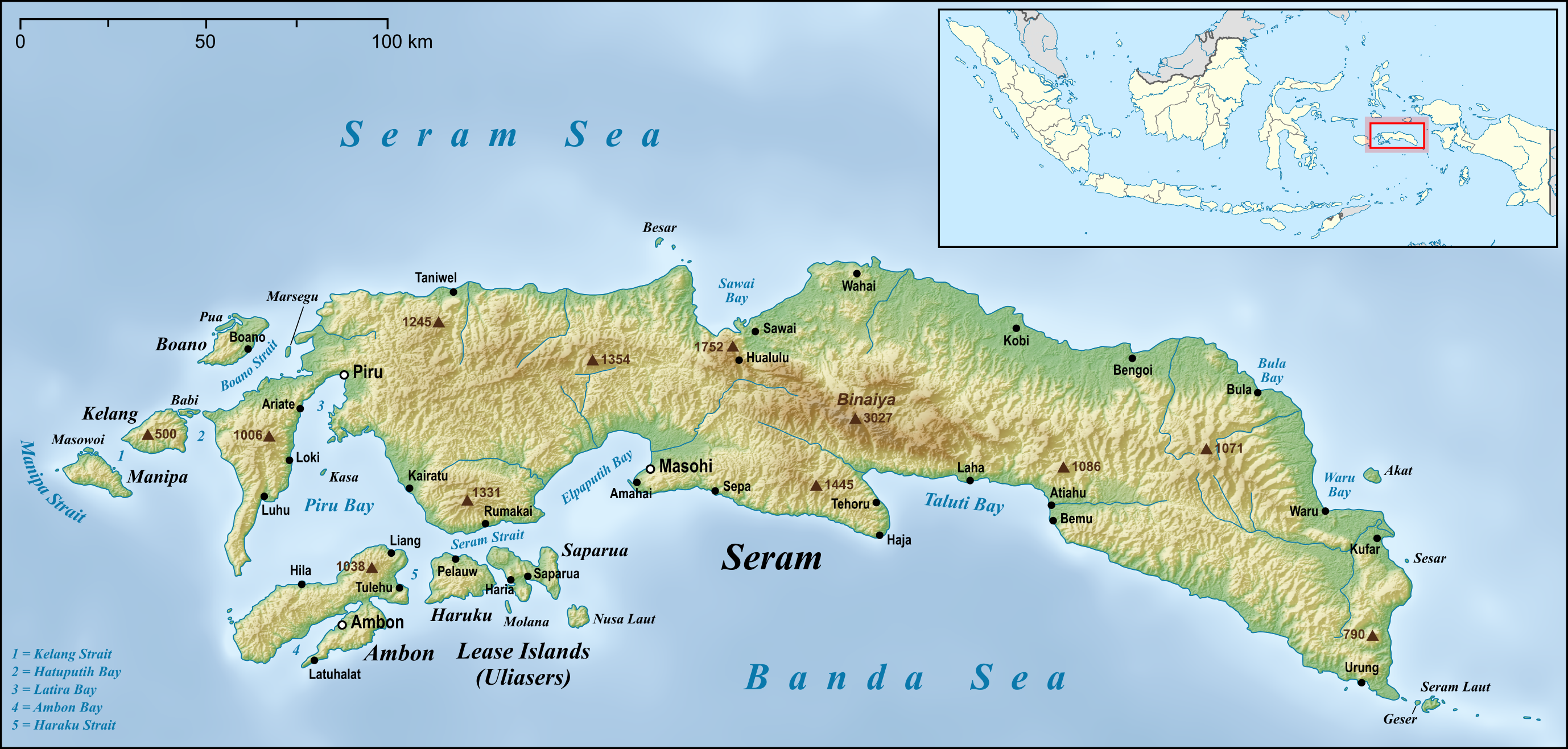
- Location of airport in Maluku / Indonesia AMQ/WAPP (Maluku) AMQ/WAPP (Indonesia)

Runways
Direction	Length		Surface
Direction	m	ft	Surface
04/22	2,500	8,202	Asphalt

Statistics (2024)
- Passengers: 832,751 (▲10.0%)
- Cargo (tonnes): 7,554 (▲11.4%)
- Aircraft movements: 9,152 (▼2.0%)
- Source: DGCA

Pattimura Airport (IATA: AMQ, ICAO: WAPP), formerly known as Laha Airport, is an airport serving Ambon, the capital and largest city of Maluku Province, Indonesia. The airport is the largest and busiest in the Maluku Islands. Located 38 kilometers (23.6 miles) west of Ambon's city center, the airport is named after Thomas Matulessy (1783–1817), an Indonesian national hero from Maluku who is more widely known as Pattimura. He led the resistance against Dutch colonial forces in the 19th century. Pattimura Airport serves as the primary gateway to Ambon and the Maluku Islands, offering regular flights to major Indonesian cities such as Jakarta, Surabaya, and Makassar, as well as regional destinations within Maluku. The airport previously operated international flights to Darwin, Australia, but these services were later discontinued. Its international status was briefly revoked in 2024, before being reinstated the following year.

In addition to its role as a commercial airport, Pattimura Airport also hosts Pattimura Air Force Base, a Type B installation of the Indonesian Air Force. The airbase is situated southeast of the passenger terminal, across the runway.

== History ==
=== World War II ===
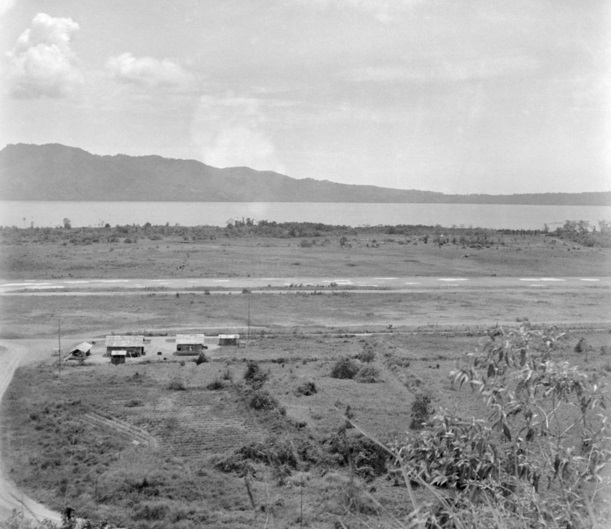
Laha Airfield, 1945

The airport was originally established by the Dutch colonial government in 1939 and was then known as Laha Airfield. It served as a military airbase for the Royal Netherlands East Indies Army Air Force (ML-KNIL). Although located in a remote region, the Dutch recognized the strategic importance of the airfield as a key defensive position in anticipation of a potential Japanese invasion of the Dutch East Indies during the Pacific Theatre in World War II. In 1941, they reinforced the airfield by deploying additional Royal Netherlands East Indies Army troops from Java. The Australian government also acknowledged the airfield's strategic significance, as its capture would allow the Japanese to launch air raids on the Australian mainland. As a result, Australia dispatched forces to assist in the airbase's defense. Prior to the Japanese landing at Ambon in 1942, Laha Airfield was defended by two companies of the Australian 2/21st Battalion alongside approximately 300 Dutch troops. The defensive force was supported by Dutch artillery, which included four 75 mm field guns, four 37 mm anti-tank guns, four 75 mm anti-aircraft guns, four 40 mm anti-aircraft guns, as well as an anti-aircraft machine gun platoon and battery. The Allies had limited air resources to allocate. The ML-KNIL deployed No. 2 Flight, Group IV (2-Vl. G.IV) from Java to Laha, but of the four Brewster F2A Buffalo aircraft originally assigned, two were lost in crashes en route to Ambon. The Royal Australian Air Force (RAAF) contributed two flights comprising a total of 12 Lockheed Hudson Mk II light bombers from No. 13 and No. 2 Squadrons. One flight was stationed at Laha, while the other was deployed to Namlea on the neighboring island of Buru.

Japanese troops landed on Ambon on 30 January 1942, and the first ground assault on Laha Airfield took place the next day. An Australian platoon positioned northeast of the airfield came under attack from a larger Japanese force but successfully repelled the assault. Meanwhile, Japanese reinforcements arrived, and a sustained offensive against the Allied defenders began, involving naval artillery, dive bombers, fighter aircraft, and infantry probing attacks. A Japanese night assault through tall grass near the beach—between two Allied positions—was also driven back by an Australian platoon. However, at dawn on 2 February, the Japanese launched a major offensive. By 10:00 a.m., only around 150 Australian troops and several KNIL personnel remained combat-effective at Laha. They surrendered shortly thereafter.

After the capture of Laha Airfield, Japanese forces executed more than 300 Australian and Dutch prisoners of war who had surrendered there. Personnel from the Imperial Japanese Navy selected the prisoners at random and carried out summary executions in four separate massacres around the airfield. The victims were bayoneted, clubbed to death, or beheaded—none survived. Following the war, 93 Japanese personnel were tried by an Australian military tribunal in Ambon for war crimes related to the Laha massacres. Several were convicted and executed.

The base was extensively used by Japanese forces throughout the occupation to support their military operations. Aircraft stationed at Ambon participated in the major air raids on Darwin, Australia, on 19 February 1942.

=== Independence era ===
After Indonesia declared independence, the airport was taken over by the Indonesian Air Force and continued to function as a military airbase. During the Permesta rebellion in the 1950s, the airbase was targeted and bombed multiple times by the Permesta Air Force (AUREV), which received covert support from the United States. Several Indonesian Air Force aircraft were damaged during the bombing raids. Among those involved in the attacks was Allen Lawrence Pope, an American CIA pilot who flew missions for AUREV. On 18 May 1958, Pope's Douglas A-26 Invader was shot down over Ambon by an Indonesian Air Force P-51 Mustang after he bombed the airfield. His capture and the discovery of American involvement in the rebellion marked a turning point in the conflict.

On 1 August 1962, when the Indonesian government created a unit responsible for overseeing the civil aviation maintenance and operations of airports for civilian air transport. Despite this, the airport remained under the control of the Indonesian Air Force. In 1975, following a Joint Decree by the Minister of Defense, the Armed Forces Commander, the Minister of Transportation, and the Minister of Finance, the airport was officially designated as a civilian airfield and came under the full jurisdiction of the Department of Transportation. On 11 October 1995, the management of Pattimura Airport was transferred to Angkasa Pura I, a state-owned enterprise responsible for managing airports in central and eastern Indonesia, which is now known as InJourney Airports.

The first international flight to Ambon began in 1975, with Airnorth operating a route to Darwin, Australia. This service continued until 1998. While occasional charter flights to Darwin have been arranged in conjunction with boating events, there have been no regularly scheduled international flights since then. In 2024, due to the prolonged absence of international operations, the Ministry of Transportation officially revoked the airport's international status. The airport's international status was reactivated in August 2025. Following the reinstatement of its international status, proposals have been made for the airport to resume international services, including the launch of new routes or the reinstatement of previously discontinued routes, such as those to Darwin.

== Facilities and development ==
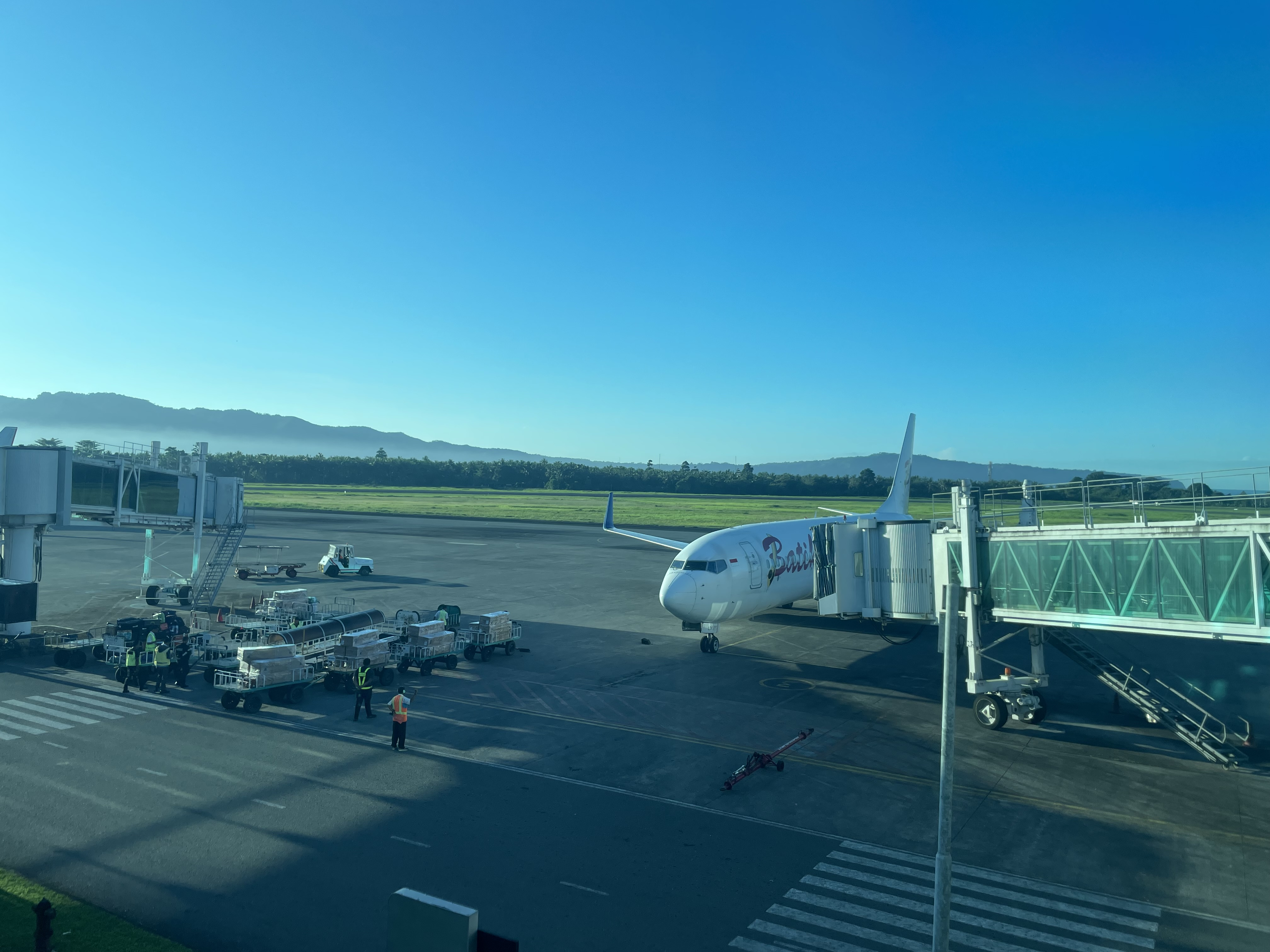
Apron view of the airport

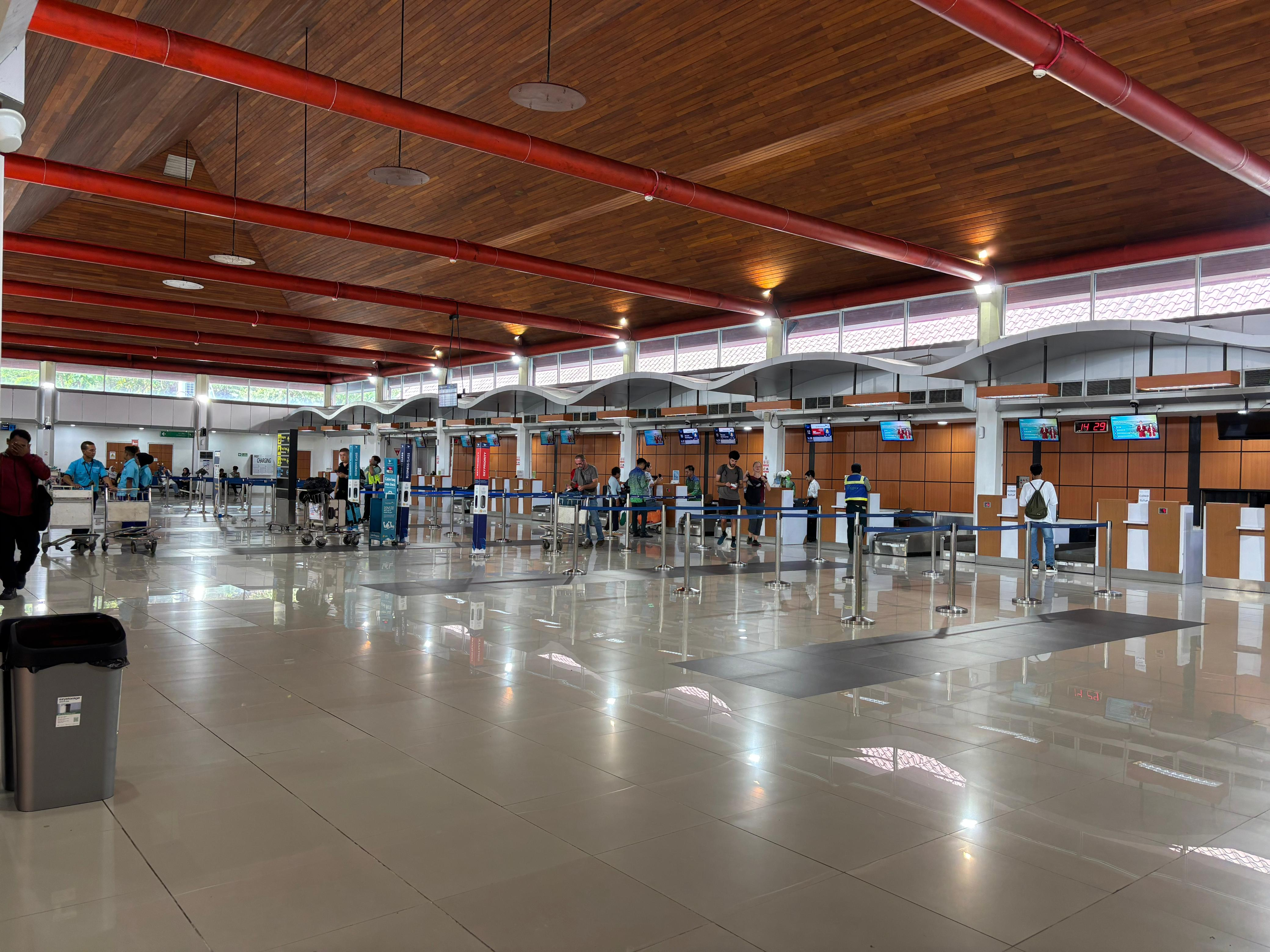
Check-in hall

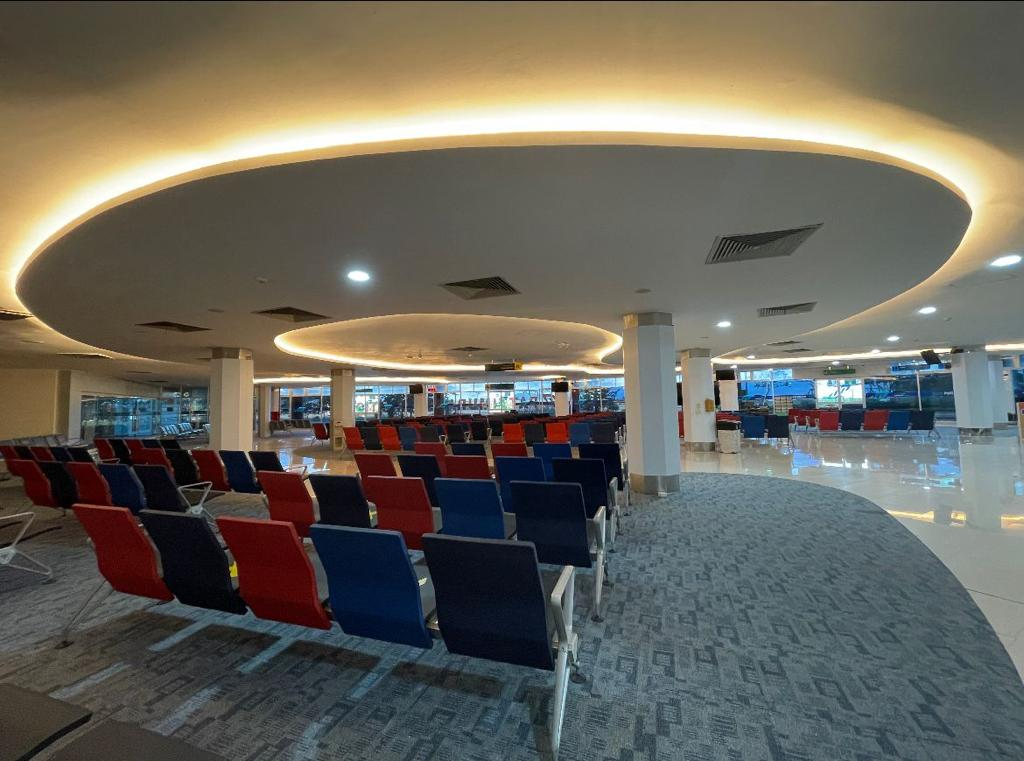
Boarding gate

The airport has a single runway measuring 2,500 m × 45 m, capable of accommodating narrow-body aircraft such as the Boeing 737 and Airbus A320. It is equipped with two aprons, measuring 151 m × 90 m and 214 m × 112 m respectively. The airport also has two taxiways, measuring 280 m × 23 m and 443 m × 23 m respectively.

In 2016, the Ministry of Transportation approved an initial investment of Rp 45 billion for the airport's renovation, to be disbursed through 2018 and carried out in phases. The airport upgrade was completed in 2021 after several years of delays. As part of the expansion, the terminal area was increased from 10,270 m^{2} to 16,090 m^{2}, boosting its annual passenger capacity from 800,000 to 1.5 million. The previous capacity had already been exceeded, with the airport serving approximately 1.3 million passengers in 2019. The renovated terminal now features a total of five gates, three of which are equipped with jet bridges. The terminal building facade has a more modern appearance while retaining characteristics of traditional Moluccan architecture, combined with glass accents and supporting columns.

Although the airport does not currently serve any regular international flights, it is equipped with the necessary facilities to accommodate them, including an immigration office, a quarantine facility, and a tax office.

== Airlines and destinations ==
=== Passenger ===
Airlines	Destinations
Batik Air	Jakarta–Soekarno-Hatta, Makassar, Nabire
Citilink	Jakarta–Soekarno-Hatta
Garuda Indonesia	Jakarta–Soekarno-Hatta
Lion Air	Jakarta–Soekarno-Hatta, Langgur, Makassar, Sorong, Surabaya
Smart Aviation	Banda Neira, Kisar, Wahai
Trigana Air	Namrole, Sanana, Tiakur
Wings Air	Dobo, Namlea, Saumlaki, Ternate

== Statistics ==
Annual passenger numbers and aircraft statistics
Year	Passengers handled	Passenger % change	Cargo (tonnes)	Cargo % change	Aircraft movements	Aircraft % change
2006	444,314	Steady	2,342	Steady	7,230	Steady
2007	523,552	▲17.8	2,736	▲16.8	7,889	▲9.1
2008	534,270	▲2.0	2,884	▲5.4	7,609	▼3.5
2009	660,415	▲23.6	2,683	▼7.0	9,099	▲19.6
2010	719,254	▲8.9	2,931	▲9.2	11,305	▲24.2
2011	819,651	▲14.0	2,999	▲2.3	10,804	▼4.4
2012	1,075,031	▲31.2	2,825	▼5.8	11,084	▲2.6
2013	1,002,419	▼6.8	3,800	▲34.5	12,827	▲15.7
2014	1,192,355	▲18.9	4,895	▲28.8	15,986	▲24.6
2015	1,317,041	▲10.5	6,024	▲23.1	16,767	▲4.9
2016	1,360,183	▲3.3	5,790	▼3.9	17,601	▲5.0
2017	1,364,210	▲0.3	6,904	▲19.2	19,874	▲12.9
2018	1,515,993	▲11.1	7,972	▲15.5	20,079	▲1.0
2019	1,198,829	▼20.9	5,595	▼29.8	15,471	▼22.9
2020	614,057	▼48.8	5,751	▲2.8	10,440	▼32.5
2021	735,104	▲19.7	7,247	▲26.0	12,140	▲16.3
2022	990,974	▲34.8	7,650	▲5.6	12,870	▲6.0
2023	757,203	▼23.6	6,782	▼11.3	9,338	▼27.4
2024	832,751	▲10.0	7,554	▲11.4	9,152	▼2.0
^{Source: DGCA, BPS}

== Ground transportation ==
=== DAMRI Bus ===
Perum DAMRI operates a bus service connecting Pattimura Airport to the surrounding area. Currently, there is only one route in operation, running between Pattimura Airport and Merdeka Square in downtown Ambon.

The route from the airport to Merdeka Square is as follows: Pattimura Airport – Hative Besar – Wayame – Poka – Rumah Tiga – Waiheru – Nania – Passo – Lateri – Halong – Galala – Batu Merah – DPRD Office – Hotel Manise – Hotel Amboina – Tugu Trikora – Mangga Dua – Jasindo Insurance Office – Hotel Abdulalie – Jalan AY Patty – Merdeka Square.

The return route from Merdeka Square to the airport is as follows: Merdeka Square – Supermarket Ground – Citra – Batu Merah – Galala – Halong – Lateri – Passo – Nania – Waiheru – Poka – Rumah Tiga – Wayame – Hative Besar – Pattimura Airport.

=== Taxi ===
Taxis also operate to and from the airport, providing another transportation option for passengers. Two types of vehicles are available: sedans and minivans. Previously, travelers had to use a ferry to cross Ambon Bay when heading to the city center. However, the construction of the Merah Putih Bridge has significantly reduced travel time between the airport and downtown Ambon.

== Accidents and incidents ==
- On 24 July 1992, Mandala Airlines Flight 660 crashed when on approach to Pattimura Airport. All 70 passengers and crew on board were killed.
- On 7 June 1997, a Merpati Nusantara Airlines flight collided with a tree on approach but was able to land safely.
- On 2 January 2007, Lion Air Flight JT 797 skidded on the runway stopping just 4 meters before the end of the runway. Neither the plane nor any of the passengers were injured, but a runway light was damaged. The accident occurred at 8:14 am during heavy rains.
