= Leti (island) =

Island in Indonesia

Coordinates: 8.1667°S 127.7000°E

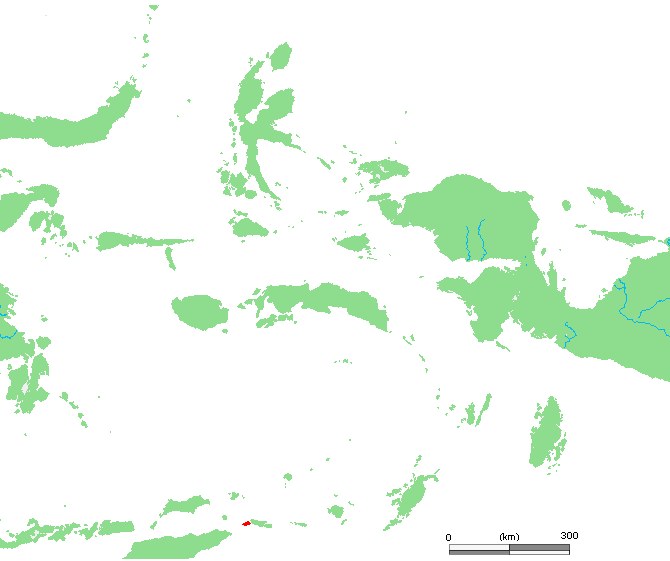
Map of Maluku archipelago. Leti (marked in red) is located in southwestern part of the archipelago.

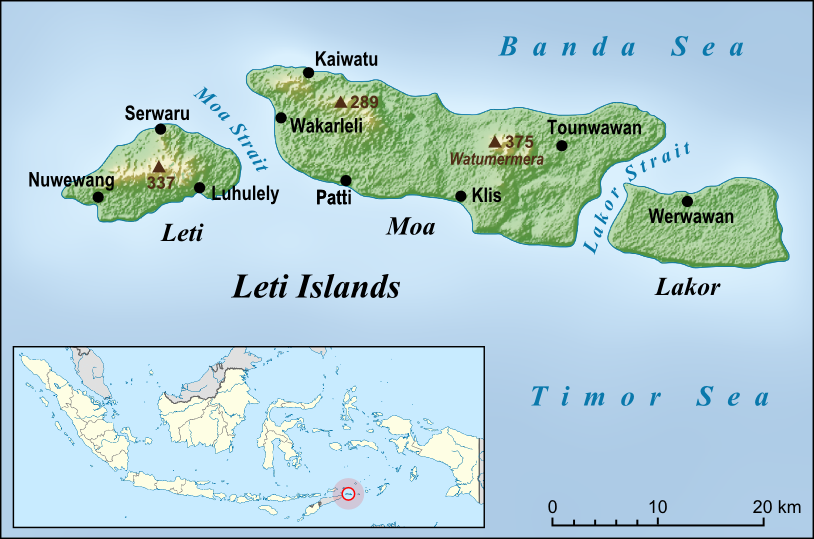

Leti is an Indonesian island, the westernmost of the Leti Islands, and one of the 92 officially listed outlying islands of Indonesia. Leti is located in southwest Maluku province. The main town is Sewaru.

The geology of Leti reveals how continental crust is subducted to at least 30 km depth causing pieces to rip off, then move up the subduction channel back to the surface. For example, Leti is the only island in the Maluku chain with in situ blueschist. This rare occurrence of blueschist in Leti was first documented in 1915 by Dutch geologists who spent one month on the island producing a detailed geological map, cross section and description of the geological units. In their 220 page monograph they report finding sodic amphibole (crossite) in mafic and pelitic metamorphic rocks structurally overlain by an ultramafic body. They also found melange below and around the ultramafic body with blocks of Tertiary limestone scattered among a variety of other igneous, metamorphic and sedimentary material. They relate this unit to melange of similar composition reported in West Timor.

The Leti language, a member of Austronesian languages is spoken on Leti.

== See also ==
- List of islands of Indonesia
- Maluku Islands
- Maluku (province)
- Yene
