= Moa Island =

Moa Island may refer to:

- Moa (island), Indonesia
- Moa Island (Queensland)
