= SXK =

SXK or sxk may refer to:

- SXK, the IATA code for Mathilda Batlayeri Airport, Maluku, Indonesia
- sxk, the ISO 639-3 code for the Yoncalla language, an extinct Kalapuyan language of the United States of America
