= Mdona Hyera =

Island group in Maluku, indonesia

Coordinates: 8°11′30″S 128°48′45″E

The Sermata Islands or Sematang Islands (formerly called Mdona Hyera), is a small group of islands within the Southwest Maluku Regency, part of Maluku (province) in Indonesia. The group is located south of the Damer Islands, east of the Letti Islands and west of the Babar Islands.

They originally formed the Mdona Hyera District (Kecamatan Mdona Hyera) within the regency, but by 2023 were renamed "Luang Sermata Islands" District. They consist of the main island of Pulau Sermatang and the much smaller island of Pulau Luang to its west, together with smaller islands situated between the two - notably Kelapa, Kepury and Tiara Islands. Other small and generally unpopulated islands form part of the district, including Liakra and Matumara Islands off Luang, Letutun and Lailawan to the west of the main group, Amoertaun and Meatiaram even further to the west, and Metimarang to the southwest.

Sermata Island had 4,003 inhabitants in mid 2023, resident in nine villages - Elo, Rumkisar, Lelang, Mahaleta, Romdara, Rotnama, Batugajah, Pupliora and Regoha. Luang Island consisted of two separate islands, together with a number of islets between them; the main sections are Luang Timur with 1,303 inhabitants, and Luang Barat with 1,059 inhabitants in 2023. The whole district covers a land area of 232.29 km^{2}, and had 6,741 inhabitants in mid 2025.

== Villages ==
The Luang Sermata Islands District comprises eleven rural villages (desa), all sharing the postcode 97652, listed below with their areas and their populations as officially estimated for mid 2024.

Kode Wilayah	Name of kelurahan or desa	Area in km^{2}	Pop'n Estimate mid 2024
81.08.03.2001	Luang Barat	6.75	1,067
81.08.03.2002	Luang Timur	14.81	1,340
81.08.03.2003	Elo	23.42	785
81.08.03.2004	Rumkisar	28.69	347
81.08.03.2005	Lelang	32.22	568
81.08.03.2007	Romdara	16.91	401
81.08.03.2006	Mahaleta	24.52	473
81.08.03.2008	Rotnama	15.32	245
81.08.03.2009	Batugajah	21.20	358
81.08.03.2010	Pupliora	23.68	520
81.08.03.2011	Regoha	24.77	425
81.08.03	Total District	232.29	6,529
