= Mandala Airlines Flight 660 =

1992 aviation accident

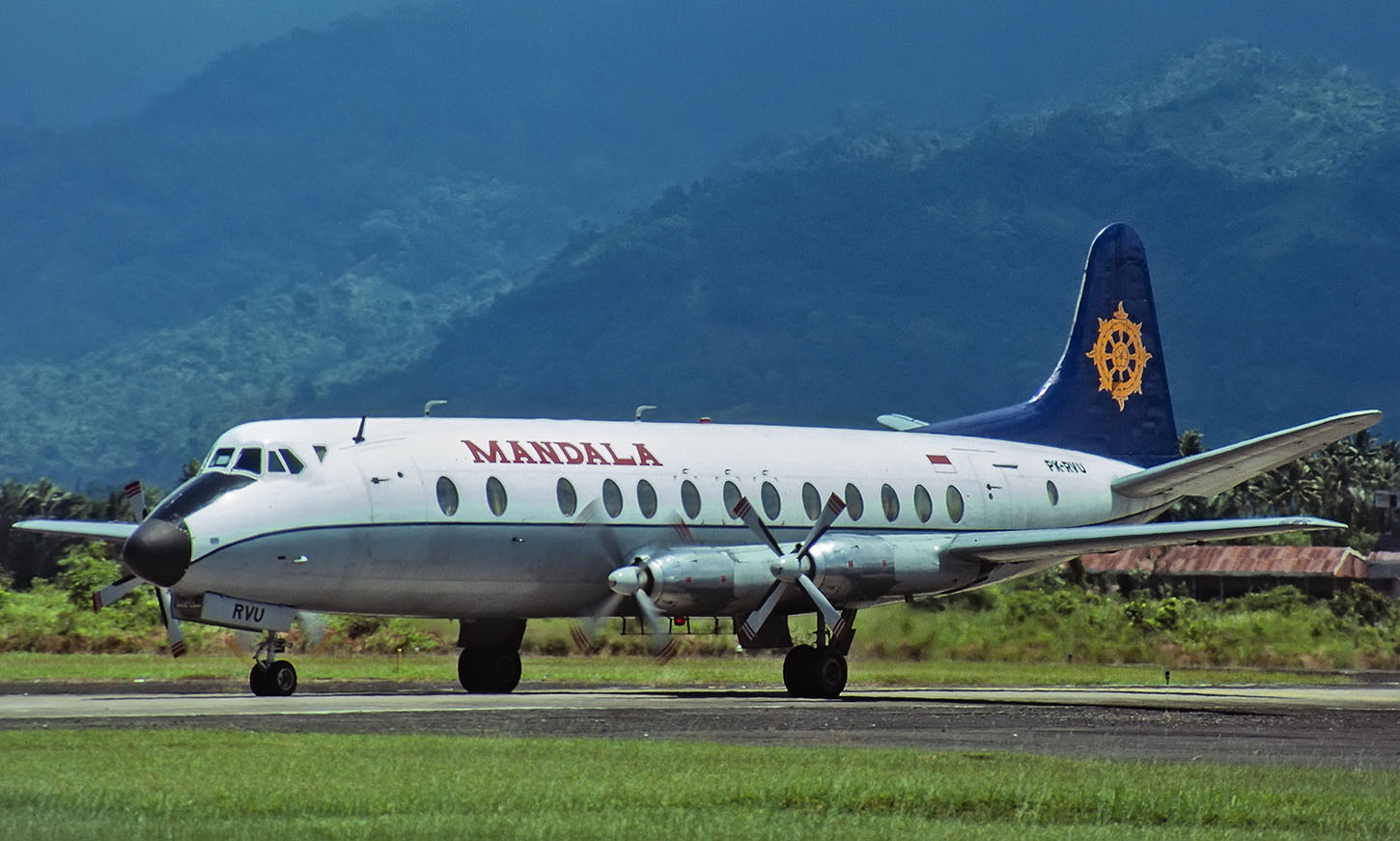
- PK-RVU, the aircraft involved in the accident, in 1988

Accident
- Date: 24 July 1992
- Summary: Controlled flight into terrain by pilot error
- Site: Mount Liliboy, Indonesia

Aircraft
- Aircraft type: Vickers Viscount 816
- Aircraft name: Nias
- Operator: Mandala Airlines
- IATA flight No.: RI660
- ICAO flight No.: MDL660
- Call sign: MANDALA 660
- Registration: PK-RVU
- Flight origin: Sultan Hasanuddin International Airport, Makassar, Indonesia
- Destination: Pattimura Airport, Ambon, Indonesia
- Occupants: 70
- Passengers: 63
- Crew: 7
- Fatalities: 70
- Survivors: 0

Mandala Airlines Flight 660 was a scheduled passenger flight on 24 July 1992 which crashed in Indonesia into a mountain on Ambon Island as it attempted to land at Pattimura Airport in poor weather conditions. On approach to Pattimura, the aircraft struck the slope of Mt. Liliboy about 14 km southwest of Runway 04 while trying to land in heavy rain, at around 16:30 local time. The aircraft disintegrated on impact and there were no survivors. The cause was attributed to pilot error after the aircraft was approaching at an insufficient altitude in inclement weather condition.

== Aircraft ==
The aircraft was a Vickers Viscount 816 serial number 434, which first flew on 8 June 1959. It was delivered on 17 June 1959 to Trans Australia Airlines as VH-TVQ and named McDouall Stuart which operated the aircraft until 1970. It later leased the aircraft to Far Eastern Air Transport and Merpati Nusantara Airlines. By 1987, the aircraft had been bought by Mandala Airlines and was registered as PK-RVU and was named as Nias.

== Passengers and crew ==
Most of the passengers were tourists who were visiting the islands and businessmen. All of whom were Indonesians. According to authorities, there were 7 children aboard the flight. The commander of the flight was identified as Herman Amry. The identities of the other flight crews were not disclosed.

== Accident ==
Flight 660 was a regularly scheduled domestic flight from Ujung Pandang, the capital of South Sulawesi's province, to Ambon, then-provincial capital of Maluku. The flight initially had arrived from Jakarta with an intermediate stop in Surabaya. Most of the passengers were tourists and local businessmen. During the approach to Ambon's Patttimura Airport, the aircraft encountered severe weather which limited visibility. The crew failed to locate the runway and decided to turn around to attempt another landing. While circling, the crew radioed the ATC and stated "We're turning to the airport". This was the last transmission from Flight 660. During the second approach, as the aircraft descended, it struck Mount Liliboy at around 16:30 local time, exploding on impact and instantly killing everyone on board.

== Response ==
Pattimura's ATC lost any contact with Flight 660 approximately 5 minutes before it was due to land. It eventually missed its landing and was declared as missing. Search and rescue teams were eventually notified to scour the sea and the mountains to the southwest of the airport. Approximately 24 hours later, the crash site was found after a child from a village at the mountain had spotted a life jacket from the aircraft and brought it back to officials at the airport.

The crash site was located approximately 15 km from the airport. No signs of life were spotted, and the aircraft was destroyed to bits, with bodies could be seen scattered across the area. Most of the victims were difficult to identify. The crash site was difficult to access, and rescuers had to climb on foot to reach the site, taking approximately 4 hours to reach it. The operation was further hampered by bad weather, which caused the terrain to be muddy and slippery. Helicopters were deployed to evacuate the bodies to nearby beach to be transported to Jakarta for further identification. Two days after the crash, all of the bodies had been recovered from the site. Some of the bodies would be transported to Jakarta by a special flight.

Mandala Airlines offered condolences and stated that family members of each victim would be compensated with a total of approximately $10,000 USD.
