= John Becker Airport =

John Becker Airport Bandar Udara John Becker
- IATA: KSX; ICAO: WATQ

Summary
- Airport type: Public
- Owner: Government of Indonesia
- Operator: UPT Ditjen Hubud
- Serves: Wonreli
- Location: Kisar, Southwest Maluku Regency, Maluku, Indonesia
- Elevation AMSL: 65 ft (20 m)
- Coordinates: 08°00′56.8″S 127°12′01.6″E

Map
- Location of airport in Maluku / Indonesia KSX (Indonesia)

Runways
Direction	Length		Surface
Direction	ft	m	Surface
11/29	3,116	950	Asphalt
- DGCA

John Becker Airport (Indonesian: Bandar Udara John Becker) (IATA: KSX, ICAO: WATQ) is a domestic airport serving the town of Wonreli within Kisar Island in Southwest Maluku Regency, Maluku, Indonesia. The airport is operated by the Technical Implementation Unit of the Directorate General of Civil Aviation.

== History ==
John Becker Airport was built in 1993. The airport is named after John Joseph Bakker, an Indonesian independence hero from Kisar. Note that the airport's official name is written as "John Becker", although the surname should be spelled "Bakker".

In 2021, SAM Air introduced pioneer flights linking Ambon, Tiakur, and Kisar.

In January 2023, Susi Air began operating pioneer air services linking Kisar and Kupang.

On 22 March 2025, strong winds damaged the roof of the passenger terminal building. No casualties were reported, and airport operations continued.

== Facilities ==
John Becker Airport is a Class III airport operated by the Directorate General of Civil Aviation. The airport has a runway measuring 950 x 23 metres, a taxiway measuring 75 x 15 metres, and an apron measuring 108 x 46 metres.

The passenger terminal has an area of 240 square metres and yearly capacity of 4,277 passengers.

== Airlines and destinations ==
Airlines	Destinations
SAM Air	Moa/Tiakur
Susi Air	Kupang
