= Bandanaira Airport =

Bandanaira Airport Bandar Udara Bandanaira
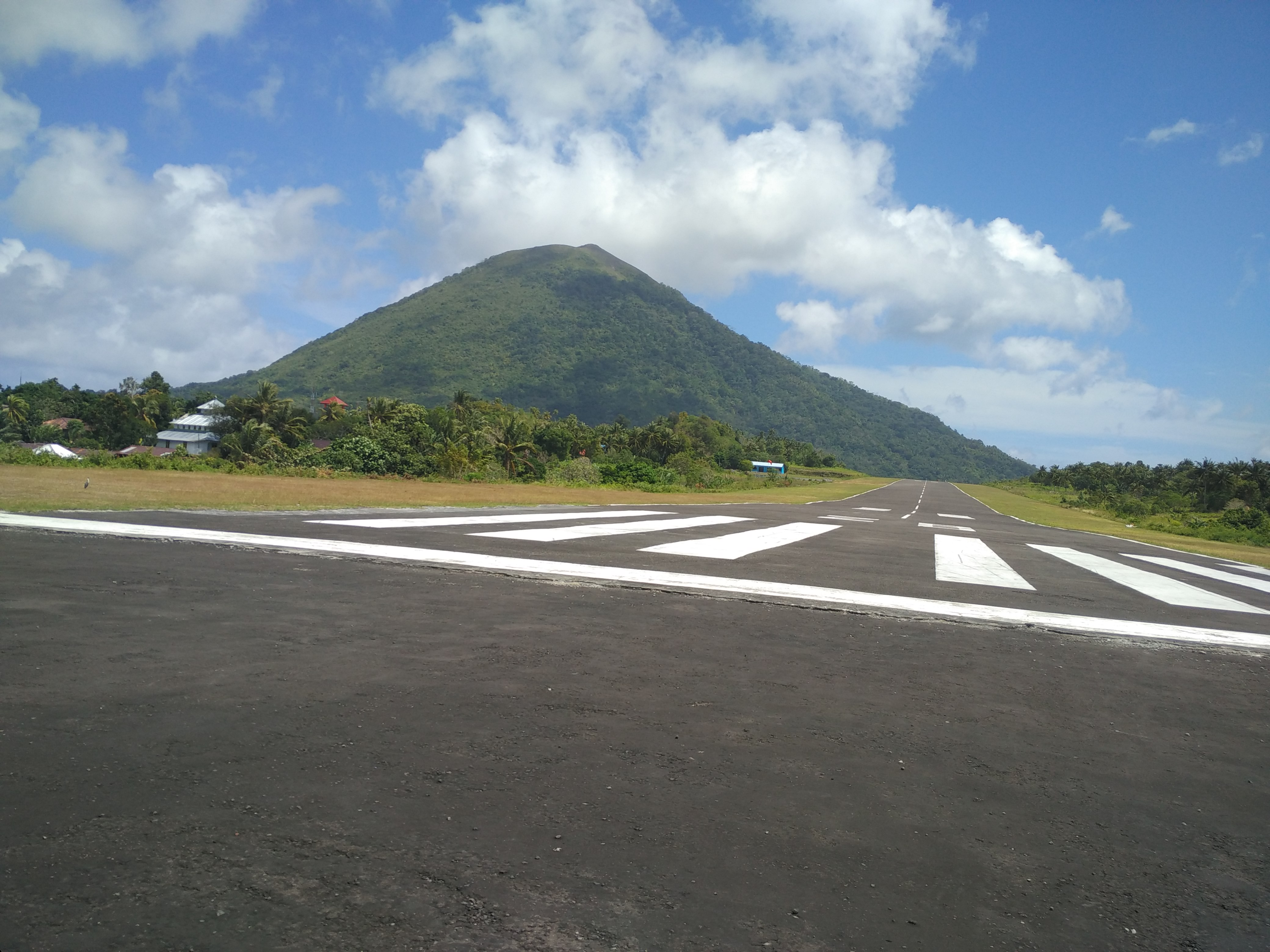
- IATA: NDA; ICAO: WAPC

Summary
- Airport type: Public
- Operator: UPT Ditjen Hubud
- Serves: Bandanaira
- Location: Bandanaria, Maluku, Indonesia
- Time zone: WITA (UTC+09:00)
- Elevation AMSL: 82 ft / 25 m
- Coordinates: 04°31′18″S 129°54′14″E

Map
- Location in Maluku

Runways
Direction	Length		Surface
Direction	ft	m	Surface
10/28	2,953	900	Asphalt (98 ft or 30 m wide)

Bandanaira Airport (also known as Banda Neira Airport) (IATA: NDA, ICAO: WAPC) is a public airport on Banda Neira in the Banda Islands of Maluku, Indonesia and one of the smallest airports in the country. The Banda Islands are a popular tourist destination for divers and snorkelers.

Most tourists come between February–May and September–December because that is when the weather is most suitable for snorkeling and diving.

== Facilities ==
This airport is a very small airport with few facilities. When planes take off or land, the airport sounds a siren to warn local residents to clear off the runway.

The largest aircraft that the runway can handle is a C-212.

== Airlines and destinations ==
Airlines	Destinations
Smart Aviation	Ambon, Amahai

== Ground transportation ==
Local ground transport is available to and from the Banda airport either from private hire cars or motorcycle taxis called "ojek."

== Incidents ==
- Between 1998 and 2008 there were four incidents at this airport. It is a tricky airport to land at due to the small runway, and the nearby volcano.
- On June 5, 2006 Merpati Nusantara Airlines flight number 9971 attempting to land at Bandanaira Airport skidded and veered off the runway. There was heavy rain at the time. The aircraft sustained damage to its wheels, wings and the fuselage cracked, but there were no fatalities.
