= Mathilda Batlayeri Airport =

Airport in Maluku, Indonesia

Mathilda Batlayeri Airport Bandar Udara Mathilda Batlayeri
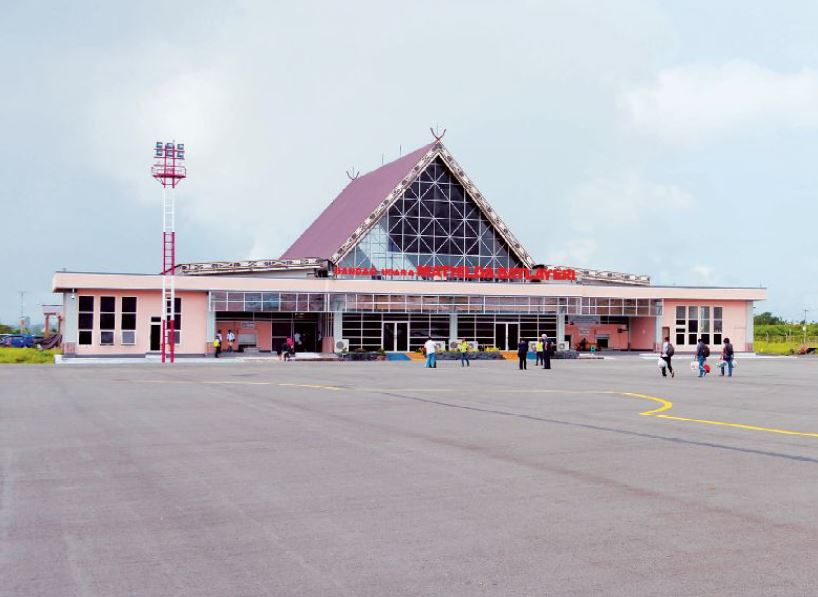
- IATA: SXK; ICAO: WAPS

Summary
- Airport type: Public
- Owner: Government of Indonesia
- Operator: Directorate General of Civil Aviation
- Serves: Saumlaki
- Location: Tumbur, Wer Tamrian, Tanimbar Islands Regency, Maluku, Indonesia.
- Time zone: WIT (UTC+09:00)
- Elevation AMSL: 410 ft / 125 m
- Coordinates: 7.849529°S 131.333998°E

Map
- Location of airport in Maluku Islands

Runways
Direction	Length		Surface
Direction	m	ft	Surface
11/29	2,300	7,546	Asphalt

Statistics (2024)
- Passengers: 38,103 (▲8.04%)
- Cargo (tonnes): 169.11 (▼17.33%)
- Aircraft movements: 1,010 (▲9.78%)
- Source: DGCA

Mathilda Batlayeri Airport (IATA: SXK, ICAO: WAPS) is a domestic airport serving Saumlaki, the capital and largest town of Tanimbar Islands Regency in the Tanimbar Islands, Maluku, Indonesia. It is named after Mathilda Batlayeri, a heroine from the Tanimbar Islands who was killed in South Kalimantan in 1953 while fighting the Darul Islam rebel movement. The airport commenced operations in May 2014, replacing the former Olilit Airport, which was located near Saumlaki town center but could not be expanded further due to land constraints. Situated in Tumbur Village, Wer Tamrian District, approximately 14 km (8.7 miles) from the Saumlaki town center, the airport serves as the primary gateway to Saumlaki and the Tanimbar Islands. The airport offers scheduled flights to Ambon, the provincial capital and largest city of Maluku, operated by Wings Air, as well as pioneer routes to Larat and Tiakur, operated by Smart Aviation.

== History ==
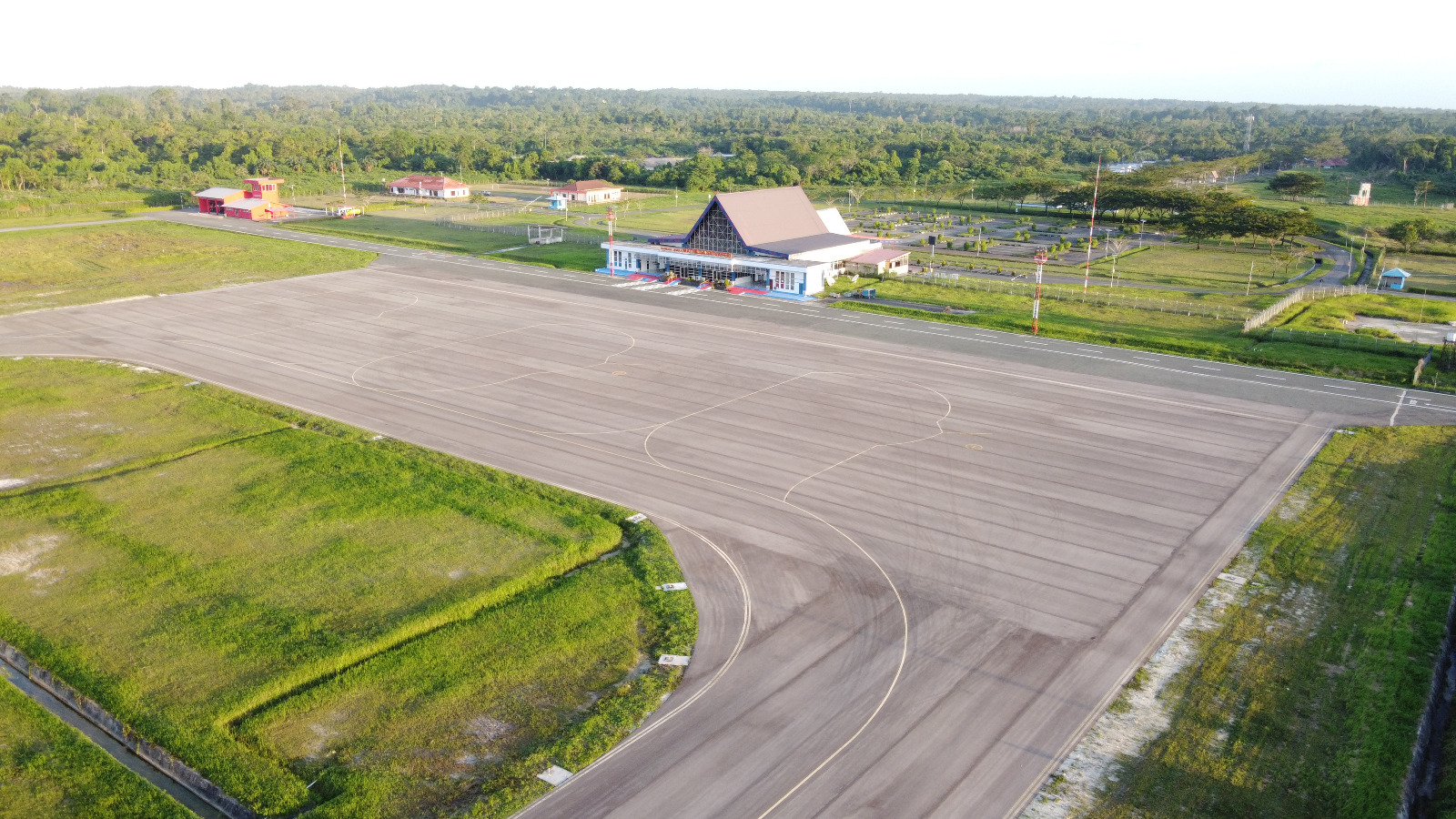
Apron view

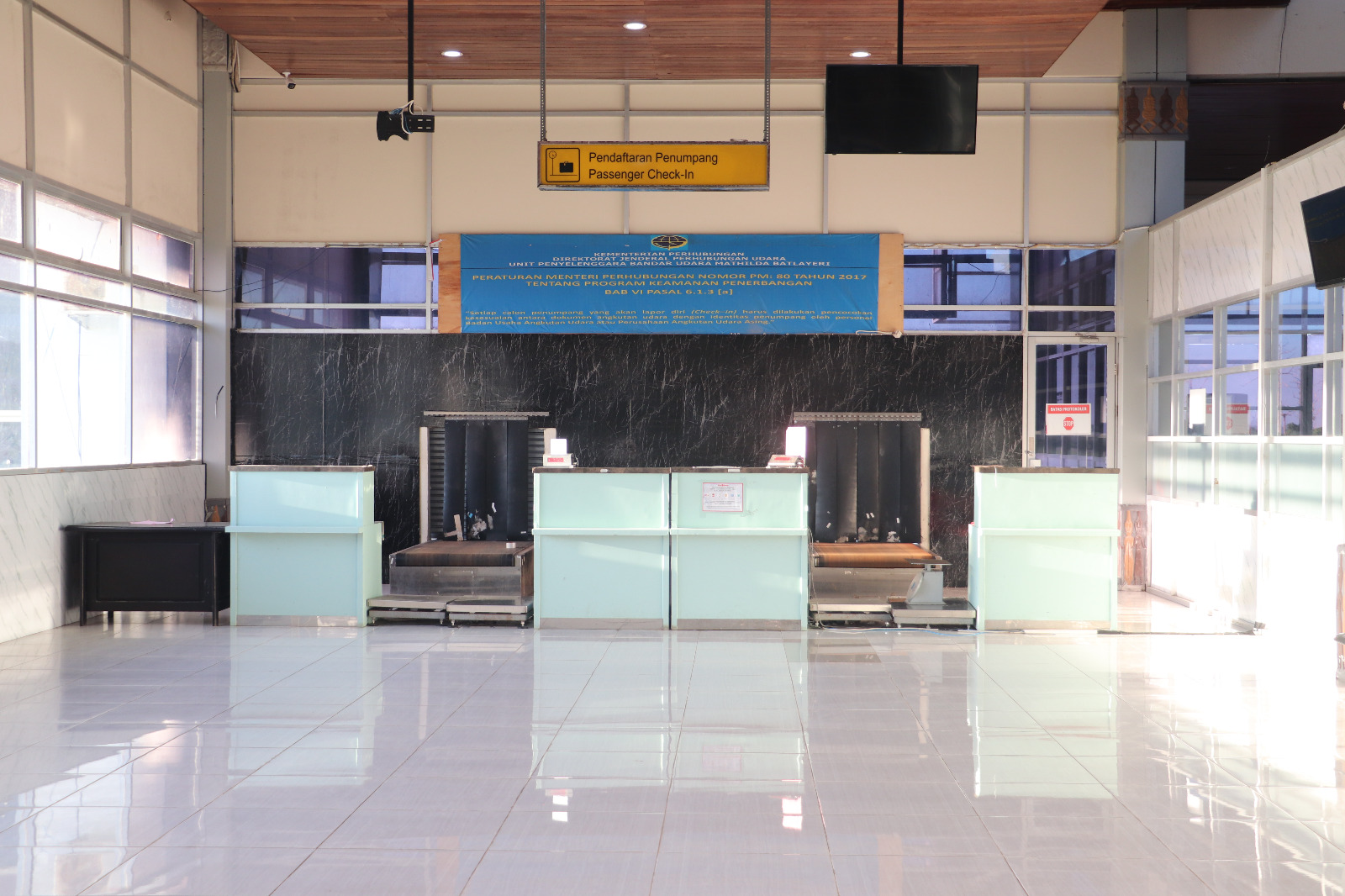
Check-in area

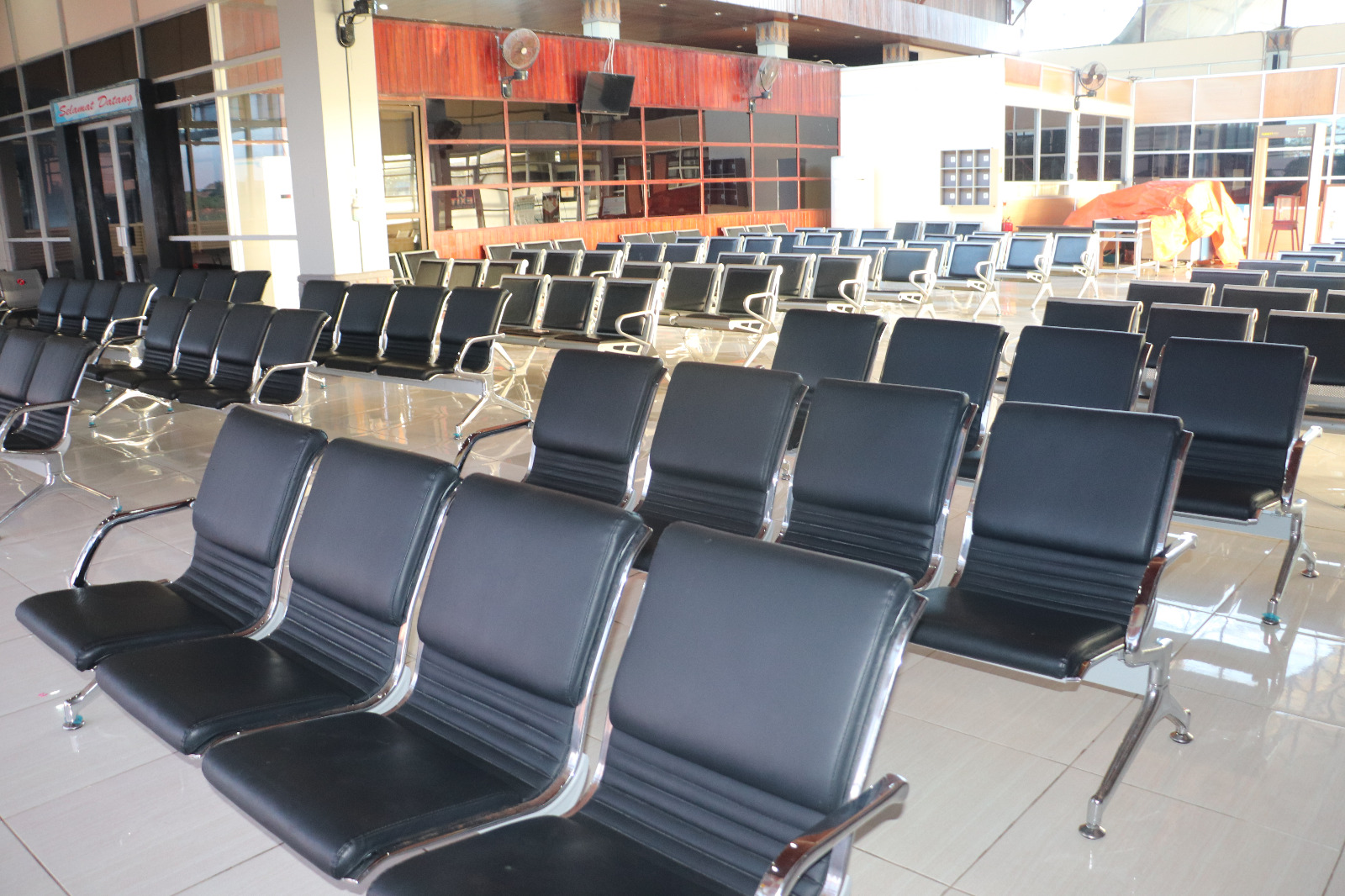
Boarding gate

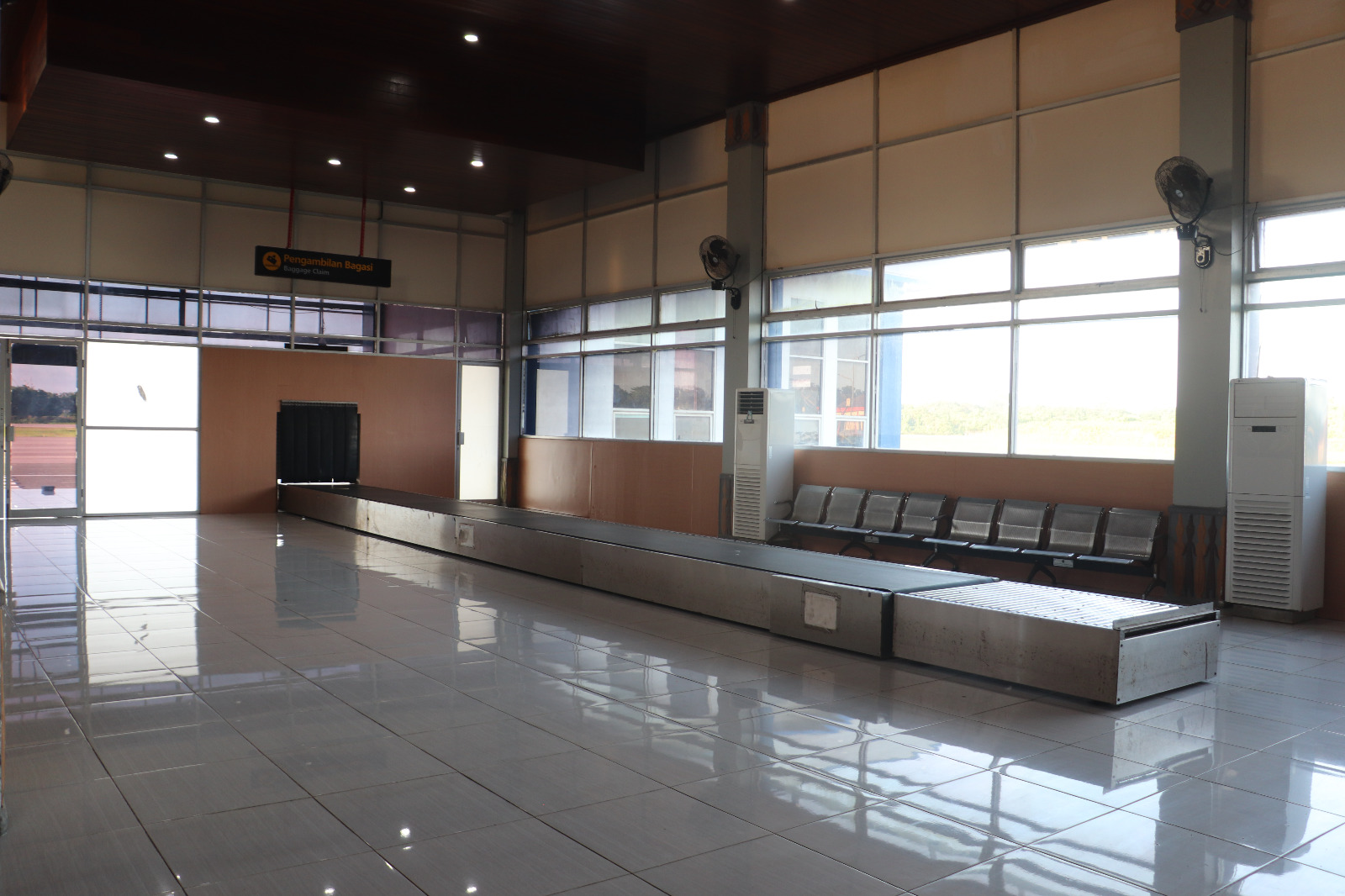
Baggage claim area

Olilit Airport, the former principal airport serving Saumlaki, was deemed no longer viable for continued use. The airport had a runway measuring 900 m × 23 m and a single apron of 60 m × 60 m, both of which could not be expanded due to its location in the middle of Saumlaki, close to residential areas. The runway could not be extended further as it was obstructed by a major road, preventing the airport from accommodating larger aircraft. As a result, the airport could only handle smaller aircraft such as the ATR 42 and the Dornier 228. Consequently, proposals were put forward to construct a new, larger airport to serve Saumlaki and accommodate increasing passenger and air traffic demand.

Construction of the airport began in 2011, funded by the state budget with an allocation of Rp 30 billion, and was completed in 2013. However, due to operational delays, the airport only commenced operations on 9 May 2014. At the time of its inauguration, the airport featured a runway measuring 1,640 m × 30 m, capable of accommodating aircraft such as the ATR 72. Following approval by the Ministry of Transportation, the airport was named after Mathilda Batlayeri, a heroine from the Tanimbar Islands who resisted the Darul Islam rebel movement and was killed during an attack in Kurau, South Kalimantan on 28 September 1953. Her name had been proposed by the Tanimbar Islands Regency Government for official approval. With the commencement of operations at the new airport, all air traffic was transferred from the former Olilit Airport to the new facility. The now-closed Olilit Airport is planned to be redeveloped into a private airfield for Inpex, which is currently developing the Masela LNG block in the Arafura Sea.

The airport is considered strategically important due to its proximity to the borders with Timor-Leste and Australia. Proposals have been made to designate it as an international airport and to open international routes, including services to Darwin in the Northern Territory of Australia. However, these plans have been hindered by limited infrastructure, particularly the runway length.

Tensions have periodically arisen between local residents in the surrounding areas and the airport authority due to disputes over land compensation. On 27 August 2025, residents blocked access to the airport, alleging that the government had failed to fulfill its agreement regarding payment of compensation for their land.

== Facilities and development ==
The airport’s runway was extended from its original dimensions of 1,640 m × 30 m to 1,850 m × 30 m in 2017, and further extended and widened to 2,000 m × 45 m in 2018 to accommodate narrow-body aircraft such as the Boeing 737 and Airbus A320. It was further extended to 2,300 m × 45 m in 2022 to accommodate future operations of wide-body aircraft. To accommodate future international flights as part of plans to designate the airport as an international airport and to serve new routes to destinations such as Australia, Timor-Leste, and the Philippines, the runway is planned to be further extended to 2,500 m × 45 m. The airport is equipped with a single apron measuring 200 m × 75 m and two taxiways, each measuring 110 m × 23 m.

On the landside, the airport has a single passenger terminal measuring 1,440 m². Under the master plan, the terminal will be expanded in phases to 4,000 m², and ultimately to a maximum area of 7,000 m². The government plans to invest up to Rp 100 billion in the development of the airport, covering both airside and landside facilities.

== Airlines and destinations ==
Airlines	Destinations
Smart Aviation	Larat, Tiakur
Wings Air	Ambon

== Statistics ==
Annual passenger numbers and aircraft statistics
Year	Passengers handled	Passenger % change	Cargo (tonnes)	Cargo % change	Aircraft movements	Aircraft % change
2006	4,000	Steady	N/A	Steady	N/A	Steady
2007	13,306	▲232.65	5.18	Steady	674	Steady
2008	12,370	▼7.03	14.40	▲177.99	530	▼21.36
2009	19,692	▲59.19	4.01	▼72.15	879	▲65.85
2010	29,116	▲47.86	9.91	▲147.13	1,162	▲32.20
2011	27,980	▼3.90	17.44	▲75.98	1,255	▲8.00
2012	32,752	▲17.06	46.71	▲167.83	1,307	▲4.14
2013	27,578	▼15.80	12.71	▼72.79	1,555	▲18.97
2014	43,833	▲58.94	34.16	▲168.76	1,623	▲4.37
2015	51,339	▲17.12	58.47	▲71.17	1,244	▼23.35
2016	81,144	▲58.06	30.58	▼47.70	1,944	▲56.27
2017	76,218	▼6.07	40.34	▲31.92	1,960	▲0.82
2018	91,170	▲19.62	204.10	▲405.95	1,992	▲1.63
2019	67,757	▼25.68	142.62	▼30.12	1,516	▼23.90
2020	26,502	▼60.89	64.04	▼55.10	698	▼53.96
2021	35,244	▲32.99	207.75	224.41	876	▲25.50
2022	38,369	▲8.87	245.78	▲18.31	944	▲7.76
2023	35,268	▼8.08	204.56	▼16.77	920	▼2.54
2024	38,103	▲8.04	169.11	▼17.33	1,010	▲9.78
^{Source: DGCA, BPS}

Notes: Data prior to 2014 are derived from records of Olilit Airport.

== Accidents and incidents ==
- On 30 November 2017, Wings Air Flight 1517, an ATR 72-500 en route from Saumlaki to Ambon, returned to the airport shortly after takeoff due to a failure of its second engine. None of the 70 passengers were injured, and the aircraft landed safely.
