= Jos Orno Imsula Airport =

Airport in Indonesia

Jos Orno Imsula Airport Bandara Jos Orno Imsula
- IATA: JIO; ICAO: WAPM

Summary
- Airport type: Public
- Owner: Government of Indonesia
- Operator: UPT Ditjen Hubud
- Serves: Tiakur, Moa Island, Southwest Maluku Regency, Maluku, Indonesia
- Time zone: WITA (UTC+09:00)
- Elevation AMSL: 4 m / 13 ft
- Coordinates: 08°08′26″S 127°54′26″E
- Website: hubud.kemenhub.go.id/upbu/jos-orno-imsula www.instagram.com/bandara.moa/

Map
- Location of airport in Maluku

Runways
Direction	Length		Surface
Direction	m	ft	Surface
10/28	1,400	4,593	Asphalt
- Sources: DGCA

Jos Orno Imsula Airport (Indonesian: Bandar Udara Jos Orno Imsula) (IATA: JIO, ICAO: WAPM) is a domestic airport serving Tiakur, the capital of Southwest Maluku Regency, Maluku, Indonesia. The airport is located on Moa Island and is operated by the Technical Implementation Unit of the Directorate General of Civil Aviation.

== History ==
Construction of the airport began in 2011 with funding from the national government for the runway and terminal facilities. Southwest Maluku Regency Government provide additional funding in 2012 and 2013 to help complete the project.

A test landing was carried out in November 2014. Local officials stated that minor construction issues had been fixed and expected the airport to begin operations by the end of 2014 or early 2015.

On 19 December 2014, Minister of Transportation Ignasius Jonan officially opened Jos Orno Imsula Airport as one of several new airports inaugurated across Indonesia. The airport was named after Jos Orno Imsula, the wife of Southwest Maluku Regent Barnabas Orno, who died in 2013. The name was opposed by some local residents and politicians.

In June 2015, the airport underwent operational trials using Aviastar aircraft. In the same year, the Ministry of Transportation funded a project to extend the runway from 1,150 metres to 1,200 metres and widen it from 23 metres to 30 metres, allowing ATR 42 aircraft to use the airport.

In November 2016, Trigana Air opened scheduled services between Ambon and Tiakur using ATR 42 aircraft.

In January 2021, SAM Air began operating pioneer flights linking Tiakur to Ambon and Saumlaki.

== Airlines and destinations ==
The following destinations are served from Jos Orno Imsula Airport:

Airlines	Destinations
Trigana Air Service	Ambon
SAM Air	Ambon, Kisar, Saumlaki
