= Letti Islands =

Island group within the Maluku Islands, Indonesia

Coordinates: 8.178868°S 127.941284°E

Native name: Kepulauan Letti
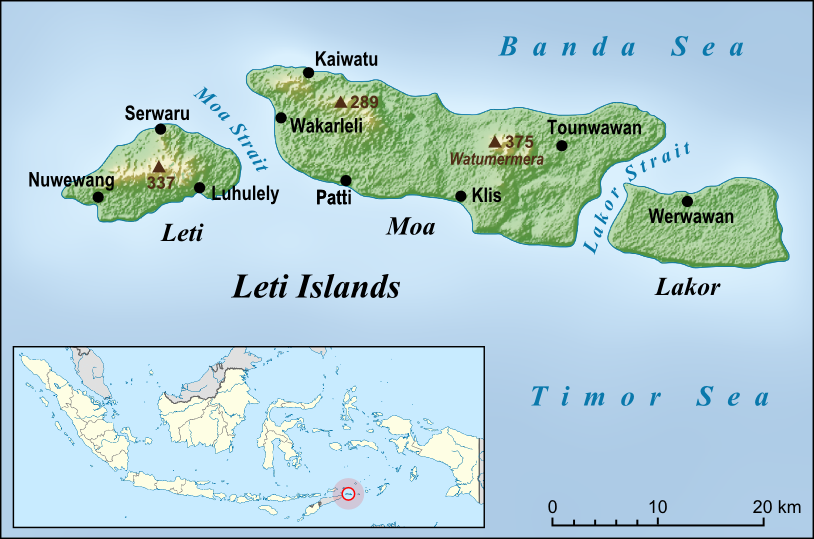
- Letti Islands in the south of the Maluku Islands.

Geography
- Location: South-East Asia
- Archipelago: Maluku Islands
- Major islands: Lakor, Letti, Moa

Administration
- Indonesia
- Province: Maluku
- Regency: Southwest Maluku

Demographics
- Languages: Indonesian, Leti

Additional information
- Time zone: IEST (UTC+09:00)

The Letti Islands (Kepulauan Letti) of Indonesia are part of the Maluku Islands, in southwest Maluku Province. (The spelling Leti Islands is also used sometimes.) They are also called the "Lemola" Archipelago, from the initial two letters of each of the three main islands, Letti, Moa and Lakor; each of the three islands now constitutes a separate administrative district (kecamatan) within the Maluku Barat Daya Regency (Kabupaten Maluku Barat Daya)

The islands cover 564.30 square kilometres (220 sq mi) in area and supported a population of 16,664 at the 2010 Census, which had increased to 26,870 at the 2020 Census; the official estimate as at mid 2025 was 32,867. The most significant town is Tiajur, on Moa. Industries include the cultivation of rice, coconut palms and tobacco, animal husbandry, and fishing.

Letti proper, the westernmost island, covers 90.10 km^{2} and had a population of 9,370 in mid 2025. The island is a triangular mountain ridge, subtended by Koli Besar mountain in the east and the Rapat mountains in the west.

Moa, the central and largest island, covers 360.31 km^{2} and had a population of 20,606 in mid 2025. The town (kelurahan) of Tiakur is the main town for the Regency; it has an area of 3.2 km^{2} and had a population of 5,821 as at mid 2024. The seven villages (desa) in the rest of the island are Wakarleli, Tounwawan, Klis, Kaiwatu, Werwaru, Patti and Moain. Tounwawan in the east of the island contains the district administrative centre. Lakor, the easternmost island, covers 112.60 km^{2} and had a population of 2,881 in mid 2025.

The Letti Islands are part of the Banda Sea Islands moist deciduous forests ecoregion.

== Languages ==
The Leti language, a member of the Austronesian languages group, is spoken on Letti islands.

== Administration ==
The Letti Islands form the Letti, Lakor and Moa Lakor districts of the Southwest Maluku Regency within Maluku Province.

The office of the district head (camat) of Letti is located in Serwaru, on the northern coast of Letti. The office of the camat of Moa Lakor is located in Weet on Moa. The office of the camat of Lakor is located in Wewawan on Lakor.

== See also ==
- List of islands of Indonesia
- Maluku Islands
- Maluku (province)
- Yene
