= Yene =

Ancestor spirit dolls in the Maluku Islands of Indonesia

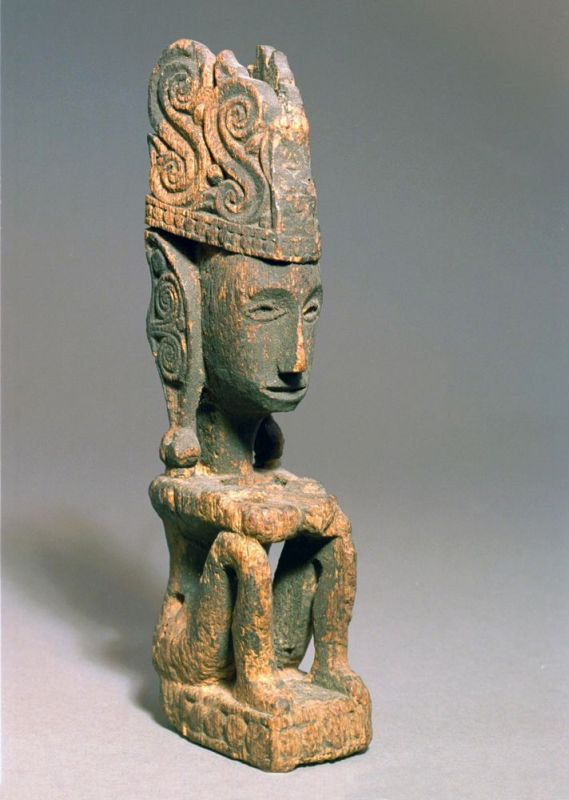
A yene, a Leti Island statue of the ancestor. The seated posture of the statue indicates that it is a spirit vessel for the male ancestor.

Yene are small wooden statues found throughout the Leti Islands, in the southeastern part of the Maluku archipelago in eastern Indonesia. Yene are believed to act as a vessel where the ancestor spirit would reside temporarily before departing to the land of the dead.

The Leti's religious beliefs are based upon a male god being the sun and a female god being earth. There were many rituals based on their belief in gods such as fertility. There are even massive sculptures in the middle of their village. As a result of this the Leti people have continued this into much smaller sculptures of their ancestors and their spirits.

== Form ==
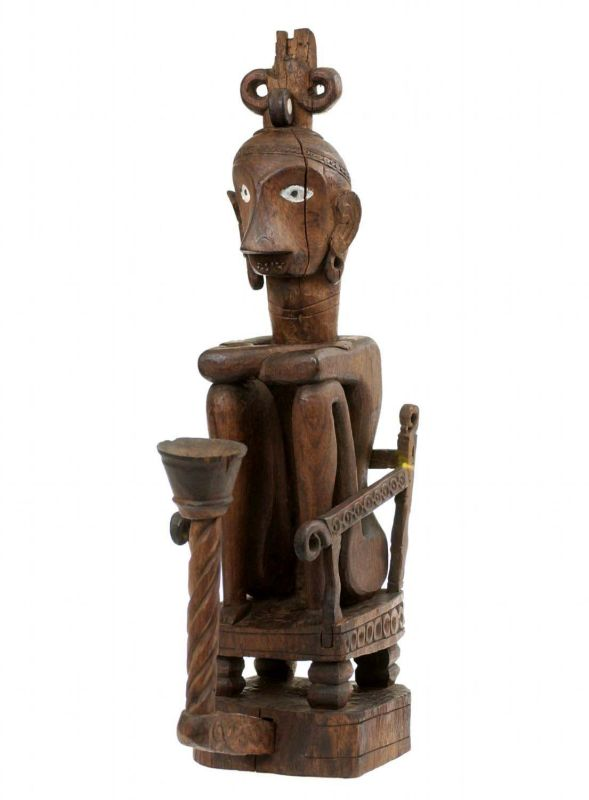
This yene, seated on a western-style chair, may have indicated that the owner had converted to Christianity after a contact with the Westerners.

Three kinds of statues are found throughout the Maluku Islands: Statues of ancestors; statues of progenitors (linked to the origin and foundation of the descendants), and statues of the cosmos (heaven and earth) represented as male and female, respectively.

In the Leti Islands, yene are small-sized statues of the ancestors, usually depicted seated. The statues represent deceased family members. The posture of the yene indicates the gender of the deceased. Male ancestors are shown in a squatting position, while females are shown with crossed-legs. Yene statues have been recorded since the 17th century, with some showing signs of contact with the west. Some male ancestors statues show a squatting figure on top of a western-style chair, which may indicate that the deceased has been converted to Christianity.

At places where a caste system existed, leti statues also indicate the rank of the deceased. Members of the highest caste are represented with jewelry, such as earrings and headgear that look like bishops' mitres. Lower caste yene are usually represented without jewelry or complex ornaments. Feather ornamentation indicates the deceased was a warrior.

== Function ==
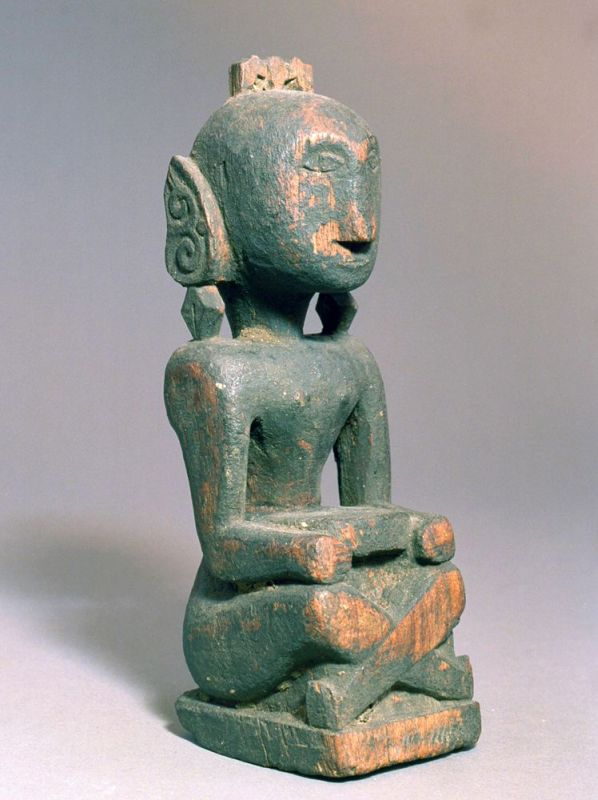
A yene of a female ancestor, depicted with the legs crossed.

The yene functioned as a sort of temporary vessel for the spirit of the deceased before they depart to the land of the dead. The Leti Islanders believed that a human has both a physical body and an abstract "shadow", somewhat comparable to a soul or mind. The "shadow" is believed to persist even after death. After death, his or her "shadow" wanders for a few days in the village before it leaves for the land of the dead, which is said to be situated on an uninhabited island, such as a reef or a cape, not far from the world of the living.

The yene sculpture allowed the relatives of the departed to communicate with the departed spirit, either for consultation on important matters or to be given offerings during annual ceremonies. The Leti society are strongly dependent on the ancestor spirits for many things, such as fertility. Generally the yene statues are offered sirih and pinang. Sometimes palm wine is combined with the offering.

Yene sculptures are arranged in the attic of house of Leti Islanders. The spirits are thought to reach the attic through specially-fitted hatches in the facade.

=== Styles ===
Aside from sitting down on the ground or sitting on a stool and being differentiated by their gender, yene statues can differ in other ways. One way is how they are decorated. They can be decorated in many different ways. For example some statues have been stylized with crocodiles all around, below above and on top of their heads. Another example in which the yene statues were stylized was the statues eating maize. Another way are the statues being a hybrid between an animal, typically a bird from the statues having a beak. Other ways they are decorated smaller menial things or things that are too hard to depict such as the pictures shown. Yene statues are often holding objects which are hypothesized to be the object that the statues representative would use depending on their status or role in their society.

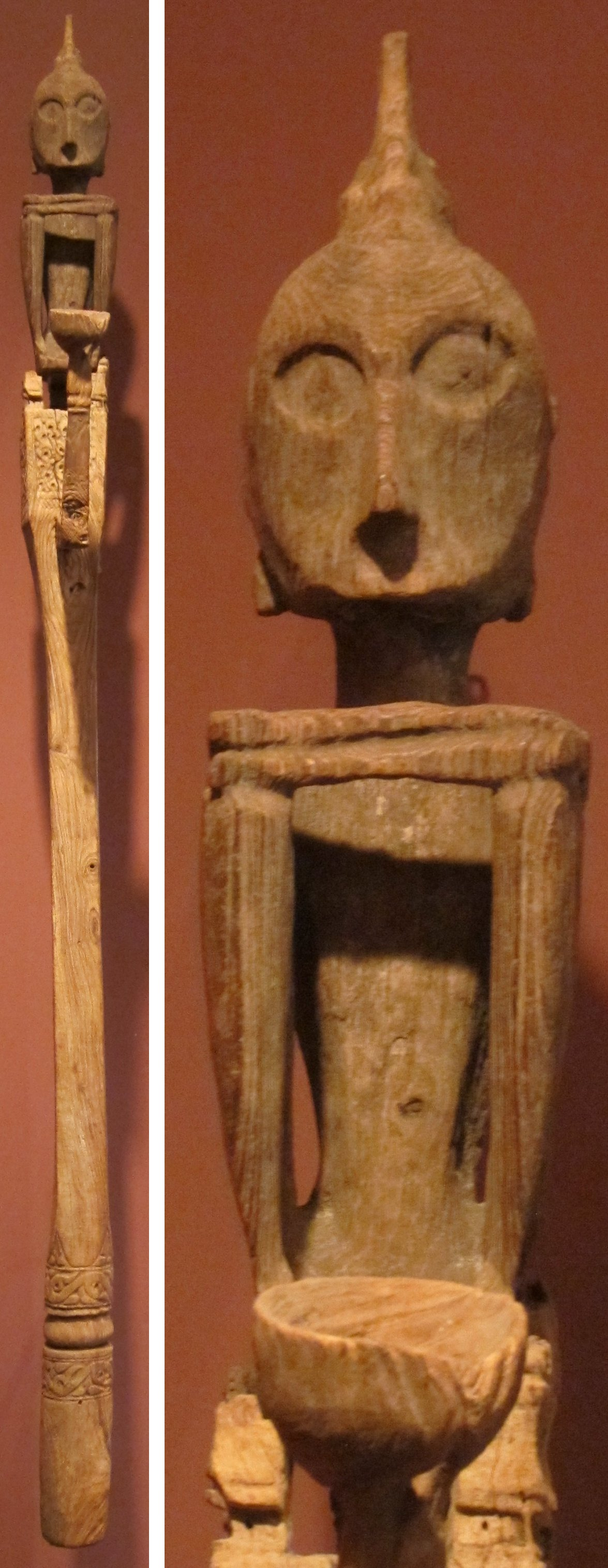
Urnuse, Southeast Moluccas, Leti Island, Honolulu Museum of Art

One unique style of these statues is a handheld device with the statue at the top that is supposed to be Urnuse, the founding village ancestor.

== Sources ==
- de Jonge, Nico; van Dijk, Toos (1995). Vergeten eilanden : kunst & cultuur van de Zuidoost-Molukken. Amsterdam: Periplus. ISBN 9789054500025.

Wilkenson, Fred (2013). Indonesian Ethnic and Tribal Art Collection. Nonsuch Art.
