= Mulika Lodge Airport =

Airport in Kenya

- IATA: JJM; ICAO: HKMK

Summary
- Airport type: Public, Civilian
- Owner: Kenya Airports Authority
- Serves: Meru, Kenya
- Location: Meru National Park, Kenya
- Elevation AMSL: 2,230 ft / 680 m
- Coordinates: 00°09′54″N 38°11′42″E

Map
- Location of Mulika Lodge Airport in Kenya; Placement on map is approximate

Runways
Direction	Length		Surface
Direction	ft	m	Surface
01/19	3,281	1,000	Asphalt partial
11/29	1,020	310	Unpaved

Mulika Lodge Airport (IATA: JJM, ICAO: HKMK) is an airport in Meru National Park, in Meru County, Kenya.

== Location ==
By air, Mulika Lodge Airport lies approximately 220 kilometres (140 mi) northeast of Nairobi International Airport, Kenya's largest civilian airport.

== Overview ==
Mulika Lodge Airport is a small civilian airport, serving Meru National Park and the neighboring town of Meru. Situated at 680 metres (2,230 ft) above sea level, the airport has one asphalt runway measuring 3,281 feet (1,000 m) in length.

== Scheduled airlines and destinations ==
Airlines	Destinations
Airkenya Express	Nairobi–Wilson

== See also ==
- Kenya Airports Authority
- Kenya Civil Aviation Authority
- List of airports in Kenya
