= Moa (island) =

Island in Maluku, Indonesia

Coordinates: 8.16667°S 127.93333°E

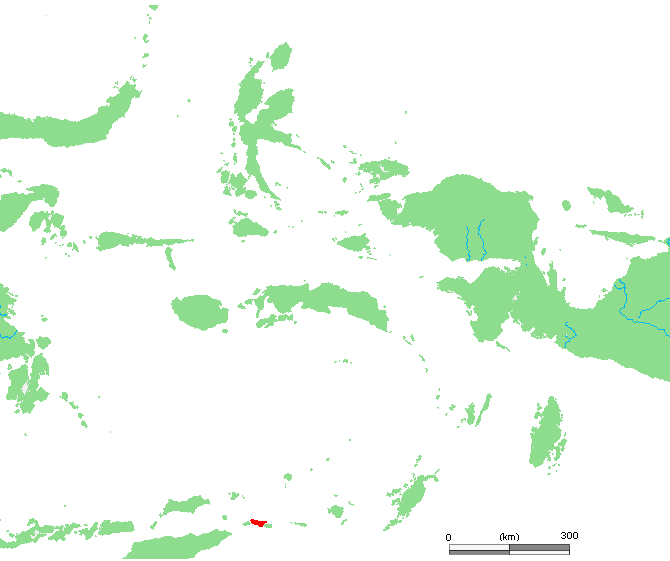
Map of Maluku archipelago. Moa is located in the southern part of the archipelago.

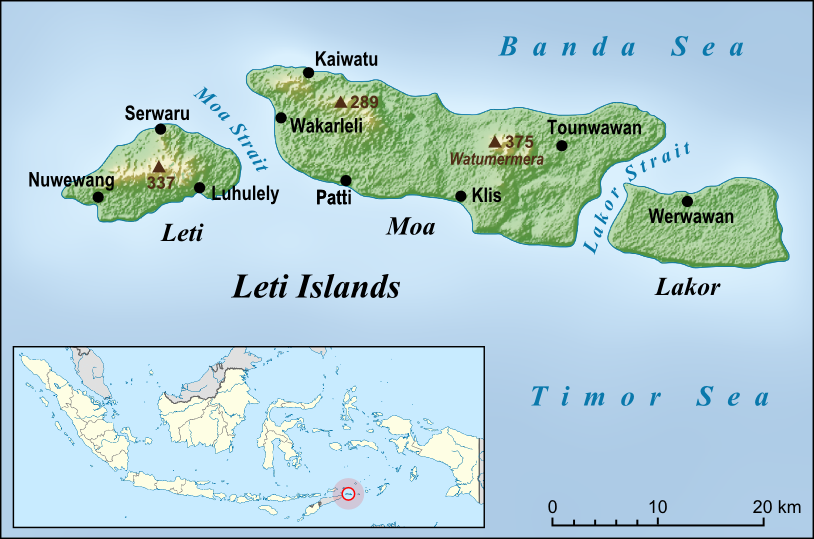

Moa is an Indonesian island, at the center of the Leti Islands, and one of the 92 officially listed outlying islands of Indonesia. Moa is located in southwest Maluku province. The main town is Tiakur on the west coast of the island, which serves as the purpose-built administrative centre for Southwest Maluku Regency. However, the administrative centre for Moa Island (kecamatan Moa Lakor) is Weet on the northeast coast.

The Leti language, a member of Austronesian languages is spoken on Moa.

== See also ==
- List of islands of Indonesia
- Maluku Islands
- Maluku (province)

== Transportation ==
The island is served by the Jos Orno Imsula Airport (IATA: JIO).
