= Tiakur =

- Town
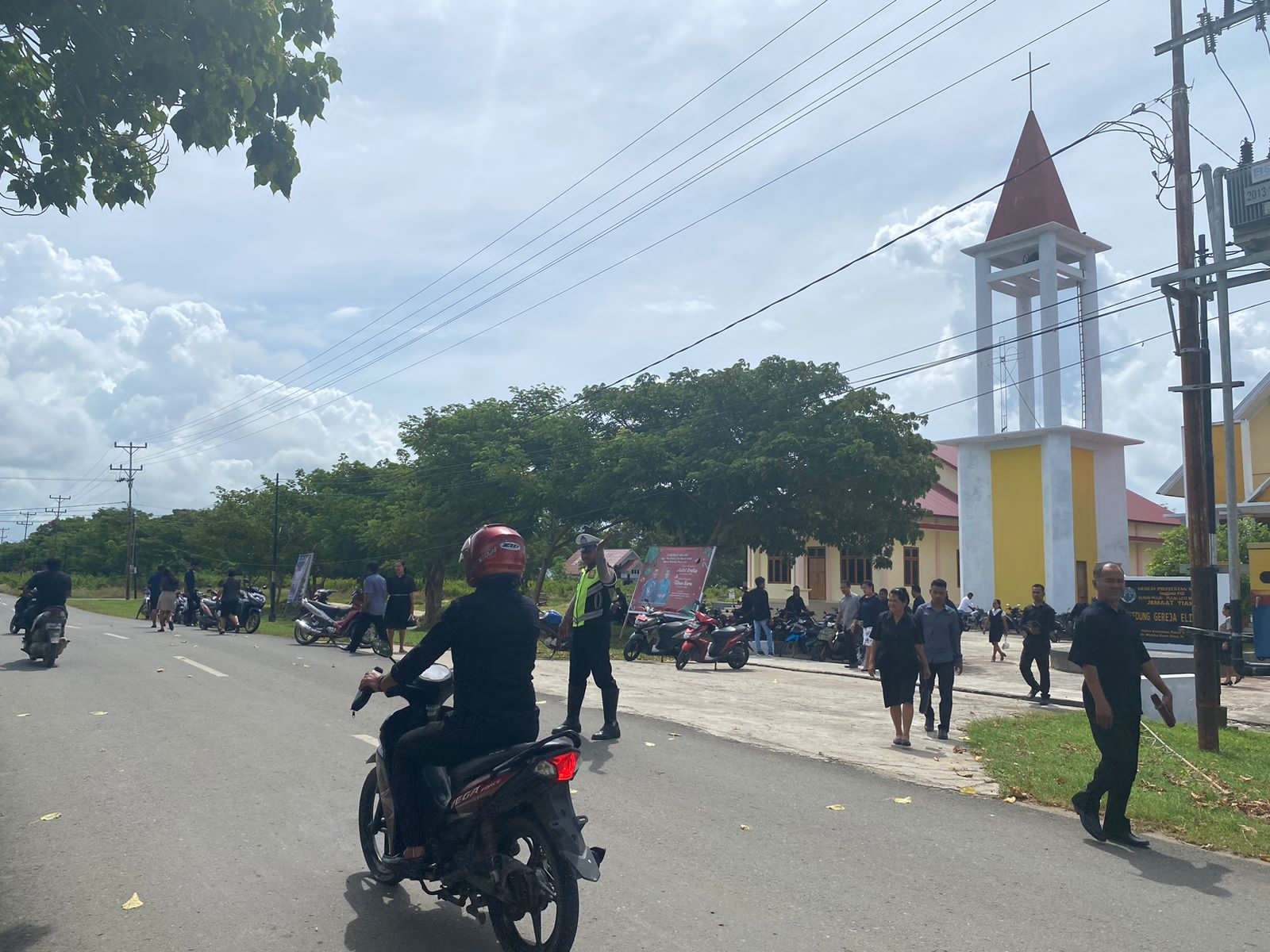
- Scene of a street in Tiakur, afront a church
- Interactive map of Tiakur
- Coordinates: 08°08′59″S 127°48′19″E
- Country: Indonesia
- Province: Maluku
- Regency: Southwest Maluku Regency
- District: Moa District
- Established: 2008

Area
  - Total: 3.50 km^{2} (1.35 sq mi)

Population
  - Total: 4,227
- Time zone: UTC+9 (IEST)
- Postcode: 97442

Tiakur is a kelurahan and the regency seat of Southwest Maluku Regency in Maluku, Indonesia. The town was purposely built as the capital of the Southwest Maluku Regency following its creation in 2008. It was created as the result of a political debate during the creation of the regency, although smaller than the larger and more developed town of the regency, Wonreli on Kisar Island. The town is located mainly within the boundaries of Tiakur kelurahan, with a population of 4,227 as of 2022.

== History ==
Before the town was built, Moa Island was relatively underdeveloped and sparsely populated. The town was a result of years of political debates among the officials and later division among inhabitants of the region who initiated the creation of Southwest Maluku Regency. The idea of new town being built for the regency seat was first spouted on 6 December 2001, during the Southwest Autonomy Council's first congress. The Southwest Autonomy Council was created by several figures from the region after they were dissatisfied with the perceived domination of Tanimbar Islanders in politics, with the goal of creating their own new regency. The council however, was divided into two factions, with representatives from the Southernmost Islands District wanting Wonreli to be the capital of the new regency, while the other two districts, Babar Islands and Leti Moa Lakor, wanted the capital to be in Moa Island. To finalize the formation of the regency, the council decided to postpone the matter of the capital until much later.

On 2004, the parliament of the parent regency, Southeast West Maluku Regency, released Decree No.4/2004, affirming that the capital would be in Wonreli, Kisar Island. However, during the creation of the regency in 2008, the provincial government of Maluku and the Southeast West Maluku Regency supported Moa Island as the new location of the capital. This led to condemnation by the King of Kisar, John Baker, who argued that the new town and Moa Island were too underdeveloped, and the decision contradicts the decree from 2004. The head of the committee, Oyang Orlando Petrus, accused the governments of Southeast West Maluku Regency and Maluku province of lying to the residents. The first stone for the town was laid in November 2008, and the construction of the town began with 15 billion Indonesian Rupiah allocated for the development of the basic services in the town. The move from the temporary seat in Wonreli was delayed until 2012, with several protests from both sides occurring during the year, resulting in the port in Kisar being temporarily taken over and barricaded by the Wonreli faction. Students from the region protested in front of the Maluku governor office, accusing "local elites" to be purposely delaying the move of the capital from Wonreli to Tiakur. The government seat was finally moved to Tiakur on 26 April 2012, and inaugurated on 26 November 2012 during the term of Barnabas Orno, who previously was the vice-regent of Southeast West Maluku, and endorsed Tiakur to be the capital.

== Geography ==
Tiakur is located on Moa Island, and constitutes an administrative kelurahan, geographically forming an enclave within the Wakarleli desa (administrative village); and is situated in the Moa District, which encompasses the entire island. Tiakur has the smallest land area compared to other administrative villages in the district, at just 3.50 km^{2}.

== Economy ==
The town is the center of infrastructure and economic activities on Moa Island. The town is the location of the two only state-owned banks in the district, the only market building in the district, as well as 12 out of the 15 registered restaurants in the district. The island has a total cultivated land area of 20 ha with results of 786 quintals of agricultural products. Other than vegetables such as water spinach, the island also produces tangerines, mangoes, papaya, and breadfruit.

For tourism, Tiakur serves as the main location for accommodation, which has three hotels as of 2023. However, much of the tourism industry is yet to be developed.

== Infrastructure ==
=== Transportation ===
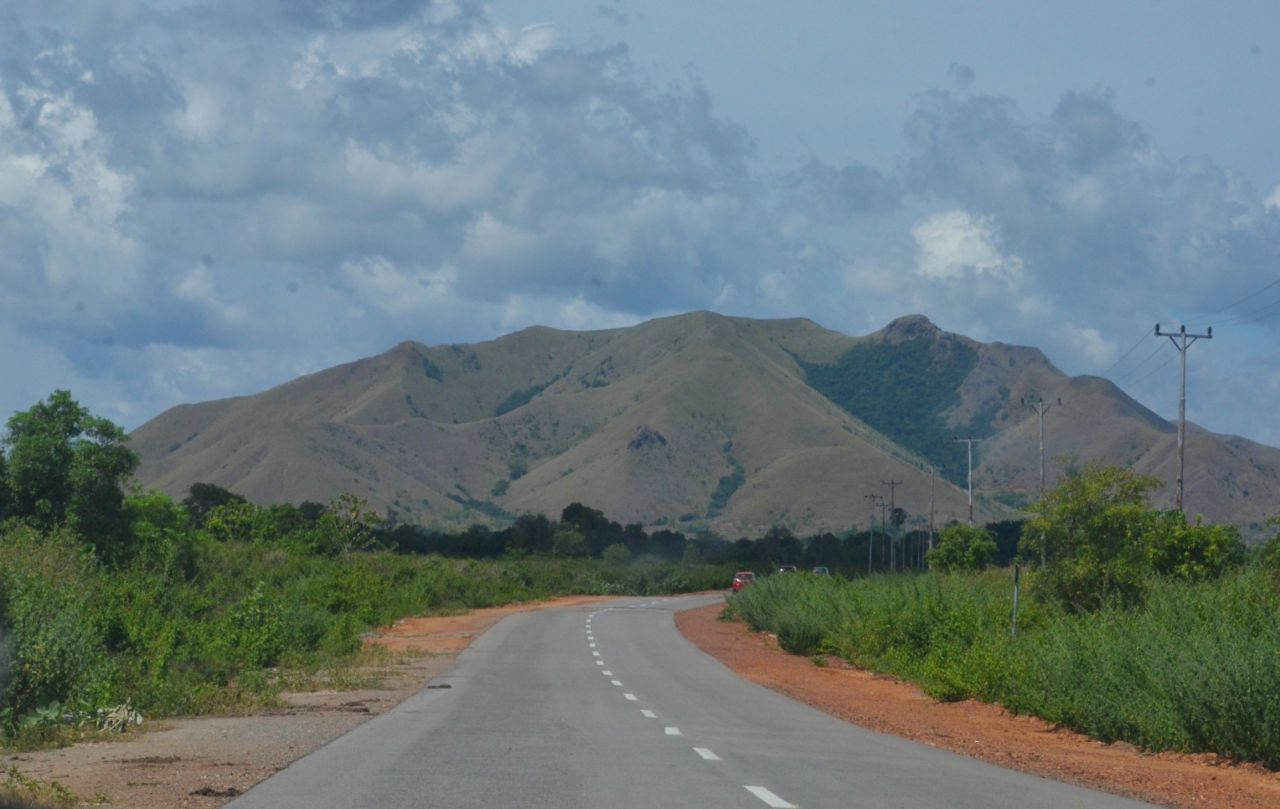
Trans Moa Road connecting Tiakur and Weet

The town is served by Jos Orno Imsula Airport, which is the sole airport in Moa Island. It is also one of two airports in the regency, the other one, John Beker Airport, is located in Kisar Island. The airport sees regular flights to Ambon city, Kisar Island, and other towns such as Saumlaki. The Trans Moa Road connects the town to the rest of the island, mainly from Tiakur to Weet, which spans 27.95 kilometers. The roads are mostly paved with asphalt, and considered in good condition by Statistics Indonesia, and were improved in 2018. A bus service was launched in 2019, covering the island, including the town, but is mainly used for school students.

The town's only ferry port was still under construction as of 2021, and the construction was halted in the same year due to problems with the land acquisition. Another port, mainly for fisheries and logistics, is expected to be constructed in early 2023, and finished in 2024.

=== Healthcare ===
The town only has one general hospital, Tiakur Regional Hospital, which is public and classified by the Ministry of Health as D-class. The hospital experienced a shortage of specialist doctors in September 2021, due to many doctors leaving after their contracts expired. The hospital has low accreditation, which is cited as one of the reasons it has difficulties acquiring healthcare workers, including specialist doctors. The town also operated a mobile hospital for its neighbouring locations, as well as various puskesmas and two registered pharmacies.

=== Education ===
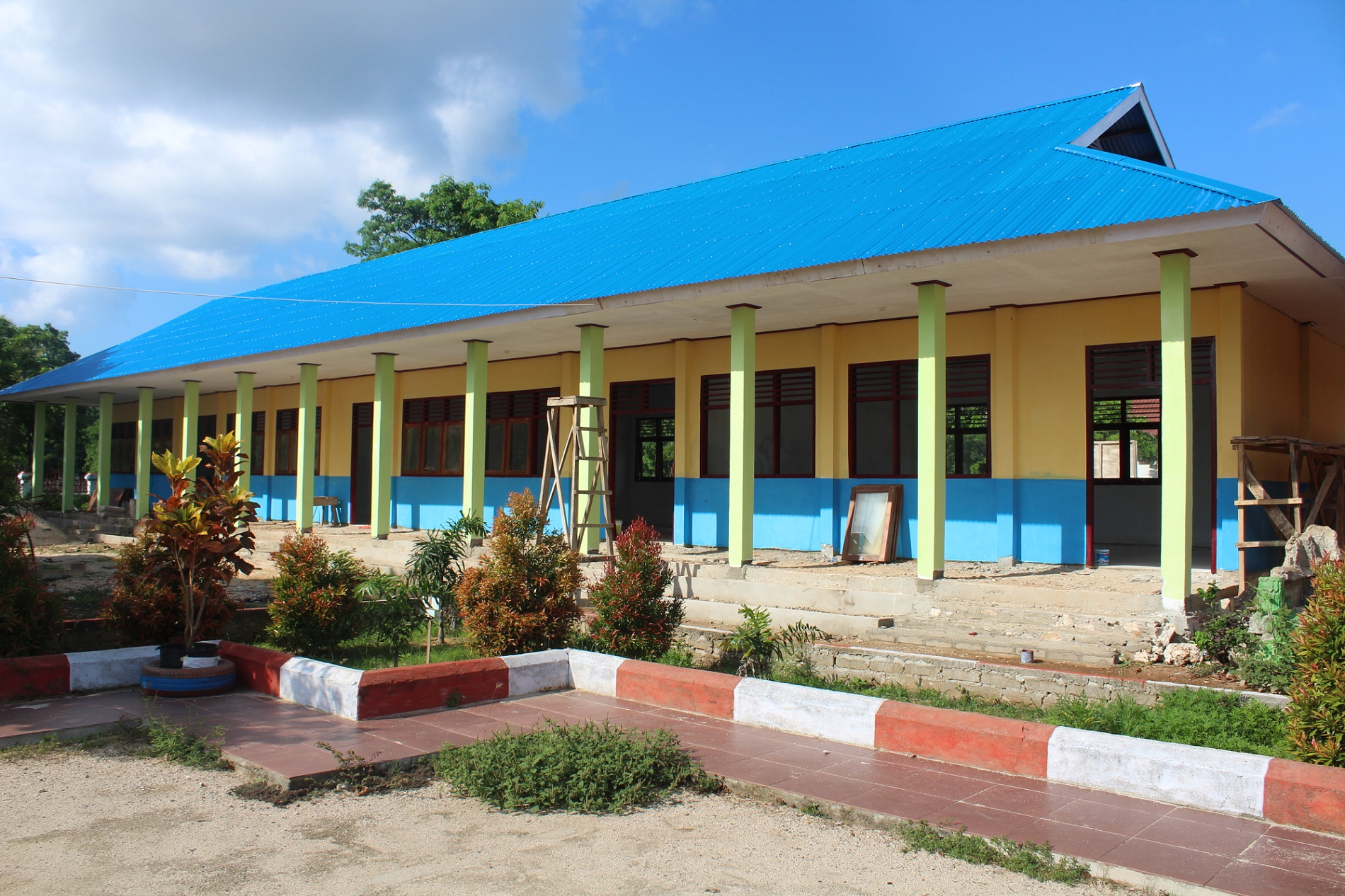
A school building under construction in Tiakur

According to Statistics Indonesia, in 2022, the town has 11 education institutions, ranging from kindergartens to tertiary education. Tiakur has one of three campuses of the University of Pattimura.

=== Others ===
The town's electricity is served by Perusahaan Listrik Negara, using mainly diesel generators and 21.5 kilometer power transmission lines across the island, built in 2012. The town has 10 Protestant churches, one Catholic church, and one mosque, as of 2021. The town has two base transceiver stations to serve telecommunication in the region, with 4G access.
