= Southwest Maluku Regency =

Regency in Maluku, Indonesia

Southwest Maluku Regency Kabupaten Maluku Barat Daya
- Regency
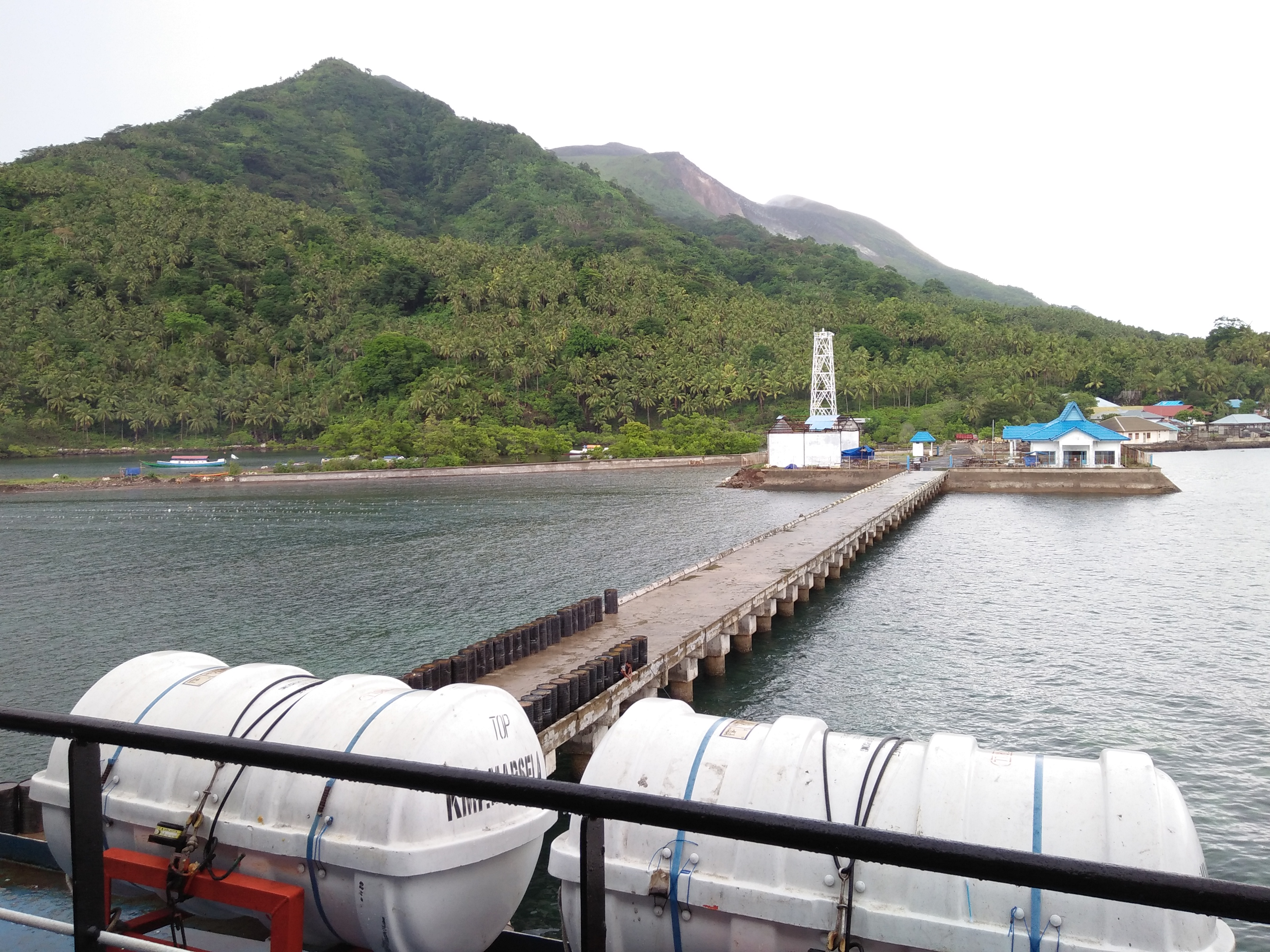
- Damer volcanic island

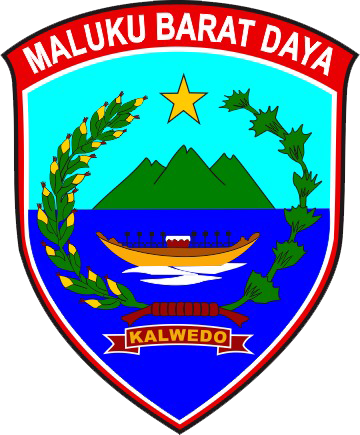
- Coat of arms
- Motto: Kalwedo
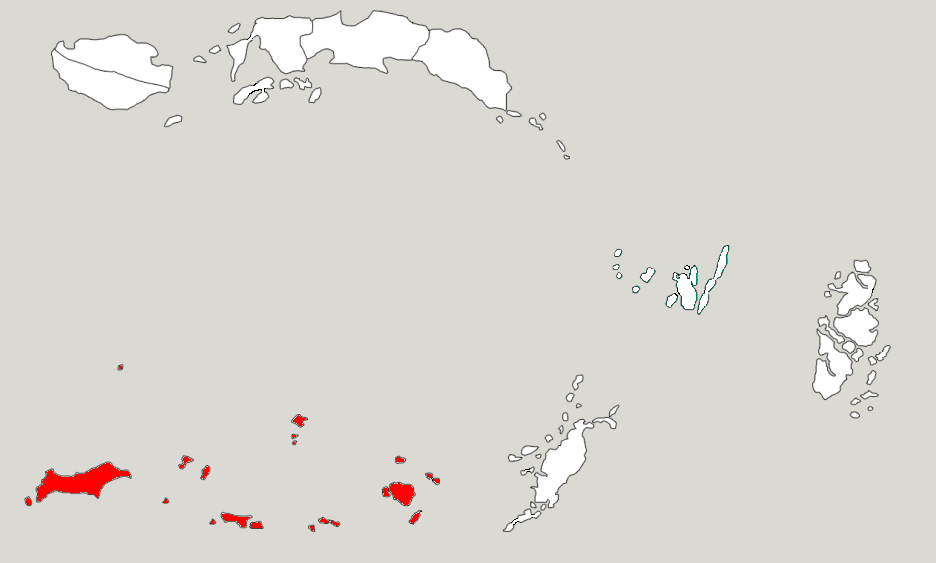
- Location within Maluku

- Location in Maluku and Indonesia Southwest Maluku Regency (Indonesia)
- Coordinates: 8°13′S 128°11′E
- Country: Indonesia
- Province: Maluku
- Capital: Tiakur

Government
  - Regent: Benyamin Thomas Noach
  - Vice Regent: Agustinus Lekwardai Kilikily

Area
  - Total: 4,581.06 km^{2} (1,768.76 sq mi)

Population (mid 2025 estimate)
  - Total: 98,067
  - Density: 21.407/km^{2} (55.444/sq mi)
- Time zone: UTC+9 (IEST)
- Area code: (+62) 918
- Website: malukubaratdayakab.go.id

Southwest Maluku Regency (Indonesian: Kabupaten Maluku Barat Daya; Indonesian pronunciation: [kabuˌpat̪ɛn maˌluku ˌbarat̪̚ ˈdaja]) is a regency of Maluku Province, Indonesia. Geographically it forms the most eastern portion of the Lesser Sunda Islands, although it has never been administratively included with them, and politically has always comprised a part of the Maluku Province. It comprises a number of islands and island groups in the south of the province, including (running from west to east) Lirang Island, Wetar Island (with almost half of the total land area of the regency), Kisar Island, Romang Island, the Letti Islands, the Damer Islands, the Sermata Islands (formerly called Mdona Hyera) and the Babar Islands. The total land area is 4,581.06 km^{2}, and the population was 70,714 at the 2010 Census and 81,928 at the 2020 Census; the official estimate as at mid 2025 was 98,067 (comprising 49,905 males and 48,162 females), and is projected to reach 100,000 during 2026.

The administrative centre lies at Tiakur on Moa Island (in the Letti Islands), but the largest town is Wonreli (on Kisar Island). These islands were originally part of Maluku Tenggara Regency within Maluku, and then from 4 October 1999 part of Maluku Tenggara Barat Regency when that was created, but from 24 June 2008 became a separate regency within Maluku.

== Administrative districts ==
As at 2010 the Southwest Maluku Regency was administratively composed of eight districts (kecamatan). But by 2015 the number of districts had increased to seventeen by the splitting of existing districts, although by 2023 the names of several of these districts had been altered; Pulau Pulau Wetar (the Wetar Islands) has been divided into four districts - Wetar (now Wetar Selatan or South Wetar), Wetar Barat (West Wetar), Wetar Timur (East Wetar) and Wetar Utara (North Wetar); the other six newly created districts are Dawelor Dawera and Pulau Masela (Masela Island) formed from parts of Babar Timur District, Kepulauan Roma (Romang Islands) and Kisar Utara (North Kisar) formed from parts of Pulau Pulau Terselatan District (itself now renamed Kisar Selatan), Pulau Lakor (Lakor Island) formed from part of Moa Lakor District (itself now renamed Moa District), and Pulau Wetang (Wetang Island) formed from part of Pulau Pulau Babar District (itself now renamed Babar Barat or West Babar District).

The districts are formally grouped into three archipelagoes - the Terselatan Group (including Wetar, as well as Kisar and Romang Islands), the Lemola Group (Letti, Moa and Lakor) and the Babar Group (including Damer Island and the Sermata Islands). The areas (in km^{2}) and the populations at the 2010 census and 2020 census, together with the official estimates as at mid 2025, are listed below. The table also includes the locations of the district administrative centres, the number of administrative villages in each district (totaling 117 rural desa and 1 urban kelurahan - the latter being Tiakur on Moa Island), and its post code.

Kode Wilayah	Name of district (kecamatan)	comprising	Area in km^{2}	Pop'n census 2010	Pop'n census 2020	Pop'n estimate mid 2025	Admin centre	No. of Villages	Post Code
81.08.06	Wetar Selatan	southern part of Wetar Island	1,157.60	7,916	2,359	2,941	Ilwaki	6	97446
81.08.14	Wetar Barat	western part of Wetar Island, plus Lirang Island, and other islands west of Wetar	345.70	^{(a)}	2,181	2,884	Ustutun	5	97447
81.08.13	Wetar Utara	northern part of Wetar Island, plus Reong Island	677.60	^{(a)}	2,365	3,571	Lurang	6	97449
81.08.15	Wetar Timur	eastern part of Wetar Island	470.90	^{(a)}	1,717	2,272	Arwala	6	97448
81.08.07	Kisar Selatan	southern part of Kisar Island	65.40	17,899	10,027	11,022	Wonreli	6	97445
81.08.17	Kisar Utara	northern part of Kisar Island	18.59	^{(b)}	3,185	3,368	Putihair Timur	3	97441
81.08.16	Kepulauan Roma	Romang Islands	194.30	^{(b)}	4,146	4,692	Rumkuda	3	97440
	Totals for Terselatan Group		2,930.09	25,815	25,980	30,750		35	
81.08.08	Letti	Leti Island	90.10	7,526	8,060	9,370	Serwaru	7	97444
81.08.01	Moa	Moa Island	361.60	9,138	16,294	20,606	Weet	8	97442
81.08.12	Lakor	Lakor Island	112.60	^{(c)}	2,516	2,891	Wewawan	5	97443
	Totals for Lemola Group		564.30	16,664	26,870	32,867		20	
81.08.02	Damer	Damer Island, plus uninhabited Nus Leur, Terbang Utara and Terbang Selatan	201.80	5,560	5,718	6,565	Wulur	7	97652^{(d)}
81.08.03	Luang Sermata	Sermata Islands	125.50	5,269	5,116	6,741	Lelang	11	97652
81.08.04	Babar Barat	Babar Island (western half), plus Dai Island	359.70	7,752	6,491	7,413	Tepa	9	97451
81.08.05	Babar Timur	Babar Island (eastern half)	281.30	9,654	6,012	6,996	Letwurung	11	97654
81.08.09	Pulau Masela	Masela Island	46.71	^{(e)}	2,322	2,729	Latalola Besar	11	97653
81.08.10	Dawelor Dawera	Dawelor Island and Dawera Island	27.06	^{(e)}	1,294	1,516	Watuwey	6	97651
81.08.11	Pulau Wetang	Wetang Island	44.60	^{(f)}	2,125	2,490	Rumah Lewang Besar	8	97652
	Totals for Babar Group		1,086.67	28,235	29,078	34,450		63	

Notes:
(a) the 2010 populations for the four districts which comprised Pulau Pulau Wetar District are listed under Wetar Selatan District.
(b) the 2010 populations of Kisar Utara and Kepulauan Roma Districts are included under the figure for Kisar Selatan District (formerly called Pulau Pulau Terselatan District), from which they were split off.
(c) the 2010 population of Lakor District is included in the figure for Moa District, from which it was split off.
(d) except for Batumerah desa (in the west of the island), which has a postcode of 97128.
(e) the 2010 populations of Pulau Masela and Daweloor Dawera Districts are included under the figure for Babar Timur District, from which they were split off.
(f) the 2010 population of Pulau Wetang District is included in the figure for Babar Barat District (formerly called Pulau Pulau Babar District), from which it was split off.
