= Forced conversion =

Adoption of a different religion or irreligion under duress

Forced conversion is the adoption of a religion or irreligion under duress. Someone who has been forced to convert to a different religion or irreligion may continue, covertly, to adhere to the beliefs and practices which were originally held, while outwardly behaving as a convert. Crypto-Jews, Crypto-Christians, Crypto-Muslims, Crypto-Hindus and Crypto-Pagans are historical examples of the latter.

== Religion and proselytization ==
The religions of the world are divided into two groups: those that actively seek new followers (missionary religions) and those that do not (non-missionary religions). This classification dates back to a lecture given by Max Müller in 1873, and is based on whether or not a religion seeks to gain new converts. The three main religions classified as missionary religions are Christianity, Islam, and Buddhism, while the non-missionary religions include Judaism, Hinduism, and Zoroastrianism. Other religions, such as Primal Religions, Confucianism, and Taoism, may also be considered non-missionary religions.

== Religion and power ==
In general, anthropologists have shown that the relationship between religion and politics is complex, especially when it is viewed over the expanse of human history.

While religious leaders and the state generally have different aims, both are concerned about power and order; both use reason and emotion to motivate behavior. Throughout history, leaders of religious and political institutions have cooperated, opposed one another, and/or attempted to co-opt each other, for purposes which are both noble and base, and they have implemented programs with a wide range of driving values, from compassion, which is aimed at alleviating current suffering, to brutal change, which is aimed at achieving long-term goals, for the benefit of groups which have ranged from small cliques to all of humanity. The relationship is far from simple. But religion has frequently been used in a coercive manner, and it has also used coercion.

== Buddhism ==
People may express their faith through the act of taking refuge, and conversions usually require people to recite their acceptance of the Triple Gems of Buddhism. However, they may always practice Buddhism without fully abandoning their own religion. According to Chin Human Rights Organisation (CHRO), Christians from the Chin ethnic minority group in Myanmar are facing coercion to convert to Buddhism by state actors and programmes.

== Christianity ==
Christianity was a minority religion during much of the middle Roman Classical Period, and the early Christians were persecuted during that time. When Constantine I converted to Christianity, it was still a minor religion of the Roman Empire. Already under the reign of Constantine I, Christian heretics were being persecuted; beginning in the late 4th century, the ancient pagan religions were also actively suppressed. In the view of many historians, the Constantinian shift turned Christianity from a persecuted religion into a religion which was capable of persecuting and sometimes eager to persecute.

=== Late Antiquity ===
On 27 February 380, together with Gratian and Valentinian II, Theodosius I issued the decree Cunctos populos, the so-called Edict of Thessalonica, recorded in the Codex Theodosianus xvi.1.2. This declared Trinitarian Nicene Christianity to be the only legitimate imperial religion and the only one entitled to call itself Catholic. Other Christians he described as "foolish madmen". He also ended official state support for the traditional polytheist religions and customs.

The Codex Theodosianus (Eng. Theodosian Code) was a compilation of the laws of the Roman Empire under the Christian emperors since 312. A commission was established by Theodosius II and his co-emperor Valentinian III on 26 March 429 and the compilation was published by a constitution of 15 February 438. It went into force in the eastern and western parts of the empire on 1 January 439.

It is Our will that all the peoples who are ruled by the administration of Our Clemency shall practice that religion which the divine Peter the Apostle transmitted to the Romans.... The rest, whom We adjudge demented and insane, shall sustain the infamy of heretical dogmas, their meeting places shall not receive the name of churches, and they shall be smitten first by divine vengeance and secondly by the retribution of Our own initiative (Codex Theodosianus XVI 1.2.).

Forced conversions of Jews were carried out with the support of rulers during Late Antiquity and the early Middle Ages in Gaul, the Iberian Peninsula and in the Byzantine Empire.

In Gregory of Tours' writing, he claimed that the Vandals attempted to force all Spanish Catholics to become Arian Christians during their rule in Spain. Gregory also recounted episodes of forced conversion of Jews by Chilperic I and Avitus of Clermont.

=== Medieval western Europe ===
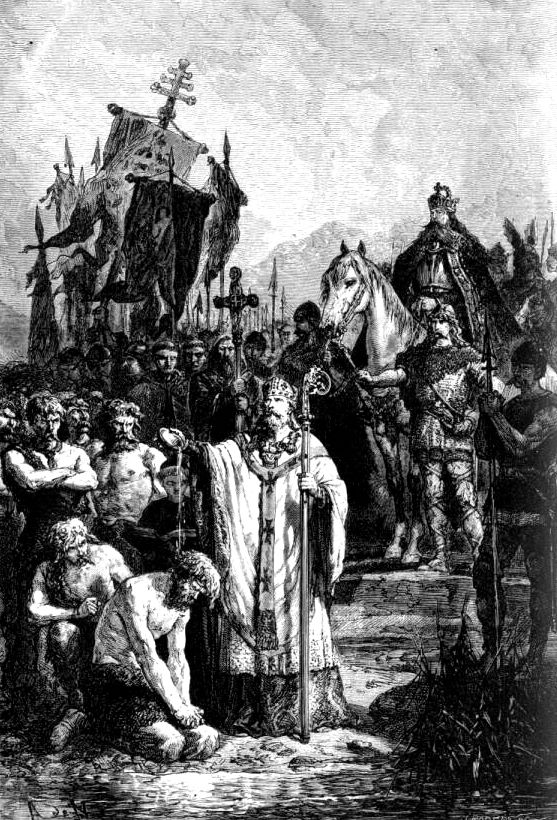
Nineteenth-century illustration depicting the forced Christianization of the Saxons under Charlemagne during the Saxon Wars.

During the Saxon Wars, Charlemagne, King of the Franks, forcibly converted the Saxons from their native Germanic paganism by way of warfare, and law upon conquest. Examples are the Massacre of Verden in 782, when Charlemagne reportedly had 4,500 captive Saxons massacred for rebelling, and the Capitulatio de partibus Saxoniae, a law imposed on conquered Saxons in 785, after another rebellion and destruction of churches and killing of missionary priests and monks, that prescribed death to those who refused to convert to Christianity.

Forced conversion that occurred after the seventh century generally took place during riots and massacres carried out by mobs and clergy without support of the rulers. In contrast, royal persecutions of Jews from the late eleventh century onward generally took the form of expulsions, with some exceptions, such as conversions of Jews in southern Italy of the 13th century, which were carried out by Dominican Inquisitors but instigated by King Charles II of Naples.

Jews were forced to convert to Christianity by the Crusaders in Lorraine, on the Lower Rhine, in Bavaria and Bohemia, in Mainz and in Worms (see Rhineland massacres, Worms massacre (1096)).

Though he strongly condemned and prohibited forced conversion and baptism by decree, Pope Innocent III suggested in a private letter to a bishop in 1201 that those who agreed to be baptized to avoid torture and intimidation might be compelled to outwardly observe Christianity:

[T]hose who are immersed even though reluctant, do belong to ecclesiastical jurisdiction at least by reason of the sacrament, and might therefore be reasonably compelled to observe the rules of the Christian Faith. It is, to be sure, contrary to the Christian Faith that anyone who is unwilling and wholly opposed to it should be compelled to adopt and observe Christianity. For this reason a valid distinction is made by some between kinds of unwilling ones and kinds of compelled ones. Thus one who is drawn to Christianity by violence, through fear and through torture, and receives the sacrament of Baptism in order to avoid loss, he (like one who comes to Baptism in dissimulation) does receive the impress of Christianity, and may be forced to observe the Christian Faith as one who expressed a conditional willingness though, absolutely speaking, he was unwilling ...

During the 12th–13th century Northern Crusades against the pagan Finnic, Baltic, and West Slavic peoples around the Baltic Sea forced conversions were a widely used tactic, which received papal sanction. These tactics were first adopted during the Wendish Crusade and became more widespread during the Livonian Crusade and Prussian Crusade, in which tactics included killing hostages, massacre, and devastation of the lands of tribes that had not yet submitted. Most of the populations of these regions were converted only after the repeated rebellion of native populations that did not want to accept Christianity even after initial forced conversion; in Old Prussia, the tactics employed in the initial conquest and subsequent conversion of the territory resulted in the death of most of the native population, whose language consequently became extinct.

=== Early modern Iberian Peninsula ===
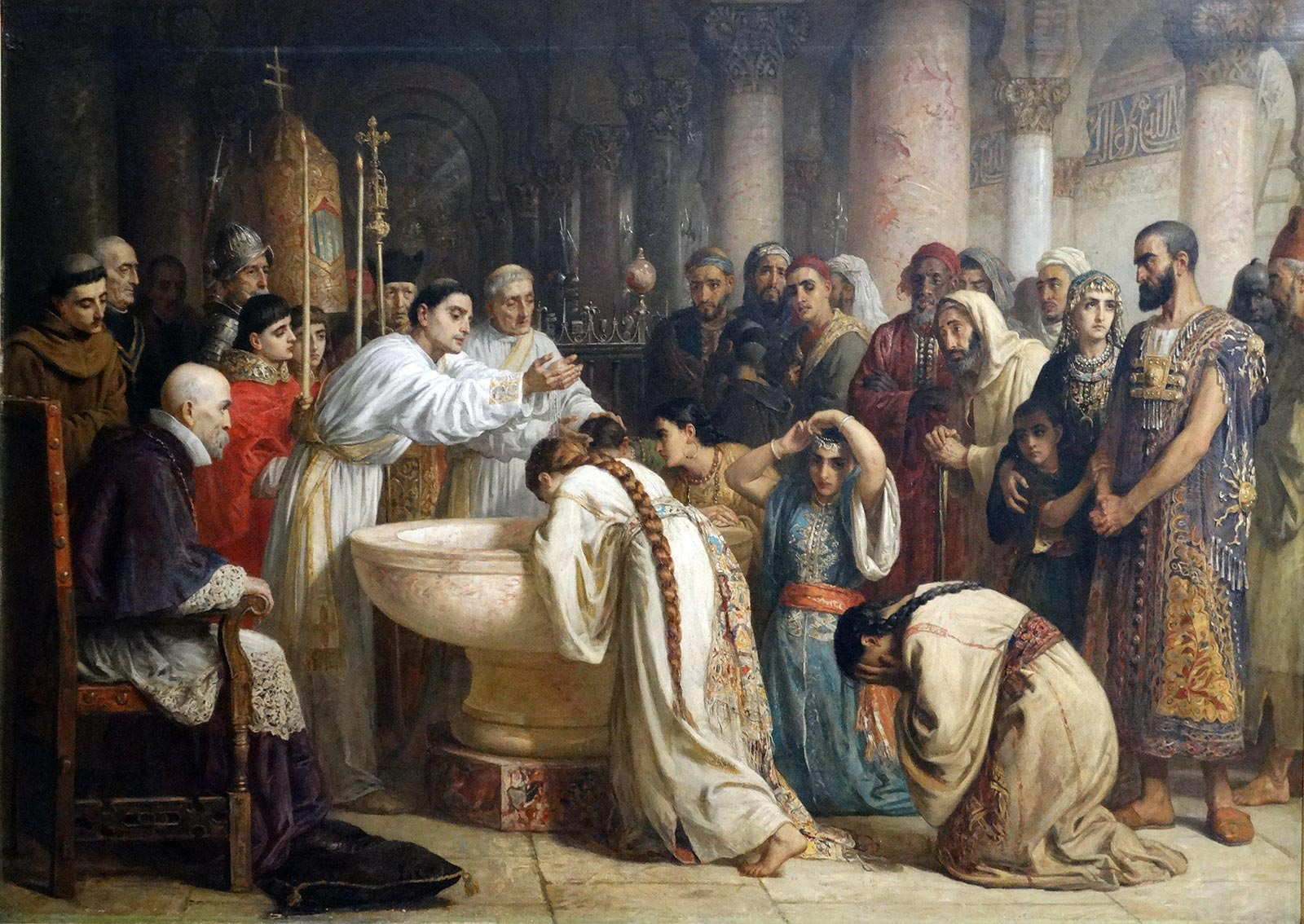
The Moorish Proselytes of Archbishop Ximenes, Granada, 1500, by Edwin Long, portraying the forced mass baptism of Muslims in Granada, Spain, following the Reconquista.

After the end of Islamic control of Spain, Jews were expelled from Spain in 1492. In Portugal, following an order for their expulsion in 1496, only a handful of them were allowed to leave and the rest of them were forced to convert. Muslims were expelled from Portugal in 1497, and they were gradually forced to convert in the constituent kingdoms of Spain. The forced conversion of Muslims was implemented in the Crown of Castile from 1500 to 1502 and it was implemented in the Crown of Aragon in the 1520s. After the conversions, the so-called "New Christians" were those inhabitants (Sephardic Jews or Mudéjar Muslims) who were baptized under coercion as well as in the face of execution, becoming forced converts from Islam (Moriscos, Conversos and "secret Moors") or converts from Judaism (Conversos, Crypto-Jews and Marranos).

After the forced conversions, when all former Muslims and Jews had ostensibly become Catholic, the Spanish and Portuguese Inquisitions primarily targeted forced converts from Judaism and Islam, who came under suspicion, because they were either accused of continuing to adhere to their old religion, or they were accused of falling back into it. Jewish conversos who still resided in Spain and frequently practiced Judaism in secret were suspected of being Crypto-Jews by the "Old Christians". The Spanish Inquisition generated much wealth and income for the church and individual inquisitors by confiscating the property of the persecuted. The end of Al-Andalus and the expulsion of the Sephardic Jews from the Iberian Peninsula went hand in hand with the increasing amount of Spanish and Portuguese influence in the world, influence which was exemplified by the Christian conquest of the aboriginal Indian populations of the Americas. The Ottoman Empire and Morocco absorbed most of the Jewish and Muslim refugees, but a large majority of them remained in Spain and Portugal by choosing to be Conversos.

=== European wars of religion ===
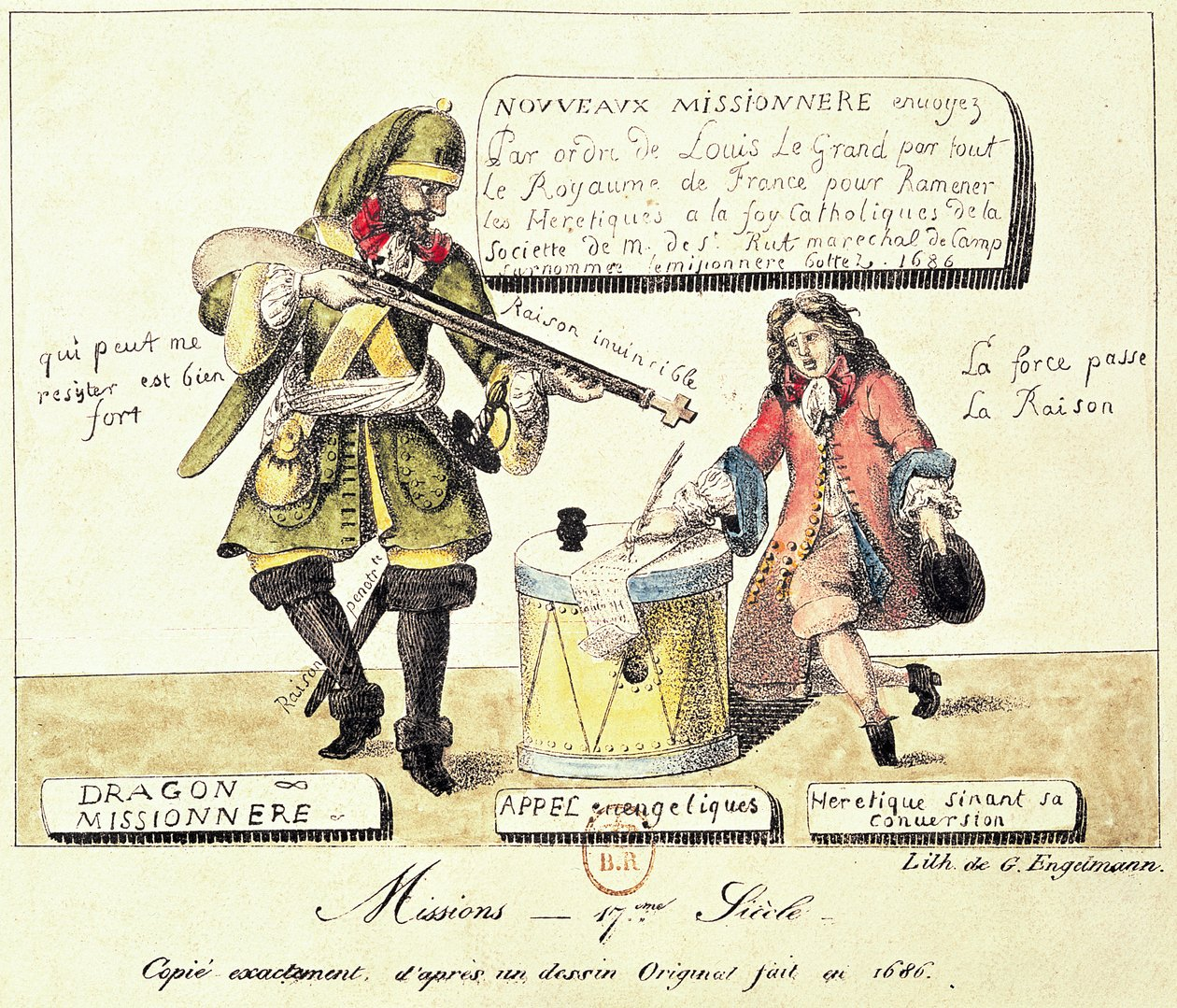
A Protestant political cartoon satirising the Dragonnades in France

The Peace of Augsburg (1555), signed by Charles V, Holy Roman Emperor, stated that German princes could choose the religion (Lutheranism or Catholicism) of their realms according to their conscience (the principle of cuius regio, eius religio). Subjects, citizens, or residents were generally forced to convert to their prince's religion, through a principle called ius reformandi. Those who did not wish to conform to the prince's choice were given a grace period in which they were free to emigrate to different regions in which their desired religion had been accepted. However, serfs were essentially excluded from this right to emigrate.

After the defeat of the rebellious Protestant Estates of the Kingdom of Bohemia by the Habsburg monarchy at the Battle of White Mountain in 1620, the Habsburgs introduced a Counter-Reformation and forcibly converted all Bohemians, even the Utraquist Hussites, back to the Catholic Church. In 1624, Emperor Ferdinand II issued a patent that allowed only the Catholic religion in Bohemia. In the 1620s, Protestant nobility, burghers, and clergy of Bohemia and Austria were expelled from the Habsburg lands or converted to Catholicism, while peasants were forced to adopt the religion of their new Catholic masters.

The Dragonnades was a policy implemented by Louis XIV in 1681 to force French Protestants known as Huguenots to convert to Catholicism. The dragonnades caused Protestants to flee France, even before the Edict of Fontainebleau of 1685 revoked the religious rights granted them by the Edict of Nantes.

=== Colonial Americas ===
During the European colonization of the Americas, forced conversion of the continents' indigenous, non-Christian population was common, especially in South America and Mesoamerica, where the conquest of large indigenous polities like the Inca and Aztec Empires placed colonizers in control of large non-Christian populations. According to some South American leaders and indigenous groups, there were cases among native populations of conversion under the threat of violence, often because they were compelled to after being conquered, and that the Catholic Church cooperated with civil authority to achieve this end.

=== Russia ===
Upon converting to Christianity in the 10th century, Vladimir the Great, the ruler of Kievan Rus', ordered Kiev's citizens to undergo a mass baptism in the Dnieper river.

In the 13th century the pagan populations of the Baltics faced campaigns of forcible conversion by crusading knight corps such as the Livonian Brothers of the Sword and the Teutonic Order, which often meant simply dispossessing these populations of their lands and property.

After Ivan the Terrible's conquest of the Khanate of Kazan, the Muslim population faced slaughter, expulsion, forced resettlement and conversion to Christianity.

In the 18th century, Elizabeth of Russia launched a campaign of forced conversion of Russia's non-Orthodox subjects, including Muslims and Jews.

=== Goa Inquisition ===
The Portuguese carried out the Christianisation of Goa in India in the 16th and 17th centuries. The majority of the natives of Goa had converted to Christianity by the end of the 16th century. The Portuguese rulers had implemented state policies encouraging and even rewarding conversions among Hindu subjects. The rapid rise of converts in Goa was mostly the result of Portuguese economic and political control over the Hindus, who were vassals of the Portuguese crown.

In 1567, the conversion of the majority of the native villagers to Christianity allowed the Portuguese to destroy temples in Bardez, with 300 Hindu temples destroyed. Prohibitions were then declared from 4 December 1567, on public performances of Hindu marriages, sacred thread wearing and cremation. All persons above 15 years of age were compelled to listen to Christian preaching, failing which they were punished. In 1583, Hindu temples at Assolna and Cuncolim were also destroyed by the Portuguese army after the majority of the native villagers there had also converted to Christianity. "The fathers of the Church forbade the Hindus under terrible penalties the use of their own sacred books, and prevented them from all exercise of their religion. They destroyed their temples, and so harassed and interfered with the people that they abandoned the city in large numbers, refusing to remain any longer in a place where they had no liberty, and were liable to imprisonment, torture and death if they worshiped after their own fashion the gods of their fathers", wrote Filippo Sassetti, who was in India from 1578 to 1588.

=== Papal States ===
In 1858, Edgardo Mortara was taken from his Jewish parents and raised as a Catholic, because he had been baptized by a maid without his parents' consent or knowledge. This incident was called the Mortara case.

=== Serbs during World War II in Yugoslavia ===
Forced conversion of Orthodox Serbs to Catholicism in the Independent State of Croatia, c. 1941–1942

During World War II in Yugoslavia, Orthodox Serbs were forcibly converted to Catholicism by the fascist Ustaše movement.

== Hinduism ==
Hindu nationalist groups in southern Chhattisgarh, namely the Bastar subregion, have forced Christians to convert to Hinduism. Hindu nationalist groups at Agra, Uttar Pradesh, have been reported to use allurements to convert poor Muslims and Christians to Hinduism against their will.

Apart from the incidents above, there are other reports of forced conversions of Christians and Muslims in India to Hinduism. Some of them were converted under duress or against their will, specifically through the Ghar Wapsi ("returning home") scheme by Hindu extremists, such as Shiv Sena, the Vishva Hindu Parishad (VHP), and by the ruling political party of the Bharatiya Janata Party (BJP). In 2014, Cardinal Baselios Cleemis protested the forced conversions to Hinduism that happened through the Ghar Wapsi ("homecoming") scheme in the Indian states of Uttar Pradesh, Gujarat and Kerala. The Shiv Sena has said that India or Hindustan is not the homeland of Muslims and Christians. Some Hindu extremist groups like the Bajrang Dal and Rashtriya Swayamsevak Sangh (RSS) have called for mass killings of Christians, and the Hindu Mahasabha has called for the massacres or forced sterilisations of Muslims.

The monitoring or policing of conversions through anti-conversion laws, has undermined the freedom of religion in multiple states and territories of India. Since 2024 in Gujarat, conversion from Hinduism to Buddhism, Jainism and Sikhism require prior permission or approval of the state. Also, the Rashtriya Sikh Sangat formed by the Rashtriya Swayamsevak Sangh (RSS), has claimed that Sikhism is a "colonial construct" or "conspiracy" of British India and that Sikhs were "Hindu" during the Muslim period (Mughal Empire).

== Islam ==
=== Against Christians ===
After the Arab conquests, a number of Christian Arab tribes suffered enslavement and forced conversion.

The Teaching of Jacob (written soon after the death of Muhammad), is one of the earliest records on Islam and "implies that Muslims tried, on threat of death to make Christians abjure Christianity and accept Islam."

=== Jizya and conversion ===
Non-Muslims were required to pay the jizya while pagans were either required to accept Islam, pay the jizya, be exiled, or be killed, depending on which of the four main schools of Islamic law their conqueror followed. Some historians believe that forced conversion was rare in early Islamic history, and most conversions to Islam were voluntary. Muslim rulers were often more interested in conquest than conversion. Ira Lapidus points towards "interwoven terms of political and economic benefits and of a sophisticated culture and religion" as appealing to the masses. He writes that:

The question of why people convert to Islam has always generated the intense feeling. Earlier generations of European scholars believed that conversions to Islam were made at the point of the sword, and that conquered peoples were given the choice of conversion or death. It is now apparent that conversion by force, while not unknown in Muslim countries, was, in fact, rare. Muslim conquerors ordinarily wished to dominate rather than convert, and most conversions to Islam were voluntary. (...) In most cases, worldly and spiritual motives for conversion blended together. Moreover, conversion to Islam did not necessarily imply a complete turning from an old to a totally new life. While it entailed the acceptance of new religious beliefs and membership in a new religious community, most converts retained a deep attachment to the cultures and communities from which they came.

Muslim scholars like Abu Hanifa and Abu Yusuf stated that the jizya tax should be paid by Non-Muslims (Kuffar) regardless of their religion, some later and also earlier Muslim jurists did not permit Non-Muslims who are not People of the Book or Ahle-Kitab (Jews, Christians, Sabians) pay the jizya. Instead, they only allowed them (non-Ahle-Kitab) to avoid death by choosing to convert to Islam. Of the four schools of Islamic jurisprudence, the Hanafi and Maliki schools allow polytheists to be granted dhimmi status, except Arab polytheists. However, the Shafi'i, Hanbali and Zahiri schools only consider Christians, Jews, and Sabians to be eligible to belong to the dhimmi category.

Wael Hallaq states that in theory, Islamic religious tolerance only applied to those religious groups that Islamic jurisprudence considered to be monotheistic "People of the Book", i.e. Christians, Jews, and Sabians if they paid the jizya tax, while to those excluded from the "People of the Book" were only offered two choices: convert to Islam or fight to the death. In practice, the "People of the Book" designation and dhimmi status were even extended to the non-monotheistic religions of the conquered peoples, such as Hindus, Jains, Buddhists, and other non-monotheists.

=== Druze ===
The Druze have frequently experienced persecution by different Muslim regimes such as the Shia Ismaili Fatimid State, Mamluk, Sunni Ottoman Empire, and Egypt Eyalet. The persecution of the Druze included massacres, demolishing Druze prayer houses and holy places and forced conversion to Islam. Those were no ordinary killings and massacres in the Druze's narrative, they were meant to eradicate the whole community according to the Druze narrative.

=== Early period ===
The wars of the Ridda (lit. apostasy) undertaken by Abu Bakr, the first caliph of the Rashidun Caliphate, against Arab tribes who had accepted Islam but refused to pay Zakat, have been described by some historians as an instance of forced conversion or "reconversion". The rebellion of these Arab tribes was less a relapse to the pre-Islamic Arabian religion than termination of a political contract they had made with Muhammad. Some of these tribal leaders claimed prophethood, bringing themselves in direct conflict with the Muslim Caliphate.

Two out of the four schools of Islamic law, i.e. Hanafi and Maliki schools, accepted non-Arab polytheists to be eligible for the dhimmi status. Under this doctrine, Arab polytheists were forced to choose between conversion and death. However, according to perception of most Muslim jurists, all Arabs had embraced Islam during the lifetime of Muhammad. Their exclusion therefore had little practical significance after his death in 632.

Arab historian Al-Baladhuri says that Caliph Umar deported Christians who refused to apostatize and convert to Islam, and that he obeyed the order of the prophet who advised: "there shall not remain two religions in the land of Arabia."

In the 9th century, the Samaritan population of Palestine faced persecution and attempts at forced conversion at the hands of the rebel leader ibn Firāsa, against whom they were defended by Abbasid caliphal troops. Historians recognize that during the Early Middle Ages, the Christian populations living in the lands invaded by the Arab Muslim armies between the 7th and 10th centuries suffered religious discrimination, religious persecution, religious violence, and martyrdom multiple times at the hands of Arab Muslim officials and rulers. As People of the Book, Christians under Muslim rule were subjected to dhimmi status (along with Jews, Samaritans, Gnostics, Mandeans, and Zoroastrians), which was inferior to the status of Muslims. Christians and other religious minorities thus faced religious discrimination and religious persecution in that they were banned from proselytising (for Christians, it was forbidden to evangelize or spread Christianity) in the lands invaded by the Arab Muslims on pain of death, they were banned from bearing arms, undertaking certain professions, and were obligated to dress differently in order to distinguish themselves from Arabs. Under sharia, Non-Muslims were obligated to pay jizya and kharaj taxes, together with periodic heavy ransom levied upon Christian communities by Muslim rulers in order to fund military campaigns, all of which contributed a significant proportion of income to the Islamic states while conversely reducing many Christians to poverty, and these financial and social hardships forced many Christians to convert to Islam. Christians unable to pay these taxes were forced to surrender their children to the Muslim rulers as payment who would sell them as slaves to Muslim households where they were forced to convert to Islam. Many Christians were executed for defending their Christian faith through dramatic acts of resistance such as refusing to convert to Islam, repudiation of the Islamic religion and subsequent reconversion to Christianity, and blasphemy towards Muslim beliefs.

=== Umayyad Caliphate ===
After the Arab conquests a number of Christian Arab tribes suffered enslavement and forced conversion.

During the rise of the Islamic Caliphates, it was increasingly expected for all Arabs to be Muslims and pressure was put on many to convert. The Umayyad Caliph Al-Walid I said to Shamala, the Christian Arab leader of the Banu Taghlib: "As you are a chief of the Arabs you shame them all by worshipping the cross; obey my wish and turn Muslim." He replied, 'How so? I am chief of Taghlib, and I fear lest I become a cause of destruction to them all if I and they cease to believe in christ" Enraged Al-Walid had him dragged away on his face and tortured; afterward he commanded him again to convert to Islam or else prepare to "eat his own flesh." The Christian Arab again refused, and the order was carried out: Walid's servants "cut off a slice from Shamala's thigh and roasted it in the fire, and they thrust it into his mouth" and he was blinded during this as well. This event is confirmed by the Muslim historian Abu al-Faraj al-Isfahani

In the early eighth century under the Umayyads, 63 out of a group of 70 Christian pilgrims from Iconium were captured, tortured, and executed under the orders of the Arab Governor of Ceaserea for refusing to convert to Islam (seven were forcibly converted to Islam under torture). Soon afterwards, sixty more Christian pilgrims from Amorium were crucified in Jerusalem.

=== Almohad Caliphate ===
There were forced conversions in the 12th century under the Almohad dynasty of North Africa and al-Andalus, who suppressed the dhimmi status of Jews and Christians and gave them the choice between conversion, exile, and being executed. The treatment and persecution of Jews under Almohad rule was a drastic change. Prior to Almohad rule during the Caliphate of Córdoba, Jewish culture experienced a Golden Age. María Rosa Menocal, a specialist in Iberian literature at Yale University, has argued that "tolerance was an inherent aspect of Andalusian society", and that the Jewish dhimmis living under the Caliphate, while allowed fewer rights than Muslims, were still better off than in Christian Europe. Many Jews migrated to al-Andalus, where they were not just tolerated but allowed to practice their faith openly. Christians had also practiced their religion openly in Córdoba, and both Jews and Christians lived openly in Morocco as well.

The first Almohad ruler, Abd al-Mumin, allowed an initial seven-month grace period. Then he forced most of the urban dhimmi population in Morocco, both Jewish and Christian, to convert to Islam. In 1198, the Almohad emir Abu Yusuf Yaqub al-Mansur decreed that Jews must wear a dark blue garb, with very large sleeves and a grotesquely oversized hat; his son altered the colour to yellow, a change that may have influenced Catholic ordinances some time later. Those who converted had to wear clothing that identified them as Jews since they were not regarded as sincere Muslims. Cases of mass martyrdom of Jews who refused to convert to Islam are recorded.

Many of the conversions were superficial. Maimonides urged Jews to choose the superficial conversion over martyrdom and argued, "Muslims know very well that we do not mean what we say, and that what we say is only to escape the ruler's punishment and to satisfy him with this simple confession." Abraham Ibn Ezra (1089–1164), who himself fled the persecutions of the Almohads, composed an elegy mourning the destruction of many Jewish communities throughout Spain and the Maghreb under the Almohads. Many Jews fled from territories ruled by the Almohads to Christian lands, and others, like the family of Maimonides, fled east to more tolerant Muslim lands. However, a few Jewish traders still working in North Africa are recorded.

The treatment and persecution of Christians under Almohad rule was a drastic change as well. Many Christians were killed, forced to convert, or forced to flee. Some Christians fled to the Christian kingdoms in the north and west and helped fuel the Reconquista.

Christians under the Almohad rule generally chose to relocate to the Christian principalities (most notably the Kingdom of Asturias) in the north of the Iberian Peninsula, whereas Jews decided to stay in order to keep their properties, and many of them feigned conversion to Islam, while continuing to believe and practice Judaism in secrecy.

During the Almohad persecution, the medieval Jewish philosopher and rabbi Moses Maimonides (1135–1204), one of the leading exponents of the Golden Age of Jewish culture in the Iberian Peninsula, wrote his Epistle on Apostasy, in which he permitted Jews to feign apostasy under duress, though strongly recommending leaving the country instead. There is dispute amongst scholars as to whether Maimonides himself converted to Islam in order to freely escape from Almohad territory, and then reconverted back to Judaism in either the Levant or in Egypt. He was later denounced as an apostate and tried in an Islamic court.

=== Seljuk Empire ===
In order to increase their numbers in Anatolia, the newly arrived Seljuk Turks took Christian children and forcibly converted them to Islam and turkified them, acts specifically mentioned in Antioch, around Samosata, and in western Asia Minor.

=== Danishmend's campaigns ===
During his campaigns, Sultan Malik Danishmend swore to forcibly convert the population of the city of Sisiya Comana to Islam and he did so upon capturing it. The governor of Comana forced its population to pray 5 times a day and those who refused to go to the mosque were brought to it by threat of physical violence. Those who continued to drink wine or do other things that Islam forbids were publicly whipped. The fate of the city of Euchaita was similar, with Malik giving the people the option of converting to Islam or death.

=== Yemen ===
In the late 1160s, the Yemenite ruler 'Abd-al-Nabī ibn Mahdi left Jews with the choice between conversion to Islam or martyrdom. Ibn Mahdi also imposed his beliefs upon the Muslims besides the Jews. This led to a revival of Jewish messianism, but also led to mass-conversion. The persecution ended in 1173 with the defeat of Ibn Mahdi and conquest of Yemen by the brother of Saladin, and they were allowed to return to their Jewish faith.

According to two Cairo Genizah documents, the Ayyubid ruler of Yemen, al-Malik al-Mu'izz al-Ismail (reigned from 1197 to 1202) had attempted to force the Jews of Aden to convert. The second document details the relief of Jewish community after his murder, and those who had been forced to convert reverted to Judaism. While he did not impose Islam upon the foreign merchants, they were forced to pay triple the normal rate of poll tax.

A measure listed in the legal works by Al-Shawkānī is of forced conversion of Jewish orphans. No date is given for this decree by modern studies nor who issued it. The forced conversion of Jewish orphans was reintroduced under Imam Yahya in 1922. The Orphans' Decree was implemented aggressively for the first ten years. It was re-promulgated in 1928.

=== Ottoman Empire ===
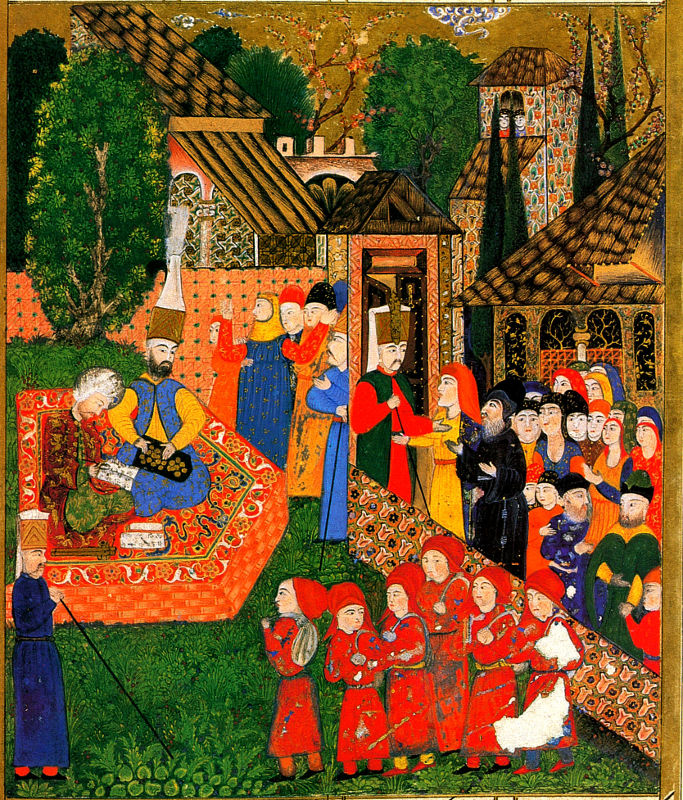
Registration of boys for the devşirme. Ottoman miniature painting from the Süleymanname, 1558.

A form of forced conversion became institutionalized during the Ottoman Empire in the practice of devşirme, a human levy in which Christian boys were seized and collected from their families (usually in the Balkans), enslaved, forcefully converted to Islam, and then trained as elite military unit within the Ottoman army or for high-ranking service to the sultan. From the mid to late 14th, through early 18th centuries, the devşirme–janissary system enslaved an estimated 500,000 to one million non-Muslim adolescent males. These boys would attain a great education and high social standing after their training and conversion.

The Byzantine historian Doukas recounts two other cases of forced or attempted forced conversion: one of a Christian official who had offended Sultan Murad II, and the other of an archbishop.

Speros Vryonis cites a pastoral letter from 1338 addressed to the residents of Nicaea indicating widespread, forcible conversion by the Turks after it was conquered: "And they [Turks] having captured and enslaved many of our own and violently forced them and dragging them along alas! So that they took up their evil and godlessness."

After the Siege of Nicaea (1328–1331) The Turks began to force the Christian inhabitants who had escaped the massacres to convert to Islam. The patriarch of Constantinople John XIX wrote a message to the people of Nicea shortly after the city was seized. His letter says that "The invaders endeavored to impose their impure religion on the populace, at all costs, intending to make the inhabitants followers of Muhammad". Patriarch advised the Christians to "be steadfast in your religion" and not to forget that the "Turks are masters of your bodies only, but not of your souls.

Apostolos Vakalopoulos comments on the first Ottoman invasions of Europe and Dimitar Angelov gives assessment on the Campaigns on Murad II and Mehmed II and their impact on the conquered native Balkan Christians:

From the very beginning of the Turkish onslaught [in Thrace] under Suleiman [son of Sultan Orhan], the Turks tried to consolidate their position by the forcible imposition of Islam. If [the Ottoman historian] Şükrullah is to be believed, those who refused to accept the Moslem faith were slaughtered and their families enslaved. "Where there were bells," writes the same author [Şükrullah], "Suleiman broke them up and cast them into fires. Where there were churches he destroyed them or converted them into mosques. Thus, in place of bells there were now muezzins. Wherever Christian infidels were still found, vassalage was imposed on their rulers. At least in public they could no longer say 'kyrie eleison' but rather 'There is no God but Allah'; and where once their prayers had been addressed to Christ, they were now to "Muhammad, the prophet of Allah."

According to historian Demetrios Constantelos, "Mass forced conversions were recorded during the caliphates of Selim I (1512–1520),...Selim II (1566–1574), and Murat III (1574–1595). On the occasion of some anniversary, such as the capture of a city, or a national holiday, many rayahs were forced to apostacize. On the day of the circumcision of Mehmed III, great numbers of Christians (Albanians, Greeks, Slavs) were forced to convert to Islam." After reviewing the martyrology of Christians killed by the Ottomans from the fall of Constantinople all the way to the final phases of the Greek War of Independence, Constantelos reports:

The Ottoman Turks condemned to death eleven Ecumenical Patriarchs of Constantinople, nearly one hundred bishops, and several thousand priests, deacons, and monks. It is impossible to say with certainty how many men of the cloth were forced to apostasize.

For strategic reasons, the Ottomans forcibly converted Christians living in the frontier regions of Macedonia and northern Bulgaria, particularly in the 16th and 17th centuries. Those who refused were either executed or burned alive.

The community budgets of Jews was heavily burdened by the repurchasing of Jewish slaves abducted by Arab, Berber, or Turkish pirates, or by military raids. The mental trauma due to captivity and slavery caused unransomed prisoners who had lost family, money, and friends to convert to Islam.

During his travels through the Salt lake region of central Anatolia, Jean-Baptiste Tavernier observed in the town of Mucur, "there are numbers of Greeks who are forced everyday to become Turks".

During the genocide and persecution of Greeks in the 20th century, there were cases of forced conversion to Islam (see also Armenian genocide, Assyrian genocide, and Hamidian massacres).

=== Iran ===
Ismail I, the founder of the Safavid dynasty, decreed Twelver Shiism to be the official religion of state and ordered executions of a number of Sunni intellectuals who refused to accept Shiism. Non-Muslims faced frequent persecutions and at times forced conversions under the rule of his dynastic successors. Thus, after the capture of the Hormuz Island, Abbas I required local Christians to convert to Twelver Shia Islam, Abbas II granted his ministers authority to force Jews to become Shia Muslims, and Sultan Husayn decreed forcible conversion of Zoroastrians. In 1839, during the Qajar era the Jewish community in the city of Mashhad was attacked by a mob and subsequently forced to convert to Shia Islam.

In Persia, instances of forced conversion of Jews took place in 1291 and 1318, and those in Baghdad in 1333 and 1344. In 1617 and 1622, a wave of forced conversions and persecution, provoked by the slander of Jewish apostates, swept over the Jews of Persia, sparing neither Nestorian Christians nor Armenians. From 1653 to 1666, during the reign of Shah Abbas II, all the Jews in Persia were Islamized by force. However, religious freedom was eventually restored. A law in 1656 gave Jewish or Christian converts to Islam exclusive rights of inheritance. This law was alleviated for the Christians as a concession to Pope Alexander VII but remained in force for Jews until the end of the nineteenth century. David Cazés mentions the existence in Tunisia of similar inheritance laws favoring converts to Islam.

=== Indian subcontinent ===
In an invasion of the Kashmir Valley (1015), Mahmud of Ghazni plundered the valley, took many prisoners and carried out conversions to Islam. In his later campaigns, in Mathura, Baran and Kanauj, again, many conversions took place. Those soldiers who surrendered to him were converted to Islam. In Baran (Bulandshahr) alone 10,000 persons were converted to Islam including the king. Tarikh-i-Yamini, Rausat-us-Safa and Tarikh-i-Ferishtah speak of construction of mosques and schools and appointment of preachers and teachers by Mahmud and his successor Masud. Wherever Mahmud went, he insisted on the people to convert to Islam. The raids by Muhammad Ghori and his generals brought in thousands of slaves in the late 12th century, most of whom were compelled to convert as one of the preconditions of their freedom. Sikandar Butshikan (1394–1417) demolished Hindu temples and forcefully converted Hindus.

Aurangzeb employed a number of means to encourage conversions to Islam. The ninth guru of Sikhs, Guru Tegh Bahadur, was beheaded in Delhi on orders of Aurangzeb for refusing to convert to Islam. In a Mughal-Sikh war in 1715, 700 followers of Banda Singh Bahadur were beheaded. Sikhs were executed for not apostatizing from Sikhism. Banda Singh Bahadur was offered a pardon if he converted to Islam. Upon refusal, he was tortured, and was killed with his five-year-old son. Following the execution of Banda, the emperor ordered to apprehend Sikhs anywhere they were found.

18th century ruler Tipu Sultan persecuted the Hindus, Christians and Mappila Muslims. During Sultan's Mysorean invasion of Kerala, hundreds of temples and churches were demolished and ten thousands of Christians and Hindus were killed or converted to Islam by force.

=== Contemporary period ===
==== South Asia ====
===== Bangladesh =====
In Bangladesh, the International Crimes Tribunal tried and convicted several leaders of the Islamic Razakar militias, as well as Bangladesh Muslim Awami league (Forid Uddin Mausood), of war crimes committed against Hindus during the 1971 Bangladesh genocide. The charges included forced conversion of Bengali Hindus to Islam.

===== India =====
In the 1998 Prankote massacre, 26 Kashmiri Hindus were beheaded by Islamist militants after their refusal to convert to Islam. The militants struck when the villagers refused demands from the gunmen to convert to Islam and prove their conversion by eating beef. During the Noakhali riots in 1946, several thousand Hindus were forcibly converted to Islam by Muslim mobs.

===== Pakistan =====
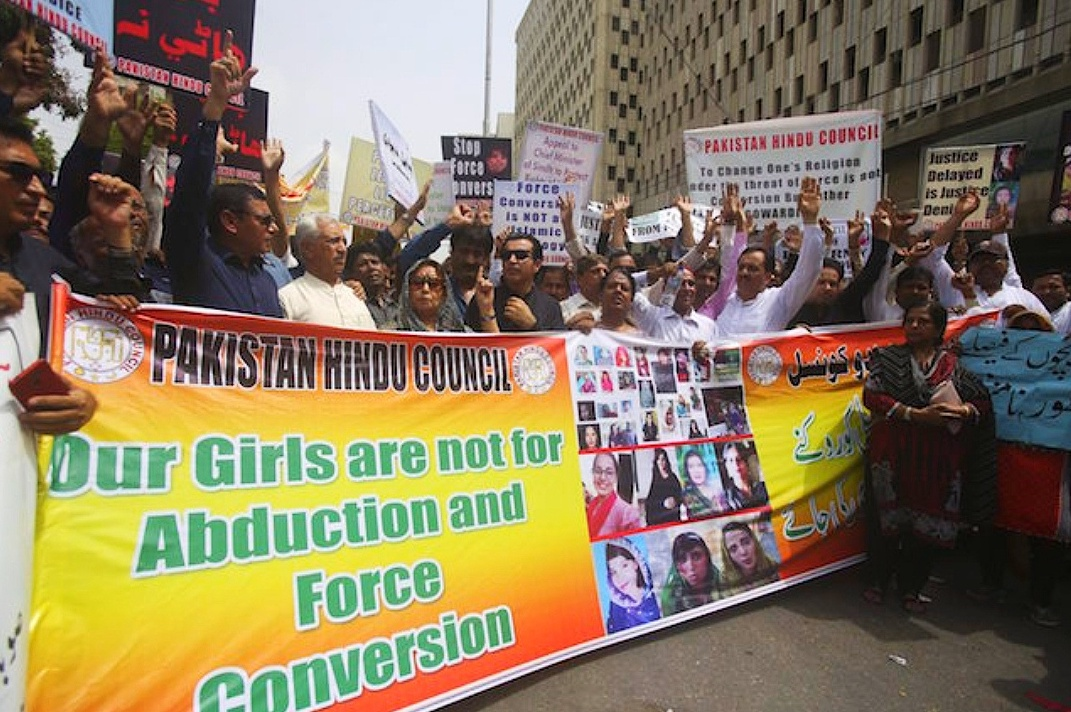
Protest against the forced conversion of Hindu girls in Pakistan, organized by the Pakistan Hindu Council.

Members of minority religions in Pakistan face discrimination every day. This leads to socio-political and economic exclusion and severe marginalization in all aspects of life. In a country that is 96 percent Muslim, targeting of its religious minorities (3 percent), especially Shias, Ahmadis, Hindus and Christians, is widespread.

The rise of Taliban insurgency in Pakistan has been an influential and increasing factor in the persecution of and discrimination against religious minorities, such as Hindus, Christians, Sikhs, and other minorities.

The Human Rights Council of Pakistan has reported that cases of forced conversion are increasing. A 2014 report by the Movement for Solidarity and Peace (MSP) says about 1,000 women in Pakistan are forcibly converted to Islam every year (700 Christian and 300 Hindu).

In 2003, a six-year-old Sikh girl was kidnapped by a member of the Afridi tribe in Northwest Frontier Province; the alleged kidnapper claimed the girl was actually 12 years old, had converted to Islam, and therefore could not be returned to her non-Muslim family. In Pakistan's Sindh province, a distressing pattern of crimes has emerged, including the abduction, coerced conversion to Islam, and subsequent marriage to older Muslim men who are often abductors. These crimes primarily target underage girls from impoverished Hindu families.

Rinkle Kumari, a 19-year Pakistani student, Lata Kumari, and Asha Kumari, a Hindu working in a beauty parlor, were allegedly forced to convert from Hinduism to Islam. They told the judge that they wanted to go with their parents. Their cases were appealed all the way to the Supreme Court of Pakistan. The appeal was admitted but remained unheard ever after. Rinkle was abducted by a gang and "forced" to convert to Islam, before being head shaved.

Sikhs in Hangu District stated they were being pressured to convert to Islam by Yaqoob Khan, the assistant commissioner of Tall Tehsil, in December 2017. However, the Deputy Commissioner of Hangu Shahid Mehmood denied it occurred and claimed that Sikhs were offended during a conversation with Yaqub though it was not intentional.

Many Hindu girls living in Pakistan are kidnapped, forcibly converted and married to Muslims. According to another report from the Movement for Solidarity and Peace, about 1,000 non-Muslim girls are converted to Islam each year in Pakistan. According to the Amarnath Motumal, the vice chairperson of the Human Rights Commission of Pakistan, every month, an estimated 20 or more Hindu girls are abducted and converted, although exact figures are impossible to gather. In 2014 alone, 265 legal cases of forced conversion were reported mostly involving Hindu girls.

A total of 57 Hindus converted in Pasrur during 14–19 May. On 14 May 35 Hindus of the same family were forced to convert by their employer because his sales dropped after Muslims started boycotting his eatable items as they were prepared by Hindus as well as their persecution by the Muslim employees of neighbouring shops according to their relatives. Since the impoverished Hindu had no other way to earn and needed to keep the job to survive, they converted. 14 members of another family converted on 17 May since no one was employing them, later another Hindu man and his family of eight under pressure from Muslims to avoid their land being grabbed.

In 2017, the Sikh community in Hangu district of Pakistan's Khyber-Pakhtunkhwa province alleged that they were "being forced to convert to Islam" by a government official. Farid Chand Singh, who filed the complaint, has claimed that Assistant Commissioner Tehsil Tall Yaqoob Khan was allegedly forcing Sikhs to convert to Islam and the residents of Doaba area are being tortured religiously. According to reports, about 60 Sikhs of Doaba had demanded security from the administration.

Many Hindus voluntarily convert to Islam in order to acquire Watan Cards and National Identification Cards. These converts are also given land and money. For example, 428 poor Hindus in Matli were converted between 2009 and 2011 by the Madrassa Baitul Islam, a Deobandi seminary in Matli, which pays off the debts of Hindus converting to Islam. Another example is the conversion of 250 Hindus to Islam in Chohar Jamali area in Thatta. Conversions are also carried out by Ex Hindu Baba Deen Mohammad Shaikh mission which converted 108,000 people to Islam since 1989.

Within Pakistan, the southern province of Sindh had over 1,000 forced conversions of Christian and Hindu girls according to the annual report of the Human Rights Commission of Pakistan in 2018. According to victims' families and activists, Mian Abdul Haq, who is a local political and religious leader in Sindh, has been accused of being responsible for forced conversions of girls within the province.

More than 100 Hindus in Sindh converted to Islam in June 2020 to escape discrimination and economic pressures. Islamic charities and clerics offer incentives of jobs or land to impoverished minorities on the condition that they convert. New York Times summarised the view of Hindu groups that these seemingly voluntary conversions "take place under such economic duress that they are tantamount to a forced conversion anyway."

In October 2020, the Pakistani High Court upheld the validity of a forced marriage between 44-year-old Ali Azhar and 13-year-old Christian Arzoo Raja. Raja was abducted by Azhar, forcibly wed to Azhar and then forcibly converted to Islam by Azhar. The ruling was overturned a month later, and Raja was returned to her home, with Azhar arrested. Pakistan has been found in breach of its international commitments to safeguard non-Muslim girls from exploitation by influential factions and criminal elements, as forced conversions have become commonplace within the nation. This concerning trend is on the rise, notably observed in the districts of Tharparkar, Umerkot, and Mirpur Khas in Sindh.

==== Indonesia ====
In 2012, over 1000 Catholic children in East Timor, removed from their families, were reported to being held in Indonesia without consent of their parents, forcibly converted to Islam, educated in Islamic schools and naturalized. Other reports claim forced conversion of minority Ahmadiyya sect Muslims to Sunni Islam, with the use of violence.

In 2001 the Indonesian army evacuated hundreds of Christian refugees from the remote Kesui and Teor islands in Maluku after the refugees stated that they had been forced to convert to Islam. According to reports, some of the men had been circumcised against their will, and a paramilitary group involved in the incident confirmed that circumcisions had taken place while denying any element of coercion.

In 2017, many members of the Orang Rimba tribe, especially children, were being forced to renounce their folk religion and convert to Islam.

==== West Asia ====
There have been a number of reports of attempts to forcibly convert religious minorities in Iraq. The Yazidi people of northern Iraq, who follow an ethnoreligious syncretic faith, have been threatened with forced conversion by the Islamic State of Iraq and the Levant, who consider their practices to be Satanism. UN investigators have reported mass killings of Yazidi men and boys who refused to convert to Islam. In Baghdad, hundreds of Assyrian Christians fled their homes in 2007 when a local extremist group announced that they had to convert to Islam, pay the jizya or die. In March 2007, the BBC reported that people in the Mandaean ethnic and religious minority in Iraq alleged that they were being targeted by Islamist insurgents, who offered them the choice of conversion or death.

In 2006, two journalists of the Fox News Network were kidnapped at gunpoint in the Gaza Strip by a previously unknown militant group. After being forced to read statements on videotape proclaiming that they had converted to Islam, they were released by their captors.

Allegations of Coptic Christian girls being forced to marry Arab Muslim men and convert to Islam in Egypt have been reported by a number of news and advocacy organizations and have sparked public protests. According to a 2009 report by the US State Department, observers have found it extremely difficult to determine whether compulsion was used, and in recent years no such cases have been independently verified.

Coptic women and girls are abducted, forced to convert to Islam and marry Muslim men. In 2009, the Washington, D.C.–based group Christian Solidarity International published a study of the abductions and forced marriages and the anguish felt by the young women because returning to Christianity is against the law. Further allegations of organised abduction of Copts, trafficking and police collusion continue in 2017.

==== United Kingdom ====
According to the UK prison officers' union, some Muslim prisoners in the UK have been forcibly converting fellow inmates to Islam in prisons. An independent government report published in 2023 found that there have been multiple cases of Muslim gangs threatening non-Muslim prisoners to "convert or get hurt".

In 2007, a Sikh girl's family claimed that she had been forcibly converted to Islam, and they received a police guard after being attacked by an armed gang, although the "Police said no one was injured in the incident".

In response to these news stories, an open letter to Sir Ian Blair, signed by ten Hindu academics, argued that claims that Hindu and Sikh girls were being forcefully converted were "part of an arsenal of myths propagated by right-wing Hindu supremacist organisations in India". The Muslim Council of Britain issued a press release pointing out there is a "lack of evidence" of any forced conversions and suggested it is an underhand attempt to smear the British Muslim population.

An academic paper by Katy Sian published in the journal South Asian Popular Culture in 2011 explored the question of how "'forced' conversion narratives" arose around the Sikh diaspora in the United Kingdom. Sian, who reports that claims of conversion through courtship on campuses are widespread in the UK, indicates that rather than relying on actual evidence they primarily rest on the word of "a friend of a friend" or on personal anecdote. According to Sian, the narrative is similar to accusations of "white slavery" lodged against the Jewish community and foreigners to the UK and the US, with the former having ties to antisemitism that mirror the Islamophobia betrayed by the modern narrative. Sian expanded on these views in 2013's Mistaken Identities, Forced Conversions, and Postcolonial Formations.

In 2018, a report by a Sikh activist organisation, Sikh Youth UK, entitled "The Religiously Aggravated Sexual Exploitation of Young Sikh Women Across the UK" made allegations of similarities between the case of Sikh Women and the Rotherham child sexual exploitation scandal. However, in 2019, this report was criticised by researchers and an official UK government report led by two Sikh academics for false and misleading information. It noted: "The RASE report lacks solid data, methodological transparency and rigour. It is filled instead with sweeping generalisations and poorly substantiated claims around the nature and scale of abuse of Sikh girls and causal factors driving it. It appealed heavily to historical tensions between Sikhs and Muslims and narratives of honour in a way that seemed designed to whip up fear and hate".

== Judaism ==
Under the Hasmonean Kingdom, the Idumeans were forced to convert to Judaism, by threat of exile or death, depending on the source. In Eusebíus, Christianity, and Judaism, Harold W. Attridge claims that Josephus' account was accurate and that John Hyrcanus (around 115 BCE) demolished the city of Pella in Moab, because the inhabitants refused to adopt Jewish national customs. Maurice Sartre writes of the "policy of forced Judaization adopted by Hyrcanos, Aristobulus I and Jannaeus", who offered "the conquered peoples a choice between expulsion or conversion," William Horbury postulates that an existing small Jewish population in Lower Galilee was massively expanded by forced conversion around 104 BCE. Yigal Levin, conversely, argues that many non-Jewish communities, such as Idumeans, voluntarily assimilated in Hasmonean Judea, based on archaeological evidence and cultural affinities between the groups.

In 2009, the BBC claimed that in 524 CE the Himyarite Kingdom, who had adopted Judaism as the de facto state religion two centuries earlier, led by King Yusuf Dhu Nuwas, had offered residents of a village in what is now Saudi Arabia the choice between conversion to Judaism or death, and that 20,000 Christians had then been massacred. During the reign of Dhu Nuwas, a political-power transferring process began and during it, the Himyarite kingdom became a tributary of the Kingdom of Aksum, which had adopted Christianity as its de facto state religion two centuries earlier. This process was completed by the time of the reign of Ma'dīkarib Yafur (519-522), a Christian who was appointed by the Aksumites. A coup d'état ensued, with Dhu Nuwas assuming authority after the killing of the Aksumite garrison in Zafar. A general was sent against Najrān, a predominantly Christian oasis, with a good number of Jews, who refused to recognize his authority. The general blocked the caravan route which connected Najrān with Eastern Arabia and he also persecuted the Christian population of Najrān. Dhu Nuwas campaign eventually killed between 11,500 and 14,000, and took a similar number of prisoners.

Some Ethiopian Jews (also known as Beta Israel) were forcibly converted to mainstream Rabbinical Judaism following their covert evacuation to Israel during Operation Moses and Operation Solomon. Their native form of Judaism, commonly called Haymanot, is looked down upon by the Israeli government and the Chief Rabbinate of Israel. In 1973, Rabbi Ovadia Yosef ruled that Ethiopian Jews are indeed Jewish according to Jewish law, which was a crucial step in paving the way for their immigration to Israel. Despite his initial ruling, the Chief Rabbinate, over the objections of many in the community, later required symbolic conversions for many immigrants to ensure full acceptance by all rabbinic authorities. In 2020, the Chief Rabbinate Council officially adopted the 1973 ruling of Rabbi Ovadia Yosef, confirming full recognition of the Jewishness of the Ethiopian community without the need for conversion.

Other instances of forced conversion to Judaism are unknown.

== Atheism ==
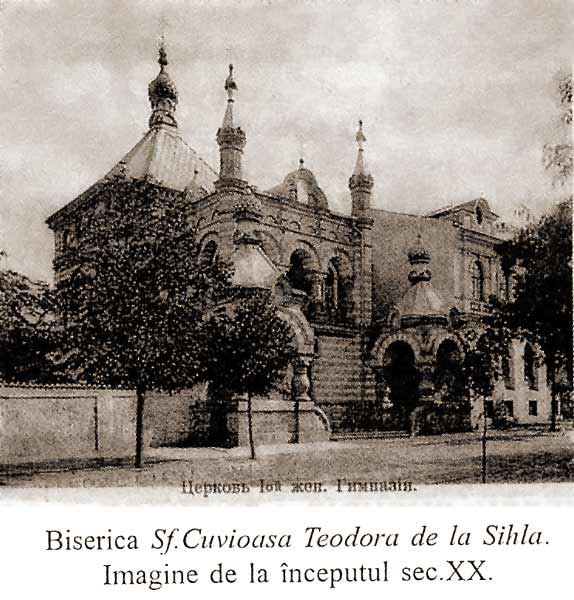
"St. Theodora Church in downtown Chişinău was converted into the city's Museum of Scientific Atheism". —Andrei Brezianu

=== Eastern Bloc ===
Under the doctrine of state atheism in the Soviet Union, there was a "government-sponsored program of forced conversion to atheism" conducted by communists. This program included the overarching objective to establish not only a fundamentally materialistic conception of the universe, but to foster "direct and open criticism of the religious outlook" by means of establishing an "anti-religious trend" across the entire school. The Russian Orthodox Church, for centuries the strongest of all Orthodox Churches, was violently suppressed. Revolutionary leader Vladimir Lenin wrote that every religious idea and every idea of God "is unutterable vileness... of the most dangerous kind, 'contagion of the most abominable kind". Many priests were killed and imprisoned. Thousands of churches were closed, some turned into hospitals. In 1925, the government founded the League of Militant Atheists to intensify the persecution.

Christopher Marsh, a professor at Baylor University writes that "Tracing the social nature of religion from Schleiermacher and Feurbach to Marx, Engels, and Lenin... the idea of religion as a social product evolved to the point of policies aimed at the forced conversion of believers to atheism." Jonathan Blake of the Department of Political Science at Columbia University elucidates the history of this practice in the USSR, stating that:

God, however, did not simply vanish after the Bolshevik revolution. Soviet authorities relied heavily on coercion to spread their idea of scientific atheism. This included confiscating church goods and property, forcibly closing religious institutions and executing religious leaders and believers or sending them to the gulag... Later, the United States passed the Jackson–Vanik amendment which harmed US–Soviet trade relations until the USSR permitted the emigration of religious minorities, primarily Jews. Despite the threat from coreligionists abroad, however, the Soviet Union engaged in forced atheism from its earliest days.

Across Eastern Europe following World War II, the parts of the Nazi Empire conquered by the Soviet Red Army, and Yugoslavia became one party communist states and the project of coercive conversion continued. The Soviet Union ended its war time truce against the Russian Orthodox Church, and extended its persecutions to the newly communist Eastern bloc: "In Poland, Hungary, Lithuania and other Eastern European countries, Catholic leaders who were unwilling to be silent were denounced, publicly humiliated or imprisoned by the communists. Leaders of the national Orthodox Churches in Romania and Bulgaria had to be cautious and submissive", wrote Blainey. While the churches were generally not as severely treated as they had been in the USSR, nearly all their schools and many of their churches were closed, and they lost their formerly prominent roles in public life. Children were taught atheism, and clergy were imprisoned by the thousands.

In the Eastern Bloc, Christian churches, Jewish synagogues and Islamic mosques were forcibly "converted into museums of atheism." Historical essayist Andrei Brezianu expounds upon this situation, specifically in the Socialist Republic of Romania, writing that scientific atheism was "aggressively applied to Moldova, immediately after the 1940 annexation, when churches were profaned, clergy assaulted, and signs and public symbols of religion were prohibited"; he provides an example of this phenomenon, further writing that "St. Theodora Church in downtown Chişinău was converted into the city's Museum of Scientific Atheism". Marxist-Leninist regimes treated religious believers as subversives or abnormal, sometimes relegating them to psychiatric hospitals and reeducation. Nevertheless, historian Emily Baran writes that "some accounts suggest the conversion to militant atheism did not always end individuals' existential questions".

=== French Revolution ===
During the French Revolution, a campaign of dechristianization happened which included removal and destruction of religious objects from places of worship; English librarian Thomas Hartwell Horne and biblical scholar Samuel Davidson write that "churches were converted into 'temples of reason,' in which atheistical and licentious homilies were substituted for the proscribed service".

Unlike later establishments of state atheism by communist regimes, the French Revolutionary experiment was short (seven months), incomplete and inconsistent. Even though it was brief, the French experiment was particularly notable because it influenced atheists such as Ludwig Feuerbach, Sigmund Freud and Karl Marx.

=== East Asia ===
The emergence of communist states across East Asia after World War Two saw religion purged by atheist regimes across China, North Korea and much of Indo-China. In 1949, China became a communist state under the leadership of Mao Zedong's Chinese Communist Party. Prior to this takeover, China itself was previously a cradle of religious thought since ancient times, being the birthplace of Confucianism and Daoism, and Buddhists arrived in the first century CE. Under Mao, China became an officially atheist state, and even though some religious practices were permitted to continue under State supervision, religious groups which are considered a threat to law and order have been suppressed—such as Tibetan Buddhism from 1959 and Falun Gong in recent years. Religious schools and social institutions were closed, foreign missionaries were expelled, and local religious practices were discouraged. During the Cultural Revolution, Mao instigated "struggles" against the Four Olds: "old ideas, customs, culture, and habits of mind". In 1999, the Communist Party launched a three-year drive to promote atheism in Tibet, saying that intensifying atheist propaganda is "especially important for Tibet because atheism plays an extremely important role in promoting economic construction, social advancement and socialist spiritual civilization in the region".

As of November 2018, in present-day China, the government has detained many people in internment camps, "where Uighur Muslims are remade into atheist Chinese subjects". For children who were forcibly taken away from their parents, the Chinese government has established "orphanages" with the aim of "converting future generations of Uighur Muslim children into loyal subjects who embrace atheism".

=== Revolutionary Mexico ===
Articles 3, 5, 24, 27, and 130 of the Mexican Constitution of 1917 as originally enacted were anticlerical and enormously restricted religious freedoms. At first the anticlerical provisions were only sporadically enforced, but when President Plutarco Elías Calles took office, he enforced the provisions strictly. Calles' Mexico has been characterized as an atheist state and his program as being one to eradicate religion in Mexico.

All religions had their properties expropriated, and these became part of government wealth. There was a forced expulsion of foreign clergy and the seizure of Church properties. Article 27 prohibited any future acquisition of such property by the churches, and prohibited religious corporations and ministers from establishing or directing primary schools. This second prohibition was sometimes interpreted to mean that the Church could not give religious instruction to children within the churches on Sundays, seen as destroying the ability of Catholics to be educated in their own religion.

The Constitution of 1917 also closed and forbade the existence of monastic orders (article 5), forbade any religious activity outside of church buildings (now owned by the government), and mandated that such religious activity would be overseen by the government (article 24).

On 14 June 1926, President Calles enacted anticlerical legislation known formally as The Law Reforming the Penal Code and unofficially as the Calles Law. His anti-Catholic actions included outlawing religious orders, depriving the Church of property rights and depriving the clergy of civil liberties, including their right to a trial by jury (in cases involving anti-clerical laws) and the right to vote. Catholic antipathy towards Calles was enhanced because of his vocal atheism.

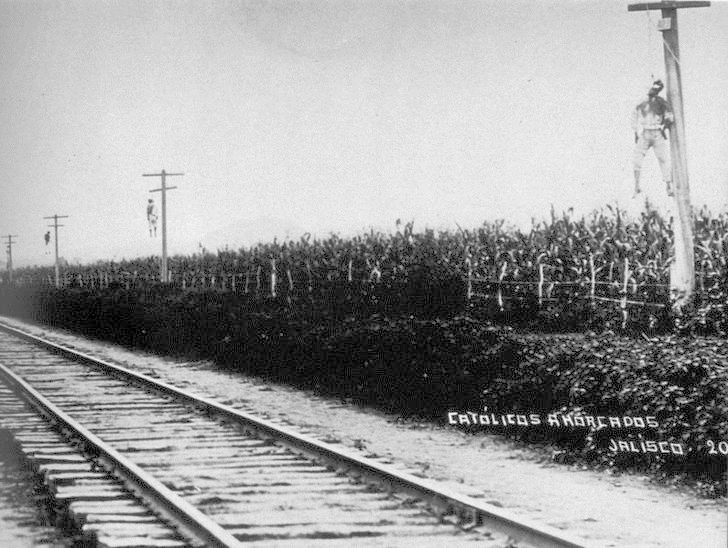
Cristeros hanged in Jalisco

Due to the strict enforcement of anti-clerical laws, people in strongly Catholic areas, especially the states of Jalisco, Zacatecas, Guanajuato, Colima and Michoacán, began to oppose him, and this opposition led to the Cristero War from 1926 to 1929, which was characterized by brutal atrocities on both sides. Some Cristeros applied terrorist tactics, while the Mexican government persecuted the clergy, killing suspected Cristeros and supporters and often retaliating against innocent individuals. In Tabasco state, the so-called "Red Shirts" began to act.

A truce was negotiated with the assistance of U.S. Ambassador Dwight Whitney Morrow. Calles, however, did not abide by the terms of the truce – in violation of its terms, he had approximately 500 Cristero leaders and 5,000 other Cristeros shot, frequently in their homes in front of their spouses and children. Particularly offensive to Catholics after the supposed truce was Calles' insistence on a complete state monopoly on education, suppressing all Catholic education and introducing "socialist" education in its place: "We must enter and take possession of the mind of childhood, the mind of youth". The persecution continued as Calles maintained control under his Maximato and did not relent until 1940, when President Manuel Ávila Camacho, a believing Catholic, took office. This attempt to indoctrinate the youth in atheism was begun in 1934 by amending Article 3 to the Mexican Constitution to eradicate religion by mandating "socialist education", which "in addition to removing all religious doctrine" would "combat fanaticism and prejudices", "build[ing] in the youth a rational and exact concept of the universe and of social life". In 1946 this "socialist education" was removed from the constitution and the document returned to the less egregious generalized secular education. The effects of the war on the Church were profound. Between 1926 and 1934 at least 40 priests were killed. Where there were 4,500 priests operating within the country before the rebellion, in 1934 there were only 334 priests licensed by the government to serve fifteen million people, the rest having been eliminated by emigration, expulsion, and assassination. By 1935, 17 states had no priest at all.

=== Southeast Asia ===
From April 1975 to January 1979, the Khmer Rouge ruled Democratic Kampuchea led by Pol Pot under an official policy of state atheism, regarding all forms of religion as "reactionary" and incompatible with the revolutionary ideology. The regime abolished religious institutions, prohibited worship, and criminalised the possession of religious texts or symbols.

Buddhism, followed by the majority of Cambodians, was particularly affected. Monastic life was dismantled when monks were forcibly defrocked and sent to perform agricultural labour, pagodas were closed or destroyed, and statues of the Buddha were defaced or smashed. Estimates suggest that out of approximately 60,000 monks in Cambodia before 1975, fewer than 3,000 survived by 1979, with many executed or dying from forced labour, starvation, or illness. The destruction extended to Buddhist libraries, manuscripts, and ritual objects, effectively dismantling the country's centuries-old monastic traditions.

These policies formed part of the Khmer Rouge's broader attempt to eradicate all pre-revolutionary cultural and social structures in what they called "Year Zero". Although the regime did not use the term "conversion to atheism", the enforced abandonment of religious practice, combined with indoctrination into the state's ideology, effectively compelled the population to adopt an atheist stance in public life.

== See also ==
- Al-Baqara 256
- Criticism of atheism
- Criticism of religion
- Crypto-Christianity
- Crypto-Islam
- Crypto-Judaism
- Crypto-paganism
- Cuius regio, eius religio
- Forced conversion of minority girls in Pakistan
- Forced monasticism
- Forced circumcision
- Inquisition
- Kakure Kirishitan
- Kirchenkampf
- Love jihad conspiracy theory
- Pact of Umar
- Religious conversion
- Religious discrimination
- Religious fanaticism
- Religious intolerance
- Religious persecution
- Religious segregation
- Religious violence
- Sectarian violence
- Supremacism#Religious
- State religion
- Vorpahavak
