= Hindu Jagran Manch =

Hindutva Organization

- Abbreviation: H.J.M.
- Formation: 1982; 44 years ago
- Founder: Vinay Katiyar
- Legal status: Active
- Region served: India

Hindu Jagran Manch also called H.J.M (translation: Forum for Hindu Awakening) is a right-wing Indian Hindu missionary group affiliated to the Rashtriya Swayamsevak Sangh (RSS). It focuses on religious conversion from Muslims and Christians to Hinduism. It was founded by Vinay Katiyar in 1982. It first came to public attention for its missionary programmes and religious violence in the tribal areas of the Dangs district of Gujarat in 1998. It and other similar affiliates Hindu Jagran Samiti, Hindu Jagran Samaj and Dharm Jagran Samiti have been implicated in aggressive Ghar Wapsi programmes in 2014–2015. On 25 December 2024, Hindu Jaragan March made headlines where workers of Teleglana Sub Unit threaten Zomato delivery man who wear santa to saffon.

== See also ==
- Ghar Wapsi
- Agra religious conversions 2014
- Hindutva
- Hindu terrorism
