= Parties and alliances in 2021 West Bengal Legislative Assembly election =

Indian state election groupings

The 2021 West Bengal Legislative Assembly election for 292 constituencies of the 294 constituencies in West Bengal was held between 27 March to 29 April 2021 in eight phases.

The incumbent All India Trinamool Congress government led by Chief Minister Mamata Banerjee won re-election by a large margin, despite opinion polls generally predicting a close race against the Bharatiya Janata Party, which became the Official Opposition but significantly underperformed expectations, winning 77 seats. The Sanjukta Morcha won just one seat, with the Indian National Congress and the leftist parties winning no seats.

These are the parties and alliances who contested 2021 West Bengal legislative assembly election:

== TMC and allies ==
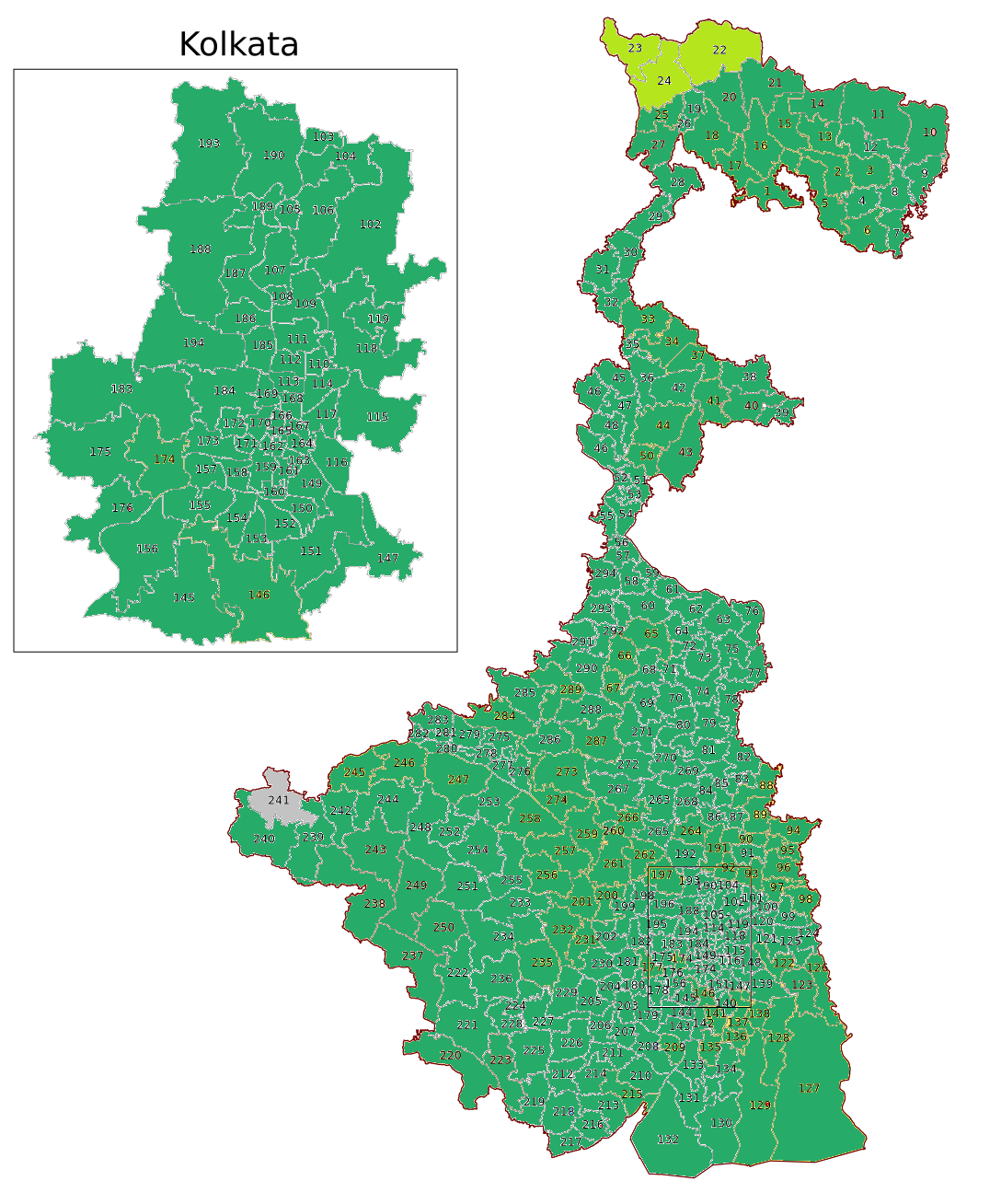
Map of the seat sharing arrangements of the All India Trinamool Congress for the 2021 West Bengal Legislative Assembly election.

Both factions of the Gorkha Janmukti Morcha (GJM) expressed support to Trinamool Congress for the assembly election. Trinamool Congress allotted three seats in the Darjiling to GJM, However the two factions of GJM, namely Gorkha Janmukti Morcha (Bimal) and Gorkha Janmukti Morcha (Tamang) declared to field their candidates in each of the three seats. Shiv Sena also endorsed Trinamool for the election. Trinamool Congress supported Independent candidate in Joypur after their candidate's nomination got cancelled.

Party		Symbol	Leader	Seats contested
All India Trinamool Congress	AITC		Mamata Banerjee	290
Gorkha Janmukti Morcha	GJM	Unrecognised	Bimal Gurung Binoy Tamang	3
Independent	N/A			1

== NDA ==
Five hill-based parties pledged support to BJP ahead of the assembly election (Gorkha National Liberation Front (GNLF), Communist Party of Revolutionary Marxists, Akhil Bharatiya Gorkha League (ABGL), Gorkhaland Rajya Nirman Morcha and SUMETI Mukti Morcha. Hindu Samhati, a right wing organisation in West Bengal, withdrew their support from the BJP initially and later declared to contest elections on its own. However, in the end they supported the BJP. BJP allotted a seat of Amta constituency to the president of Hindu Samhati to contest on BJP's symbol.

Map of the seat sharing arrangements of the Bharatiya Janata Party for the 2021 West Bengal Legislative Assembly election.

BJP also allotted the Baghmundi constituency, bordering Jharkhand, to the All Jharkhand Students Union (AJSU).

Party		Symbol	Leader	Seats
Bharatiya Janata Party	BJP		Dilip Ghosh	293
All Jharkhand Students Union	AJSU		Ashutosh Mahto	1

== Sanjukta Morcha ==
On 28 January 2021 Congress leader Adhir Ranjan Chowdhury announced that seat-sharing talks between the Congress and Left Front had concluded for 193 seats and that the remaining 101 seats would be decided at a later point. Out of the 193 seats agreed upon by 28 January, 92 went to Congress and 101 to the Left Front. These 193 seats included agreements over all the 77 seats the Congress and Left Front had won in the 2016 election. Left Congress and ISF announced that they will fight together in an alliance named as 'Sanyukta Morcha' from Brigade Rally on 28 February 2021. (It is worth mentioning here that Abbas Siddiqui had also sought an alliance with the TMC, before becoming part of the “Sanjukta Morcha”, with the Congress and Left parties.) ISF initially claimed that they have secured 30 seats from the Left Front's quota. After the final seat sharing agreement was concluded, it was announced that the Left Front will contest on 165 seats, Congress will contest on 92 seats and ISF will contest on 37 seats.

Left Front chairman Biman Bose announced candidates for first and second-phase elections on 5 March alongside Congress and ISF leaders leaving seats for them in the list. Indian National Congress revealed its first list of 13 candidates for the first two phases on 6 March. Left Front announced its second list of candidates on 10 March, consisting of several new and young faces from AISF, AIYF, SFI and DYFI along with some well-known veteran faces including ex-ministers of Left Front govt and ex-MPs. That day Biman Bose declared DYFI West Bengal state president Minakshi Mukherjee as the CPI(M) candidate for 'High-Profile' Nandigram Assembly constituency seat which was kept vacant in the first list published on 5 March. Congress revealed its second list of 34 candidates on 14 March. ISF released list of their first set of 20 candidates on the same day. Sanyukta Morcha announced 15 more candidates on 17 March consisting of 9 from the Left, 2 from Congress and 4 from ISF camp. Congress revealed its third list of 39 candidates on 20 March, and two more on 22 March.

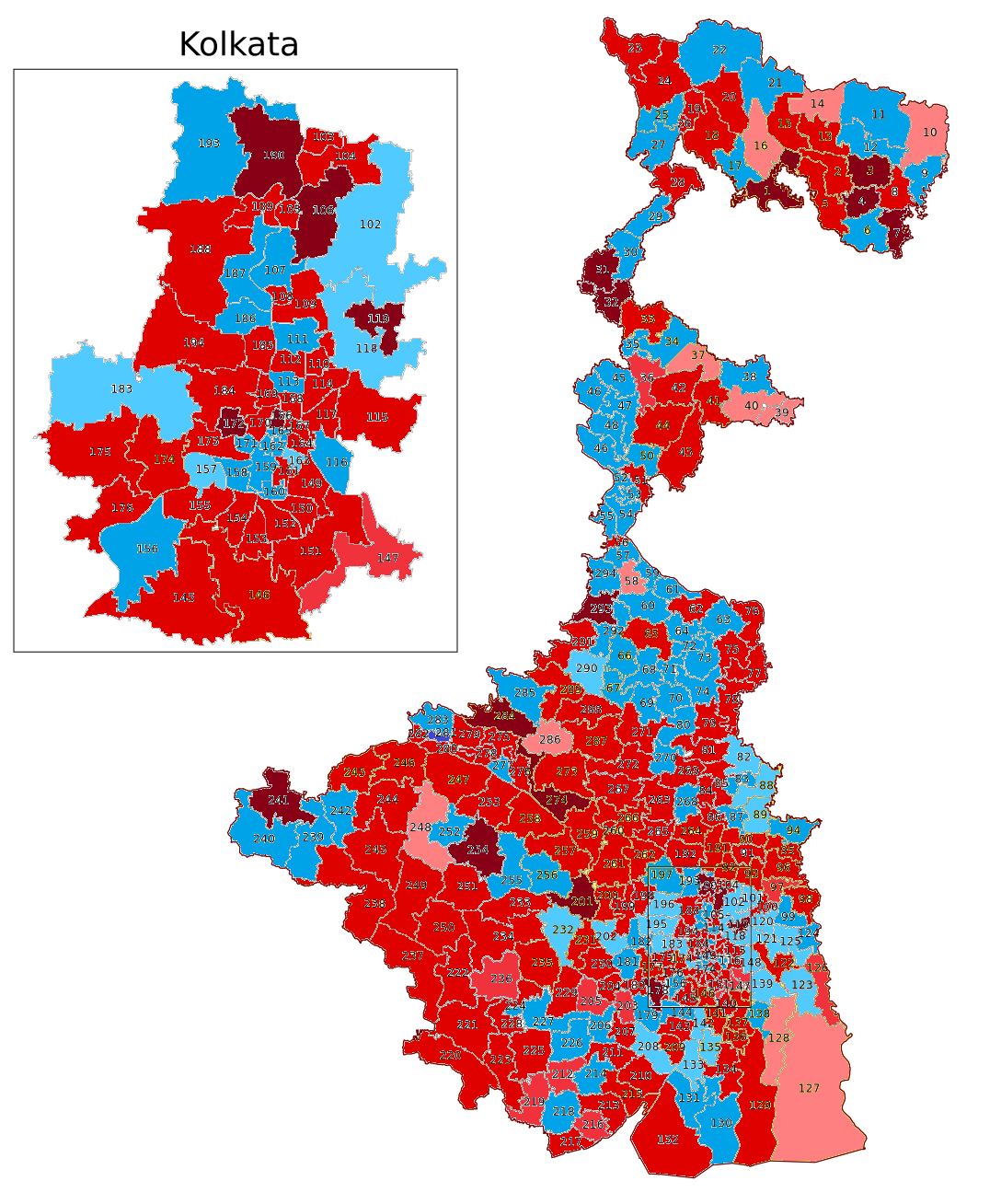
Map of the seat sharing arrangement between the parties of the Sanjukta Morcha for the 2021 West Bengal Legislative Assembly election.

Party		Symbol	Leader(s)	Bloc(s)	Seats contested
Communist Party of India (Marxist)	CPI(M)		Surjya Kanta Mishra	Left Front	138
All India Forward Bloc	AIFB		Debabrata Biswas	Left Front	21
Revolutionary Socialist Party	RSP		Biswanath Chowdhury	Left Front	11
Communist Party of India	CPI		Swapan Banerjee	Left Front	10
Marxist Forward Bloc	MFB		Samar Hazra	Left Front	1
Indian National Congress	INC		Adhir Ranjan Chowdhury	-	92
Indian Secular Front (Note: Indian Secular Front is an unregistered political party and currently contesting the election on "Envelope" symbol and name of Bihar based political party Rashtriya Secular Majlis Party.)	ISF		Abbas Siddiqui	-	32

== Others ==
Shiv Sena initially said that they would contest in around 100 seats, but later on 4 March 2021 announced that they would not contest and will instead support Mamata Banerjee and TMC from outside.

Party		Symbol	Leader(s)	Seats contested
Socialist Unity Centre of India (Communist)	SUCI(C)		Provash Ghosh	190
Janata Dal (United)	JD(U)		Sanjay Verma	16
Communist Party of India (Marxist–Leninist) Liberation	CPI(ML)L		Dipankar Bhattacharya	12
Communist Party of India (Marxist–Leninist) Red Star	CPI(ML) Red Star		K N Ramchandran	3
All India Majlis-e-Ittehadul Muslimeen	AIMIM		Asaduddin Owaisi	6
Bahujan Samaj Party	BSP		Mayawati	162
National People's Party	NPP			3
