= East Seram Regency =

Regency in Maluku, Indonesia

East Seram Regency Kabupaten Seram Bagian Timur
- Regency
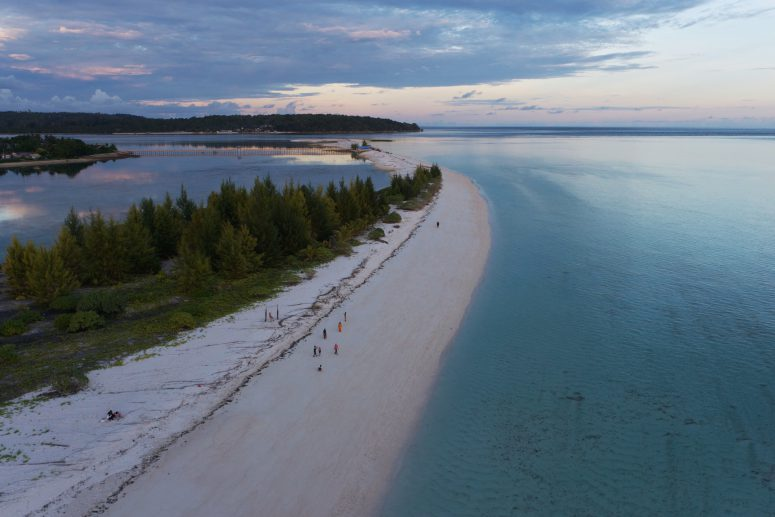
- Tanusang Geser beach

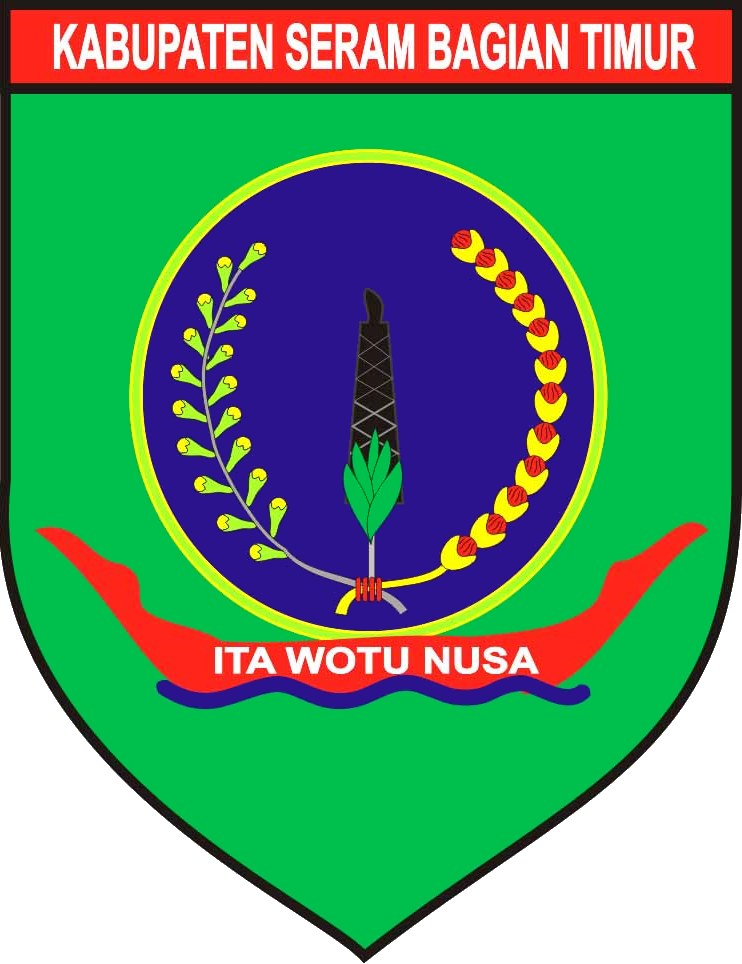
- Coat of arms
- Motto: Ila Wotu Nusa (We Build Regions)
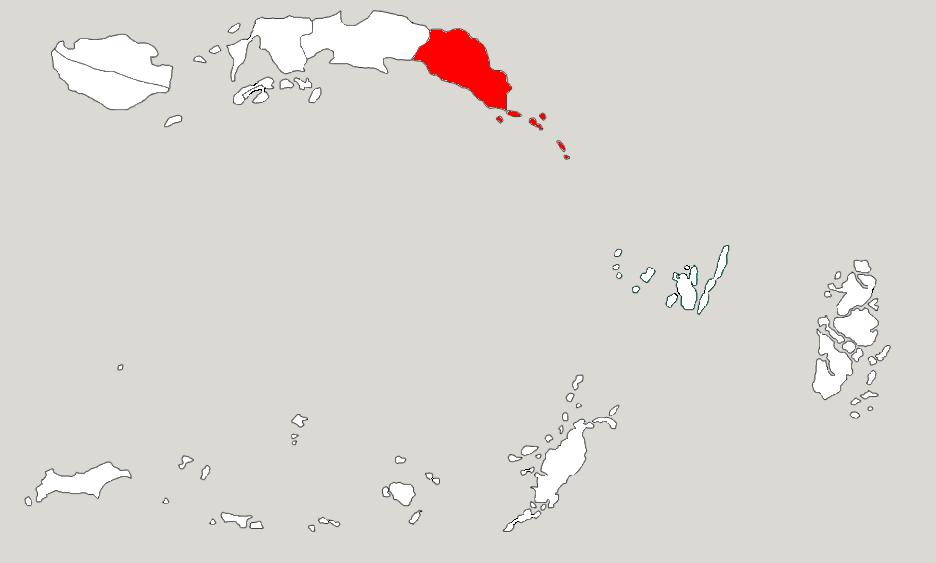
- Location within Maluku

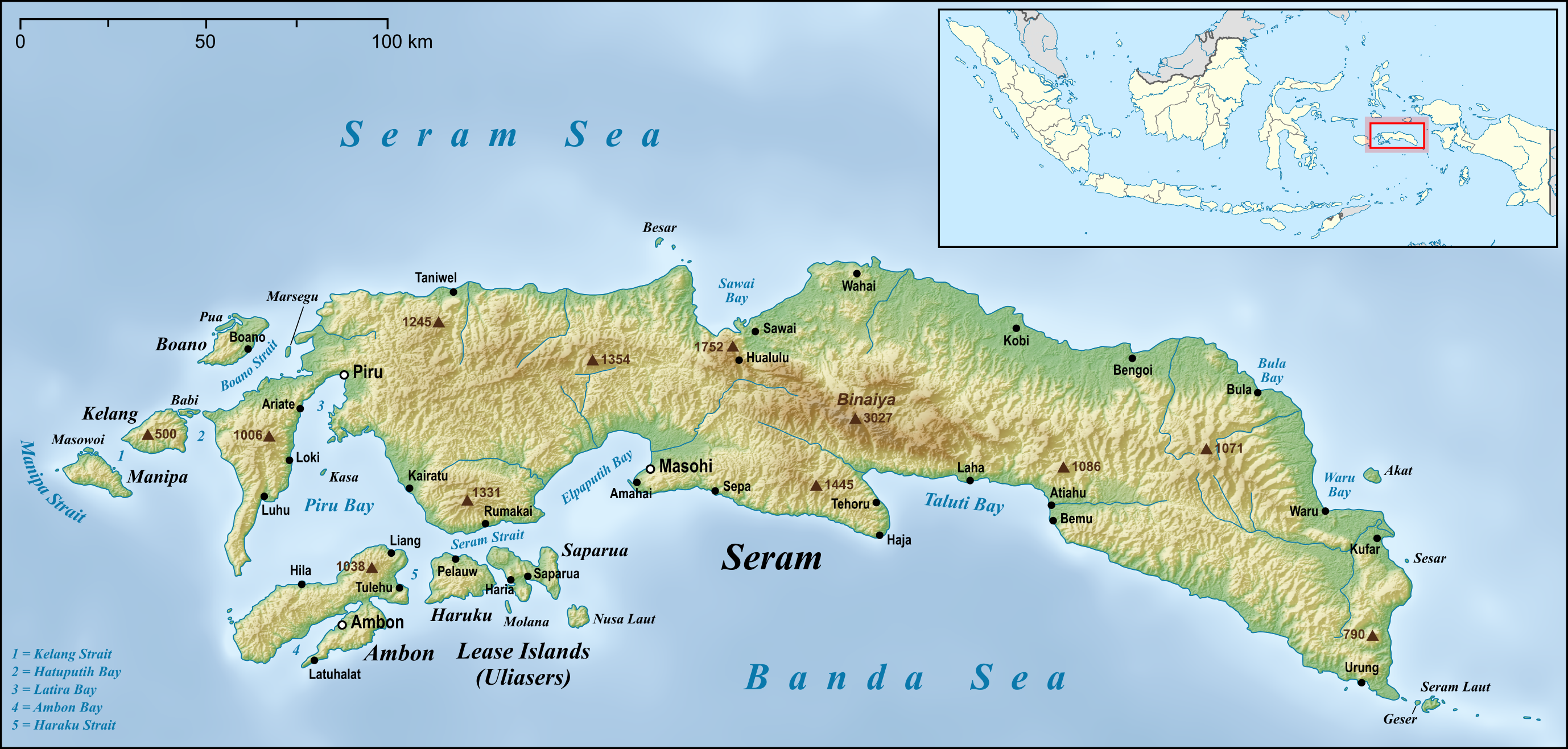
- Location in Seram, Maluku and Indonesia East Seram Regency (Maluku) East Seram Regency (Indonesia)
- Coordinates: 3.3985°S 130.3917°E
- Country: Indonesia
- Province: Maluku
- Capital: Bula

Government
  - Regent: Fachri Husni Alkatiri
  - Vice Regent: Muhammad Mifta Thoha

Area
  - Total: 5,725.51 km^{2} (2,210.63 sq mi)

Population (mid 2025 estimate)
  - Total: 142,234
  - Density: 24.8422/km^{2} (64.3409/sq mi)
- Time zone: UTC+9 (IEST)
- Area code: (+62) 911
- Website: serambagiantimurkab.go.id

East Seram Regency (Indonesian: Kabupaten Seram Bagian Timur) is a regency of Maluku (province), in Indonesia. It is mainly located on the island of Seram, but also includes smaller islands to the southeast comprising the Gorom and Watubela archipelagoes. Its only land boundary is with Central Maluku Regency which includes the central portion of Seram island.

The regency covers a land area of 5,779.12 km^{2}, and had a population of 99,065 at the 2010 Census and 137,972 at the 2020 Census; the official estimate as at mid 2025 was 142,234 (comprising 71,788 males and 70,446 females). The principal town lies at Bula, on Seram Island.

== Administrative divisions ==
At the time of the 2010 Census the regency was divided into six districts (kecamatan), an increase from the original four. The first four of these six districts were on the island of Seram; the other two covered the Gorom and Watubela archipelagoes, two groups of smaller islands situated to the southeast of Seram.

Subsequently, six additional districts were created in 2012 by the division of the original six districts, and a further three districts were created in 2014, so that the regency was divided into fifteen districts (kecamatan), then a sixteenth district (Ukar Sengan) was formed in 2025. Eleven of these are on the island of Seram (including small offshore islands) and five on the more substantive islands to its southeast. These are tabulated below with their present areas and their populations at the 2010 and 2020 Censuses, together with the official estimates as at mid 2025. The table also includes the locations of the district administrative centres, the number of administrative villages (all classed as rural desa) in each district, and its post code.

Kode Wilayah	Name of District (kecamatan)	Area in km^{2}	Pop'n Census 2010	Pop'n Census 2020	Pop'n Estimate mid 2025	Admin centre	No. of Villages	Post Code
81.05.01	Bula	658.80	24,037	26,023	27,686	Bula	10	97521
81.05.12	Bula Barat (West Bula)	802.69	^{(a)}	8,281	8,721	Waiketam Baru	13	97522
81.05.15	Teluk Waru (Waru Bay)	673.23	^{(a)}	5,279	5,941	Waru	11	97524
81.05.03	Werinama	1,232.70	9,752	6,165	5,868	Werinama	10	97525
81.05.07	Siwalalat	641.34	^{(b)}	6,585	6,912	Atiahu	12	97523
81.05.06	Tutuk Tolu	314.40	4,722	7,166	7,180	Air Kasar	11	97594
81.05.02	Seram Timur ^{(c)} (East Seram)	16.61	24,018	12,181	7,533	Geser	6	97592
81.05.08	Kilmury	807.91	^{(c)}	6,518	6,812	Kilmury	14	97591
81.05.13	Kian Darat	135.22	^{(c)}	6,297	6,567	Watu-Watu	10	97590
81.05.14	Siritaun Wida Timur (Lian Vitu)	206.78	^{(c)}	6,689	7,223	Keta Rumadan	10	97598
81.05.16	Ukar Sengan	42.33	^{(f)}	^{(f)}	4,874	Urung	10	97592
Sub-totals	on Seram Island	5,532.00	62,529	91,184	95,321		117	
81.05.04	Pulau Gorom (Gorom Island)	94.01	25,249	22,156	21,973	Kataloka	24	97593
81.05.11	Gorom Timur (East Gorom)	22.43	^{(d)}	9,420	9,663	Miran	23	97596
81.05.09	Pulau Panjang (Panjang Island)	19.999	1,913	2,691	2,706	Pulau Panjang	6	97599
81.05.05	Kesui Watubela ^{(e)}	35.04	9,251	9,321	9,271	Tamher Timur	18	97595
81.05.10	Teor (Teor Island)	22.04	2,556	3,200	3,300	Wermaf Kampung Tengah	10	97597
Sub-totals	Gorom and Watubela archipelagoes	193.51	38,969	46,788	46,913		81	

Notes: (a) The 2010 Census populations of Bula Barat and Teluk Waru Districts are included with the figures for Bula District, from which they were cut out.
(b) The 2010 Census population of Siwalalat District is included with the figure for Werinama District, from which it was cut out.
(c) The 2010 Census populations of Kilmury, Kian Darat, Lian Vitu (or Siritaun Wida Timur), and Ukar Sengan Districts are included with the figures for Seram Timur District, from which they were cut out.
(d) The 2010 Census population of Gorom Timur District is included with the figure for Pulau Gorom district, from which it and Pulau Panjang District were cut out.
(e) The 2010 Census population of Kesui Watubela (or Wakate) District excludes the figure for Teor District, which was cut out of it.
(f) Ukar Sengan District, which was only formed in 2025 from part of East Seram District, and inaugurated on 20 May 2025, was not included in the 2010 and 2020 censuses. Thus the figures for 2010 and 2020 are still included in those for East Seram District.
