= HJM =

HJM may refer to:

- Hans-Joachim Marseille, German Fighter Ace
- Heath–Jarrow–Morton framework, a financial model
- Herzog–Jackson Motorsports, a NASCAR team
- Higman-Janko-McKay group, in group theory
- Hindu Jagran Manch (Forum for Hindu Awakening), a Hindu nationalist organization in India
