= Tapan Ghosh =

Bengali Hindu nationalist leader (1953–2020)

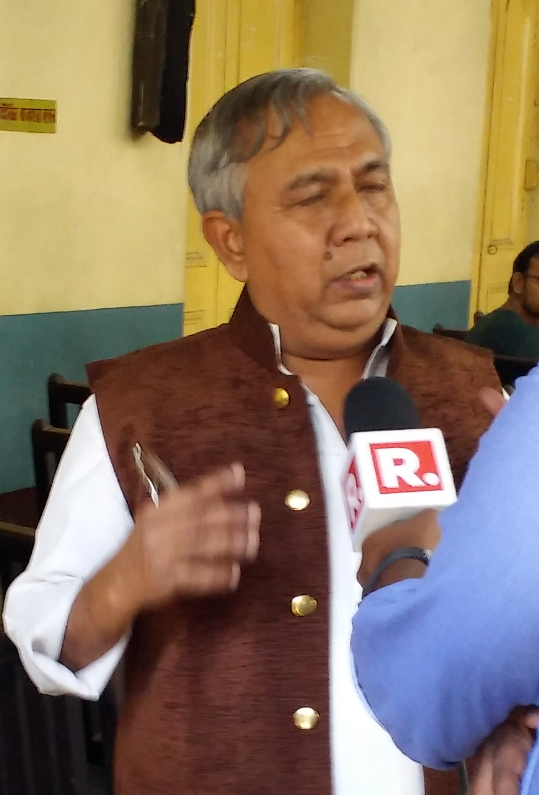
- Ghosh at Indian Association Hall, Kolkata in 2017.
- Born: Tapan Gangadhar Ghosh; 11 May 1953; Dakshinkhanda, Murshidabad, West Bengal
- Died: 12 July 2020 (aged 67); Kolkata, India
- Organization: Hindu Samhati
- Known for: Hindu nationalism

Tapan Ghosh (11 May 1953 – 12 July 2020) was a Hindu nationalist leader from West Bengal, India and founder of Hindu Samhati. He started his career as a member of RSS, later he formed his own organization Hindu Samhati.

== Early life ==
He was born in Dakshinkhanda, Murshidabad, West Bengal to Gangadhar Ghosh and Anima Ghosh. He was eldest of 3 children of his parents and had two younger sisters.

At the age of 13, he engaged with RSS. After completing school he went to Calcutta University and later completed his graduation in Physics. During his student life he entered student politics as a member of ABVP. He used to lead the “Buddha Amarnath Yatra” (Rajouri, J&K) with a large delegation. He traveled to different parts of India as a RSS pracharak including Meghalaya, Delhi, Kashmir, West Bengal, Tripura, Assam, Uttar Pradesh.

== Hindu Samhati ==
After serving more than three decades as a member of RSS, he left due to some ideological disputes and along with his followers, he started Hindu Samhati on 14 February 2008. His organisation mainly worked in the Eastern India, notably in West Bengal, Assam, and Jharkhand.

He and his organisation were also active in Ghar Wapsi programmes in his state and has also been arrested for other activities.

== Foreign invitations ==
He was invited by British parliamentarian Bob Blackman to the United Kingdom where Ghosh delivered his speech in Parliament committee room at Westminster, mainly about the plight of Bengali Hindus and the danger of Islam. He also went to the USA and Israel at the invitation of the different organizations (Hindu Congress of America, Indo-American Intellectual forum, and others) and also delivered his speech and held interviews.

== Death ==
In late June 2020, he contracted COVID-19. On 12 July 2020, after spending 15 days in hospital, Ghosh died at the age of 67 in Kolkata.

== See also ==
- Hindu Samhati
- Hindu nationalism
- Hinduism in West Bengal
- Ghar Wapsi
