= Watubela archipelago =

Archipelago in Maluku islands Indonesia

Coordinates: 4°35′44″S 131°41′55″E

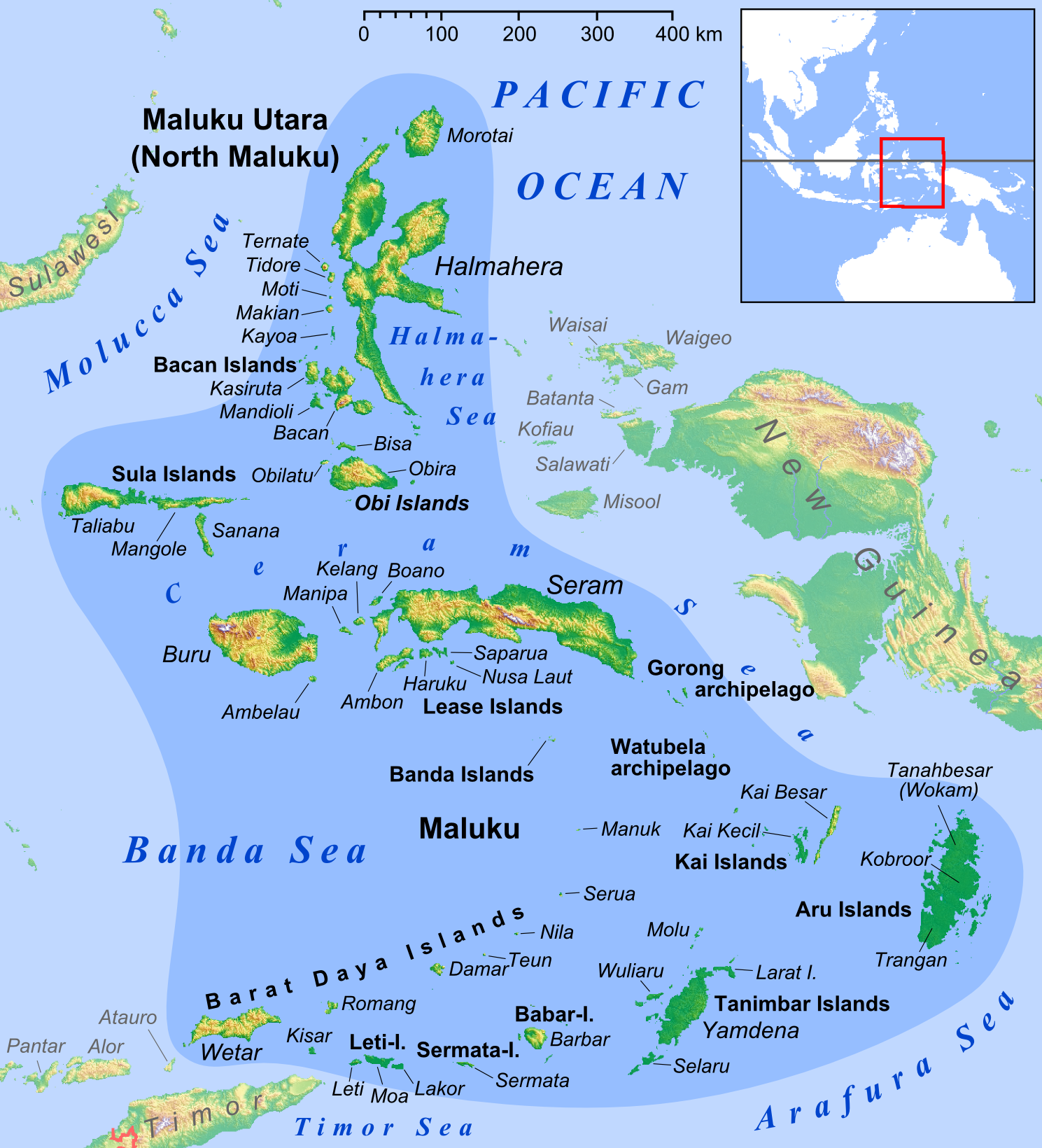
- Watubela archipelago in the east of Maluku Islands

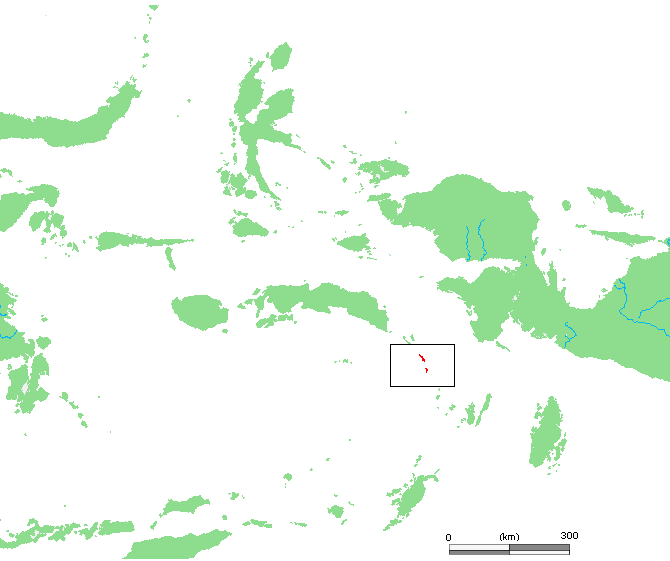
- Watubela archipelago (red) in eastern Indonesia

Geography
- Location: Southeast Asia
- Archipelago: Maluku Islands
- Major islands: Watubela, Kesui, Teor, Bama, Uta

Administration
- Indonesia
- Province: Maluku

Additional information
- Time zone: IEST (UTC+09:00)

Watubela is an archipelago in the Maluku Islands, east of Ceram and north of Kai Islands, southeast of the Gorong archipelago, and southwest of the Bomberai Peninsula of Papua, Indonesia. It includes the islands of Watubela itself, Kesui (also called Kasiui) and Teor (also called Tio'or). The total land area is 60.99 km^{2}, of which Watubela and Kesui together cover 37.58 km^{2} and Teor covers 23.41 km^{2}.

The islands now form two separate districts (kecamatan) within the East Seram Regency of Maluku. Kesui Watubela District (also called Wakate District) includes Watubela and Kesui Islands, with a number of smaller islands; it had 9,623 inhabitants as at mid 2022. Teor District consists of the island of the same name, together with Bama Island to its south, linked by an attenuated natural causeway; it had 3,303 inhabitants as at mid 2022.

The English naturalist Alfred Russel Wallace described the islands, which he called the Matabello Islands, in chapter 25 of his 1869 book The Malay Archipelago.
