= Dharm Jagaran Samiti =

Indian Hindu Nationalist Organisation

Dharma Jagaran Samiti (DJS, "Religious Awakening Committee"), also spelled Dharam Jagran Samiti, is a right-wing Hindu nationalist organisation and direct affiliate (gatividhi) of the Rashtriya Swayamsevak Sangh.

The DJS works across India and often sparks controversy owing to its far-right agenda against religious freedom. Some of its key agenda items include advancing Ghar Wapsi (conversion) to Hinduism from other religions, which is often fraught with accusations of coercion, and, conversely, opposing conversions from Hinduism (especially by tribal groups) The DJS also opposes religious proselytization and has participated in attacks against Christian churches that it perceives to be engaged in such activities.

The DJS promotes a Hindutva agenda regarding love jihad and land jihad, Islamophobic conspiracy theories that Muslims are attempting to coerce Hindu women into marriage and displace Hindu communities, respectively. In 2014, Dharam Jagran Samiti leader Rajeshwar Singh Solanki endorsed a plan to create a “pure and constructive society in Bharat” by ensuring that there were no Christians or Muslims in India by the end of 2021.
