= Bula, Indonesia =

Bula
- Kecamatan and town
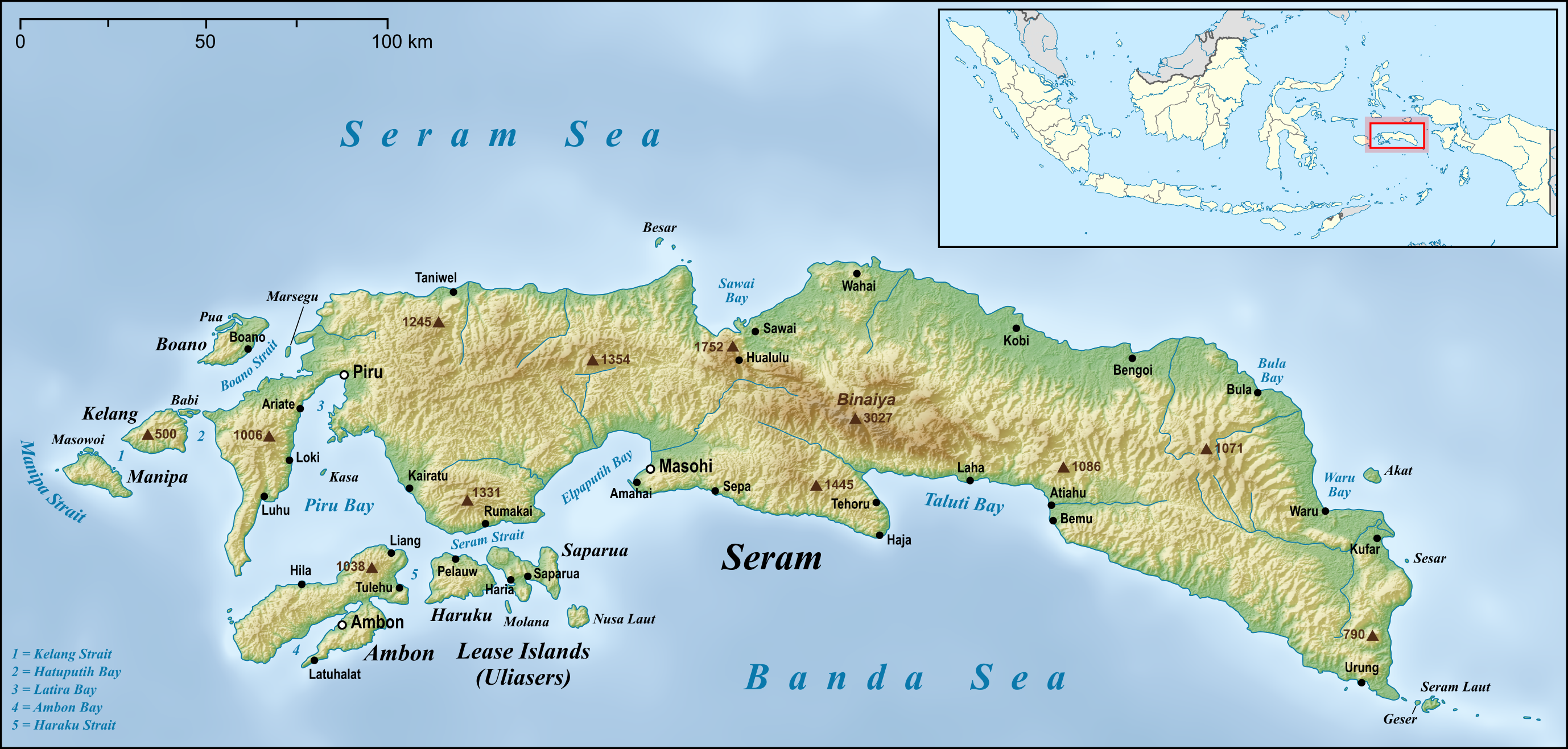
- Location in Seram Island
- Coordinates: 3°6′11″S 130°29′28″E
- Country: Indonesia
- Province: Maluku
- Regency: East Seram

Population (mid 2023)
  - Total: 26,695
- Time zone: UTC+9 (WITA)

Bula is a small town and kecamatan on the northeastern coast of the Indonesian island of Seram. It is the capital of the East Seram Regency. According to the 2010 census, the district had a population of 24,037 people, but it has subsequently been split into three separate districts, with the reduced Bula District having a population of 26,695 at mid 2023; within the district, the town of Bula had 12,890 inhabitants as at mid 2022. In the vicinity are the Bula Fields, with notable oil reserves, which were established in 1919. A number of people in the district speak the indigenous Masiwang language.
