= 2014 Agra religious conversions =

On 8 December 2014, Hindu nationalist groups affiliated to the Rashtriya Swayamsevak Sangh (RSS) were reported to have converted 100 – 250 Muslims to Hinduism in Agra. The functioning of the Indian Parliament was log-jammed in December. News reports indicated that Muslim right wing groups in India have received a ‘lease of life’ in trying to protest the conversions. After a full investigation, the Uttar Pradesh Minorities Commission concluded that the Muslims had not converted as they continued to "remain Muslims."

== The event ==
The BBC reports that 'some 250' Muslim residents of the Vednagar slum in Agra were told by 'a local Hindu activist' that if they attended a havan they would receive 'ration cards and basic amenities'. Times of India, reporting on the official Uttar Pradesh Minorities Commission investigation of the event, states that 200 Muslims (57 families) from the Madhunagar slum in Agra were a part of the event, 'fascinated' by the idea of receiving BLP ration cards for their participation. Times of India reports that the Dharam Jagran Samiti was behind the attempted conversion. India Today reports that there were 50 Muslim families in attendance, that the families were promised to receive homes during the event itself, and that the conversion was conducted by the Hindu Jagran Samiti.

Once the havan was over, the BBC reports that the local Hindu activist asserted that all the participants were informed that had become Hindu. India Today reports that the Hindu Jagran Samiti began to publicise the event as conversions the following day. One of the slum residents, Salina, stated that she was unaware that it was a conversion ceremony and that a Muslim man was forced to hold an idol. Another resident, however, Mumtaz, stated that she was not forced to attend and that everyone in attendance was there voluntarily.

Dharam Jagaran Samiti ("Religious awakening committee"), an activist group affiliated to the Hindu nationalist Rashtriya Swayamsevak Sangh (RSS) and part of its family of organisations Sangh Parivar, runs a programme called ghar wapasi ("homecoming"), whose objective is to convert Indian Muslims and Christians who they consider to have originally been Hindus. Therefore, their conversion to Hinduism is regarded as a "reconversion" or "homecoming." The 8 December conversion programme was also joined by the Agra based activists of Dharam Jagaran Samiti and the Bajrang Dal, a ceremony was performed that lasted a few hours.

Rajeswar Singh, the Aligarh area President of the Samiti, wrote an open letter asking for monetary help. He stated that the group had converted 40,000 Muslims and Christians in western Uttar Pradesh last year and started a target of 100,000 conversions for next year. He also stated that each activist who works to convert Muslims incurs an annual expenditure of 500,000 rupees and one that works to convert Christians requires 200,000 rupees. He sought monetary help from interested parties to run the programme of conversions.

The Agra Police registered a First Information Report (FIR) against Dharam Jagaran Samiti and its convener in the State Nand Kishore Valmiki, and launched an investigation. Cases were registered under Section 153(A) (promoting enmity between different groups) and Section 415 (using fraudulent means) of the Indian Penal Code, based on a complaint made by one of the participants that was converted. The FIR states that ration cards and housing plots were promised for those who converted to Hinduism. Valmiki was subsequently arrested on 16 December.

Another Hindu nationalist group, Hindu Jagaran Samiti, announced that it would hold the "biggest ever" conversion programme in the country in Aligarh on the day of Christmas. 5,000 Muslims and 1,000 Christians were said to be ready to get converted. Members of Parliament from Gorakhpur, Yogi Adityanath, and from Aligarh, Satish Gautam, have welcomed the announcement. Gautam declared in the Parliament, "We have been doing this (conversion) for several years and will do it again on 25th December. This is not a conversion but ‘ghar wapasi’ (home coming)."

== Reactions ==
The Uttar Pradesh Minorities Commission, which visited Agra on a fact-finding mission, has stated that the conversion programme was an "act of fraud."

The ruling party of India, Bharatiya Janata Party (BJP), which is itself a member of the RSS-affiliated Sangh Parivar, has distanced itself from the fraudulent conversions. Mukhtar Abbas Naqvi, the Minister of State for Parliamentary Affairs, has stated that State Police are taking action. The BJP President Amit Shah has stated that BJP had no role in the conversions. However, Vinay Katiyar, the BJP Member of Parliament from Uttar Pradesh and a former leader of Bajrang Dal, said that the conversions were voluntary. The Prime Minister Narendra Modi is reported to have told the party parliamentarians to keep the development agenda in focus and not cross the "Lakshman rekha" (line in the sand) regarding the issue of conversions.

The Minister of Parliamentary Affairs, Venkaiah Naidu, urged the opposition parties not to politicise the issue and said, "There is no threat to the integrity of the country [due to Agra mass conversion]".

In the Upper House of the Indian Parliament, all the opposition parties united under the Congress party's leadership, and demanded that the Prime Minister Narendra Modi should reply to the issue of forcible religious conversions. As the Prime Minister did not respond, the Parliament appeared to be log-jammed. The BJP challenged the opposition parties to support an "anti-conversion bill" that outlaws religious conversions using coercion and inducement.

The proposed conversion programme in Aligarh on the Christmas day has been blocked by the Uttar Pradesh Police. It will not be allowed under "any circumstance," said the Aligarh Police chief. The Dharam Jagaran Samiti has postponed its programme scheduled for the Christmas day, reportedly on orders from the Rashtriya Swayamsevak Sangh. But it said that the long-run conversion programmes will continue. "Our target is to make India a Hindu Rashtra by 2021. The Muslims and Christians don’t have any right to stay here. So they would either be converted to Hinduism or forced to run away from here," said the Samiti leader Rajeshwar Singh.

A Muslim cleric, Salim Ahmed, who heads the Babri Masjid Action Committee (BMAC), speaking at a programme of the organisation attended by 1,500 people, said that he would wage a war against the country if incidents of religious conversions were not checked. The video of his speech has been released to the public. Other Muslim religious groups have echoed the sentiment. The Darul Uloom of Deoband seminary plans to activate its conversion-prevention wing, Fitna-e-Irtehad, using its network of clerics nationwide. The Shahi Imam of Delhi's Jama Masjid declared that he would launch a ghar ghar Islam (Islam in every house) campaign to proselytise and renew the faith. "Muslims have sacrificed their lives for the unity of this country. Now be prepared to sacrifice your lives to save secularism," he said.

== Investigation ==
The Uttar Pradesh Minorities Commission, after having conducted a full investigation, said in February 2015 that the 250 Muslims had not converted because they continue to "remain Muslims." It maintained that there was "betrayal and cheating," and held the Local Intelligence Unit responsible for not identifying such "vulnerable areas." It confirmed the reports that the Hindu Jagaran Samiti had lured the Muslim families with the promise of houses offered by the national government. It misled them into thinking that the religious sacrificial ceremony was the beginning of the process, but announced the next day that the Muslims had converted to Hinduism. But the families refuted the claim that they had converted.

== See also ==
- Taqiyya, Islamic concept of concealing faith to protect from danger
- Laws against conversion in India
- Ghar Wapsi
- List of converts to Hinduism
- Shuddhi (Hinduism)
