= Gorong archipelago =

Islands in Indonesia

Gorong Kepulauan Gorom
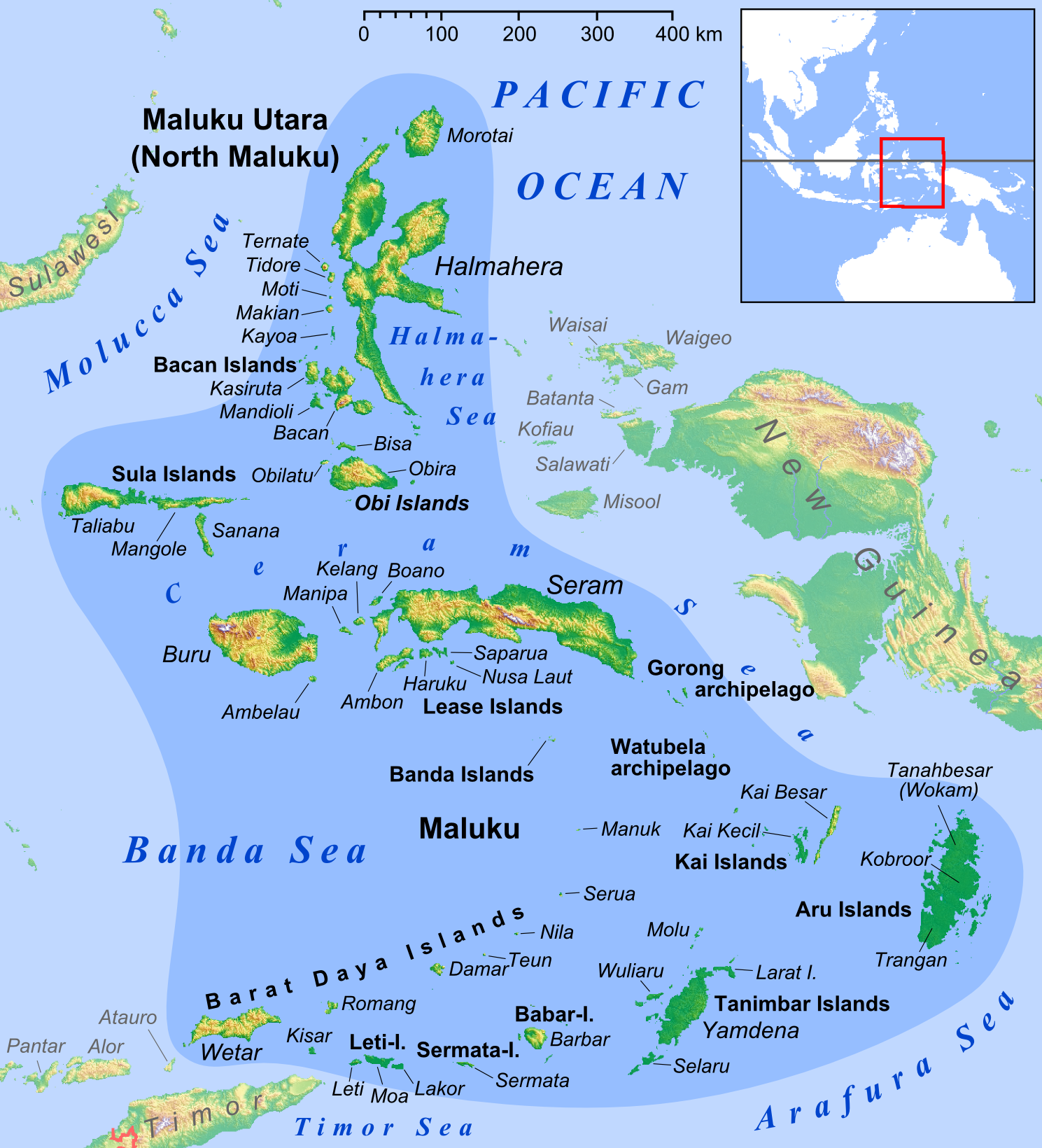
- Gorong archipelago in the east of Maluku Islands
- Interactive map of Gorong; Kepulauan Gorom

Geography
- Location: South East Asia
- Coordinates: 4°01′22″S 131°25′01″E
- Total islands: 3
- Major islands: Gorom, Panjang and Manawoka
- Area: 141.12 km^{2} (54.49 sq mi)

Administration
- Indonesia
- Provinces: Maluku

Demographics
- Population: 35,477 (mid 2022 estimate)
- Pop. density: 251.4/km^{2} (651.1/sq mi)
- Ethnic groups: Melanesian

The Gorom (formerly called Gorong) archipelago is a group of islands situated between the Watubela archipelago and Ceram in the Maluku Islands.

== History ==
The Nagarakretagama, an Old Javanese eulogy to king Hayam Wuruk of Majapahit written in 1365, mentions "Gurun" amongst the tributary countries of the kingdom.

The English naturalist Alfred Russel Wallace described the islands, which he called Goram, in chapter 25 of his 1869 book The Malay Archipelago.

== Islands ==
The archipelago has main three islands, plus a further 20-plus small offshore islands.

- Gorom, the biggest island, with the villages of Miran (Miren) on the east coast, Ondor (Ondur) in the northwest and Hur on its southwestern coast.
- Panjang to the west of Gorong, with Wisalem village in its southern end.
- Manawoku in the south, with the villages of Arbau in the north, Amar and Derra, and Nama in the south.

The islands now form three separate districts (kecamatan) within East Seram Regency of Maluku. Pulau Gorom District includes the western half of Gorom Island and the whole of Manawoku Island, plus some smaller islands; Gorom Timur District includes just the eastern half of Gorom Island; and Pulau Panjang District covers Panjang Island.

== Villages ==
(a) Pulau Gorom District

- 81.05.04.2001 Kataloka
- 81.05.04.2003 Amarsekaru
- 81.05.04.2004 Ondor
- 81.05.04.2005 Day
- 81.05.04.2006 Mida
- 81.05.04.2021 Loko
- 81.05.04.2022 Sera
- 81.05.04.2023 Kulugowa
- 81.05.04.2024 Rumeon
- 81.05.04.2031 Kelibingan
- 81.05.04.2032 Ilili
- 81.05.04.2042 Namalean
- 81.05.04.2043 Dulak
- 81.05.04.2044 Kilalir Kilwouw
- 81.05.04.2045 Kilotak
- 81.05.04.2046 Kilean
- 81.05.04.2047 Kaforing
- 81.05.04.2048 Arewang
- 81.05.04.2049 Usun Kataloka
- 81.05.04.2050 Buan Kataloka
- 81.05.04.2051 Rumanama Kotawouw Kataloka
- 81.05.04.2052 Sikaro Kataloka
- 81.05.04.2053 Aroa Kataloka
- 81.05.04.2054 Dada Kataloka

(b) Gorom Timur District

- 81.05.11.2001 Kilkoda
- 81.05.11.2002 Miran
- 81.05.11.2003 Kota Sirih
- 81.05.11.2004 Amarwatu
- 81.05.11.2005 Aran
- 81.05.11.2006 Tuha
- 81.05.11.2007 Bas
- 81.05.11.2008 Tunas Ilur
- 81.05.11.2009 Sagey
- 81.05.11.2010 Armada
- 81.05.11.2011 Waisalan
- 81.05.11.2012 Basarin
- 81.05.11.2013 Goha
- 81.05.11.2014 Rarat
- 81.05.11.2015 Miran Gota
- 81.05.11.2016 Adar
- 81.05.11.2017 Tinarin
- 81.05.11.2018 Etaralu
- 81.05.11.2019 Kiltufa
- 81.05.11.2020 Miran Kilian
- 81.05.11.2021 Miran Keledar
- 81.05.11.2022 Miran Manaban
- 81.05.11.2023 Miran Rumuar

(c) Pulau Panjang District

- 81.05.09.2001 Pulau Panjang
- 81.05.09.2002 Argam
- 81.05.09.2003 Lalasa
- 81.05.09.2004 Magat
- 81.05.09.2005 Ruku Ruku
- 81.05.09.2006 Perik Basaranggi
