= Manjhi (tribe) =

Community in the Indian states of Madhya Pradesh and Bihar

Manjhi, sometimes recorded as Majhwar and as Majhi, is a community in the Indian states of Madhya Pradesh and Bihar, where they are classified as a Scheduled Tribe for the purposes of India's system of positive discrimination, however, Majhi from West Bengal and Odisha fall separately.

== Notable people ==
- Dashrath Manjhi, also known as the Mountain Man of Bihar
- Jitan Ram Manjhi, former Chief Minister of Bihar
- Tilka Majhi, was an Indian tribal leader who led a rebellion against British rule from 1771 to 1785
