= Ghar Wapsi =

Religious campaign in India

Ghar Wapsi (Hindi, lit. 'Returning Home') is the programme of religious reconversion to Hinduism (and, to a lesser extent, Sikhism) from Islam, Christianity, and other religions in India conducted by Indian Hindutva organisations such as Vishva Hindu Parishad (VHP) and Rashtriya Swayamsevak Sangh (RSS), and also overseas such as in Indonesia. Various scholars argue that Indian Muslims and Christians largely descend from local populations who gradually converted over time. DNA studies suggest shared Ancestral North Indian–Ancestral South Indian ancestry and geographic clustering across communities. Anthropological research suggests continuity of indigenous populations. Evidence indicates local origin with later religious conversion rather than large-scale foreign ancestry. The term owes to the Hindutva ideology that all people of India are ancestrally Hindu and, hence, conversion to Hinduism is one of "returning home" to their ancestral roots.

The programme became a subject of public discussion in 2014. The Bharatiya Janata Party's Yogi Adityanath has claimed this campaign would continue unless conversions to other religions are banned altogether in the country.

The Vishva Hindu Parishad and the Rashtriya Swayamsevak Sangh organised several Ghar Wapsi events in Telangana, Andhra Pradesh, Kerala, and Goa. The Indian Express reported that certain Manjhi families, who are a Scheduled Caste, demanded better facilities along with education and healthcare before they converted.

In a Supreme Court judgement, the judges ruled that reconversion to Hinduism will not prevent a person from accessing quota benefits and adopt the caste of his forefathers. The bench further held that the "Scheduled Caste persons belonging to Hindu religion, who had embraced Christianity with some kind of hope or aspiration, have remained socially, educationally and economically backward."

In Indonesia, Sudhi Wadani is a ceremony in Balinese Hinduism for individuals converting to the religion, aimed at "purifying" them from the influences of previous beliefs. The ceremony involves several stages, including cleansing with holy water (melukat), spiritual purification, chanting sacred mantras, and offering to Hindu gods. The process symbolises the individual's release from past spiritual ties and marks their official acceptance into the Balinese Hindu community. Led by a priest or spiritual guide, Sudhi Wadani is believed to ensure that the person is spiritually ready to begin their journey in Hinduism, following its teachings, ceremonies, and traditions.

== Etymology ==
The word ghar is of Hindi origin which means "home". The word wapsi is of Persian origin which means "to return".

This term indicates the belief held by the organisations facilitating such programmes that most of the Muslims and Christians in India have descended from Hindus, and hence are returning to their "home" through reconversion.

== Historical precedence ==
There have been multiple cases of individuals and communities applying for reconversion into their old faith. Kulkarni has given instances of reconversion in Maharashtra region from early modern times. He claims that there was also reluctance on Hindu society of that period to accept people back into the fold but upon pressure from rulers such as Shivaji, the reconversion was allowed. More serious objections were raised when a community desired to return to their Hindu caste after many generations. During Shivaji's rule a group of Panchkalshi converts wanted to return, however the caste council (Got Sabha) raised objections and Shivaji and later Sambhaji had to postpone decision on the matter. The rules on reconversion became tighter under Peshwa rule in mid and late 1700s.

== Major instances ==
=== Maharashtra ===
Around 251 Christian families from Boisar in Palghar reconverted to Hinduism during a ‘Ghar Wapsi’ ceremony on Hanuman Jayanti. The event was organised by Vishva Hindu Parishad and Bajrang Dal after months of outreach efforts targeting tribal families. Over 500 individuals participated in the reconversion, which includes traditional purification rituals like yajna and shuddhikaran. The programme aims to bring back families who had converted to Christianity decades earlier.

=== Telangana and Andhra Pradesh ===
More than 8,000 people in Telangana and Andhra Pradesh converted to Hinduism from July 2014 - December 2014 under the Ghar Wapsi programme. According to a VHP official, 1,200 people converted to Hinduism in a Ghar Wapsi event in Hyderabad.

In October 2019, 500 Christian Dalits in Andhra Pradesh were convinced to become Hindu and promise to never go to church again.

=== Jharkhand ===
In April 2017, at least 53 tribal Christian families converted to Hinduism as part of the RSS's "Christianity-free" block campaign in Arki, Jharkhand. And at least seven other Christian families underwent a Shuddhikaran (purification ceremony) in Kochasindhri village.

In March 2021, 181 Christians in Garhwa district were converted to the tribal Sarna religion.

=== Punjab ===
Between 2011 and 2014, about 8,000 Christians in Punjab were converted to Sikhism. Most of the reconversion was done in the Hoshiarpur district, followed by Amritsar and Batala.

In September 2022, about 500 Christians reconverted to Sikhism in the Amritsar district. 56 families were reconverted to Sikhism from Christianity in the border area villages of Punjab.

=== West Bengal ===
More than 100 tribal Christians were converted to Hinduism in West Bengal's Birbhum district.

On 15 February 2018, an organisation called Hindu Samhati led by Tapan Ghosh organised “Ghar Wapsi” with 16 members of a Muslim family, who had “been reverted to Hinduism”, being showcased on the dais of outfit Hindu Samhati.

=== Uttar Pradesh ===
During Agra religious conversions 2014, it was claimed that 100 – 250 Muslims converted to Hinduism. In May 2017, RSS performed conversion of at least 22 Muslims, including women and children, into Hinduism in a secretive ceremony at an Arya Samaj temple in Ambedkar Nagar district of Faizabad, Uttar Pradesh.

In Bulandshahr, more than 100 Christians converted to Hinduism in 2022.

=== Tripura ===
In January 2019, 96 Tribal families that converted to Christianity 9 years prior, underwent Ghar Wapsi to reconvert back to Hinduism. The event took place in Kailashahar in Unakoti district in Tripura. The event was done by the Hindu Jagaran Mancham, an affiliate of the RSS, and the Vishwa Hindu Parishad (VHP).

=== Kerala ===
In 2015, about 35 people were reportedly converted to Hinduism at an event organised by the Vishwa Hindu Parishad (VHP) in Alappuzha. In 2015, 35 people converted to Hinduism in Kottayam district. They were Dalit families who had converted to Christianity a few generations back.

In 2021, 209 Christians and 32 Muslims converted to Hinduism.

=== Tamil Nadu ===
In 2015, first Ghar Wapsi happened in Tamil Nadu where 18 Dalit Christians reconverted to Hinduism by a ceremony done by the Hindu Makkal Katchi.

=== Gujarat ===
In 2020, 144 tribal Hindus who converted to Christianity many years ago converted back to Hinduism in Dang district, Gujarat by the Agniveer organisation.

=== Chhattisgarh ===
In 2021, 1,200 people were reconverted to Hinduism from Christianity in Chhattisgarh's Jashpur.

In January 2023, 1,100 people were converted to Hinduism from Christianity in the presence of BJP's Chhattisgarh state minister Prabal Pratap Singh Judev.

== Reception ==
Secular groups, religious groups such as Open Doors, and political parties like the Indian National Congress are critical of Ghar Wapsi, when it is done with the state's support, as they say that it threatens freedom of religion in the country.

== See also ==
- Shuddhi
- Dayanand Saraswati
- Swami Shraddhanand
- 2014 Agra religious conversions
- Love Jihad
- Netaji Palkar
- Bukka Raya I
