= Hindu Samhati =

Bengali Hindu advocacy organisation

- Abbreviation: HS
- Formation: 14 February 2008 (18 years ago)
- Founder: Tapan Ghosh
- Legal status: Active
- Region served: India
- President: Santanu Singha
- Website: https://www.hindusamhati.in

Hindu Samhati is a far right Hindutva organisation founded on 14 February 2008 by Tapan Ghosh. The organisation supports the Bharatiya Janata Party and its main aim is to help propagate Hindutva among Bengalis. The organisation in based in West Bengal. Its main slogan is "Jai Shree Ram" and it is attempting to run an anti-Love Jihad campaign in Bengal.

== History ==
The organisation was founded in February 2008 by Tapan Ghosh after he was separated from the Rashtriya Swayamsevak Sangh due to the ideological conflicts and the working of the RSS. He and his followers formed a separate organisation with a Bengali branding of Hindutva.
