= Teor (island) =

Island in Indonesia

Coordinates: 4°45′S 131°45′E

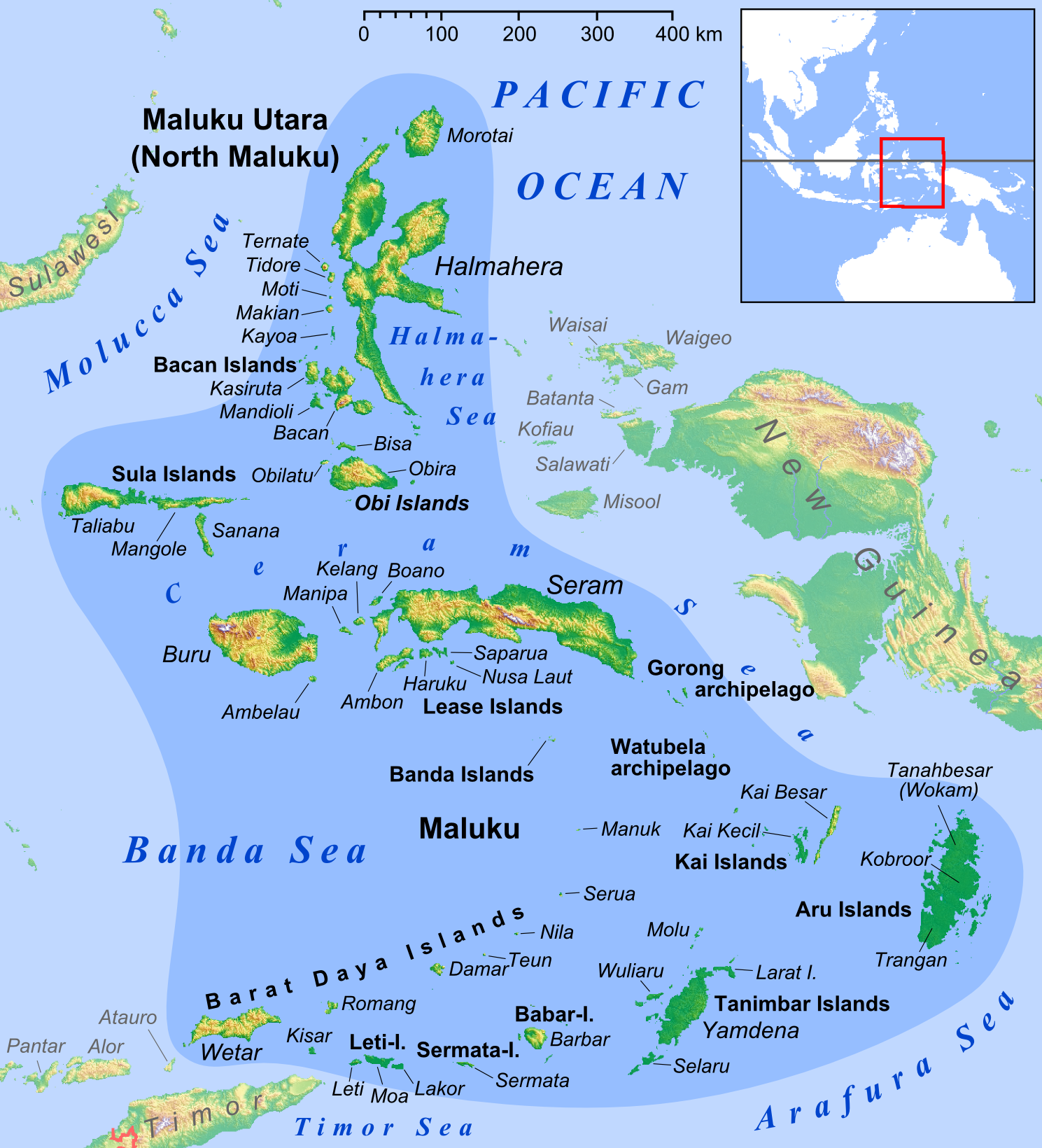
The Moluccas

Teor is an island in the Indonesian province of Maluku (the Moluccas). It is also known as Pulau Tior, Tior, Tio'or and Téhor. The island has an area of 23.41 km^{2} and had a population of 2,556 at the 2010 Census and 3,200 at the 2020 Census.

Teor is located at 4°45'0" North and 131°45'0" East. It is in the time zone GMT+8.

The Teor language is one of the Malayo-Polynesian languages in the Austronesian language family (ISO 639-3). It had 1,100 native speakers in 1986.
