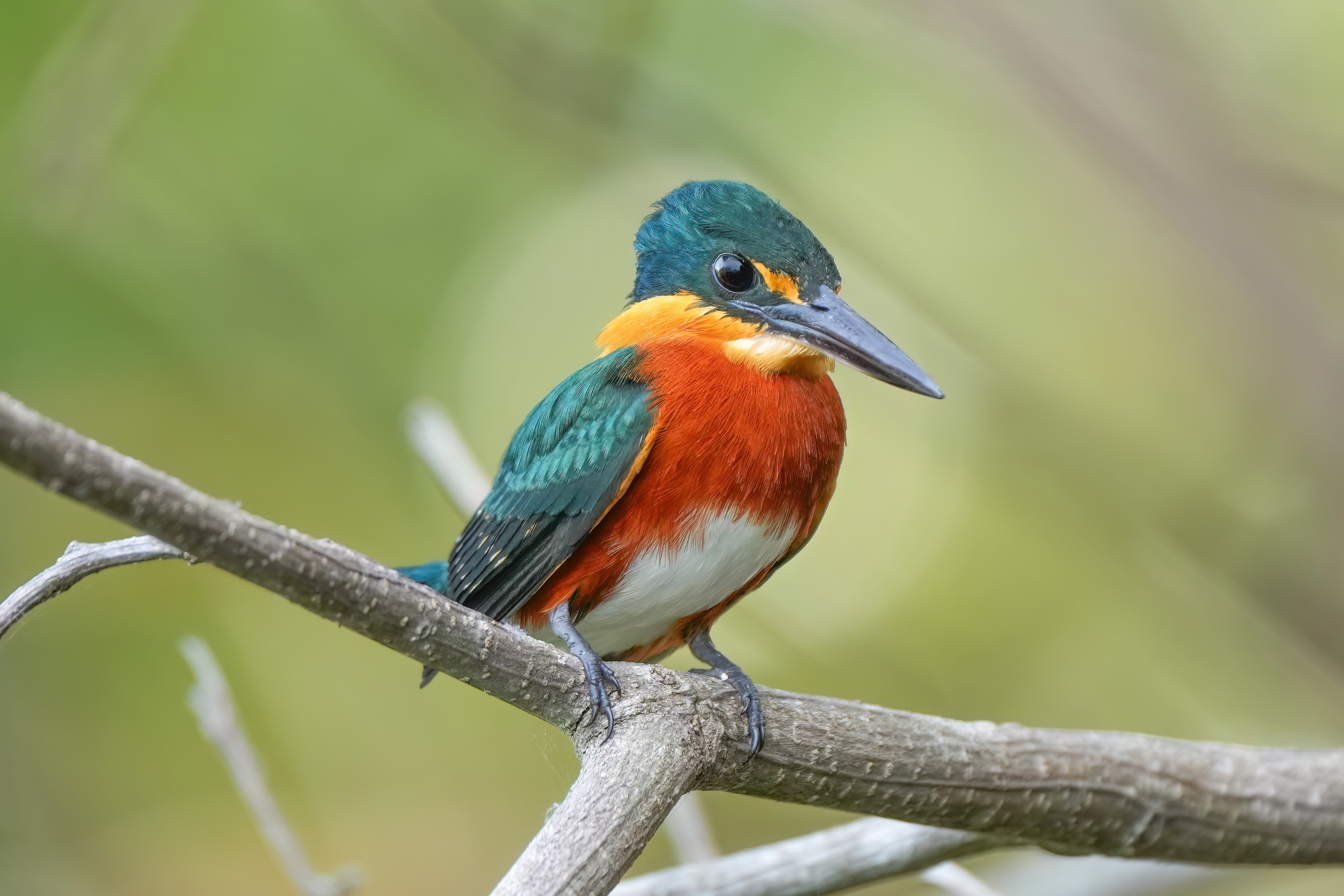
- Male C. aenea in Pantanal, Brazil
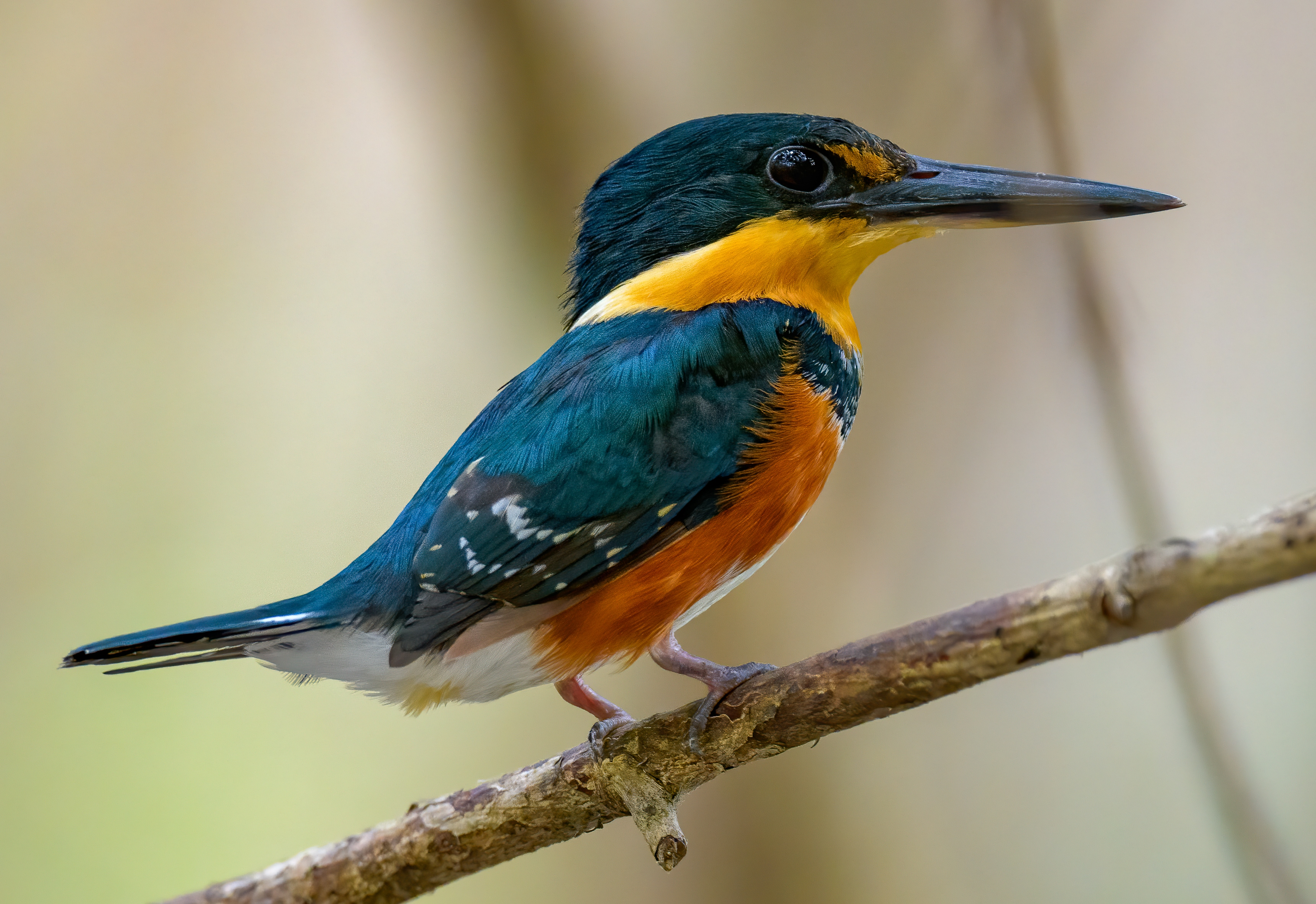
- Female C. aenea stictoptera in Costa Rica

Conservation status
- Least Concern (IUCN 3.1)

Scientific classification
- Kingdom: Animalia
- Phylum: Chordata
- Class: Aves
- Order: Coraciiformes
- Family: Alcedinidae
- Subfamily: Cerylinae
- Genus: Chloroceryle
- Species: C. aenea

Binomial name
- Chloroceryle aenea (Pallas, 1764)
- resident range

Synonyms
- Alcedo aenea Pallas, 1764; Alcedo superciliosa Linnaeus, 1766

= American pygmy kingfisher =

Species of bird

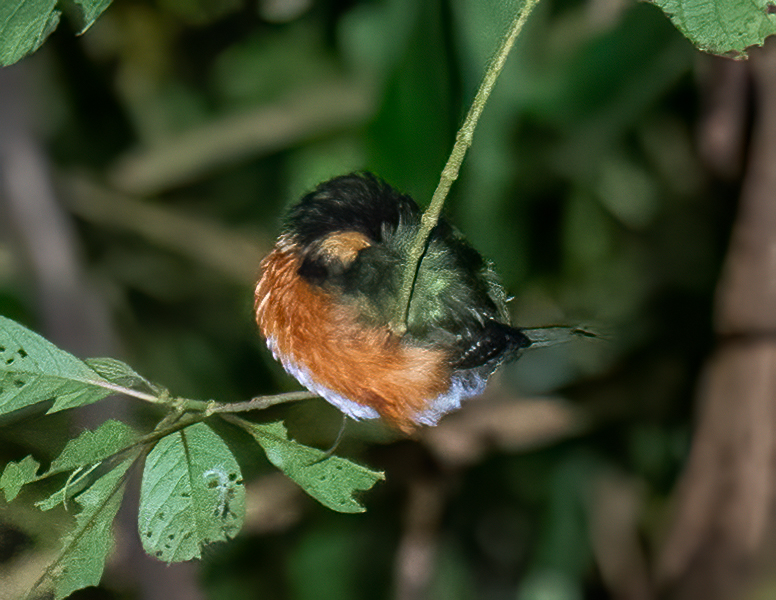
Pygmy kingfisher asleep in Costa Rica

The American pygmy kingfisher (Chloroceryle aenea) is a species of "water kingfisher" in subfamily Cerylinae of family Alcedinidae. It is found in the American tropics from southern Mexico south through Central America into every mainland South American country except Chile and Uruguay. It also occurs on Trinidad.

== Taxonomy and systematics ==
The first formal description of the American pygmy kingfisher was by the German zoologist Peter Simon Pallas in 1764 under the binomial name Alcedo aenea. The specific epithet aenea is from the Latin aeneus meaning "of a bronze colour". The current genus Chloroceryle was erected by Johann Jakob Kaup in 1848.

A molecular phylogenetic study published in 2006 found that the American pygmy kingfisher was a sister species to a clade containing the green-and-rufous kingfisher (C. inda) and the green kingfisher (C. americana).

Two subspecies are currently recognized, the nominate C. a. aenea (Pallas, 1764) and C. a. stictoptera (Ridgway, 1884).

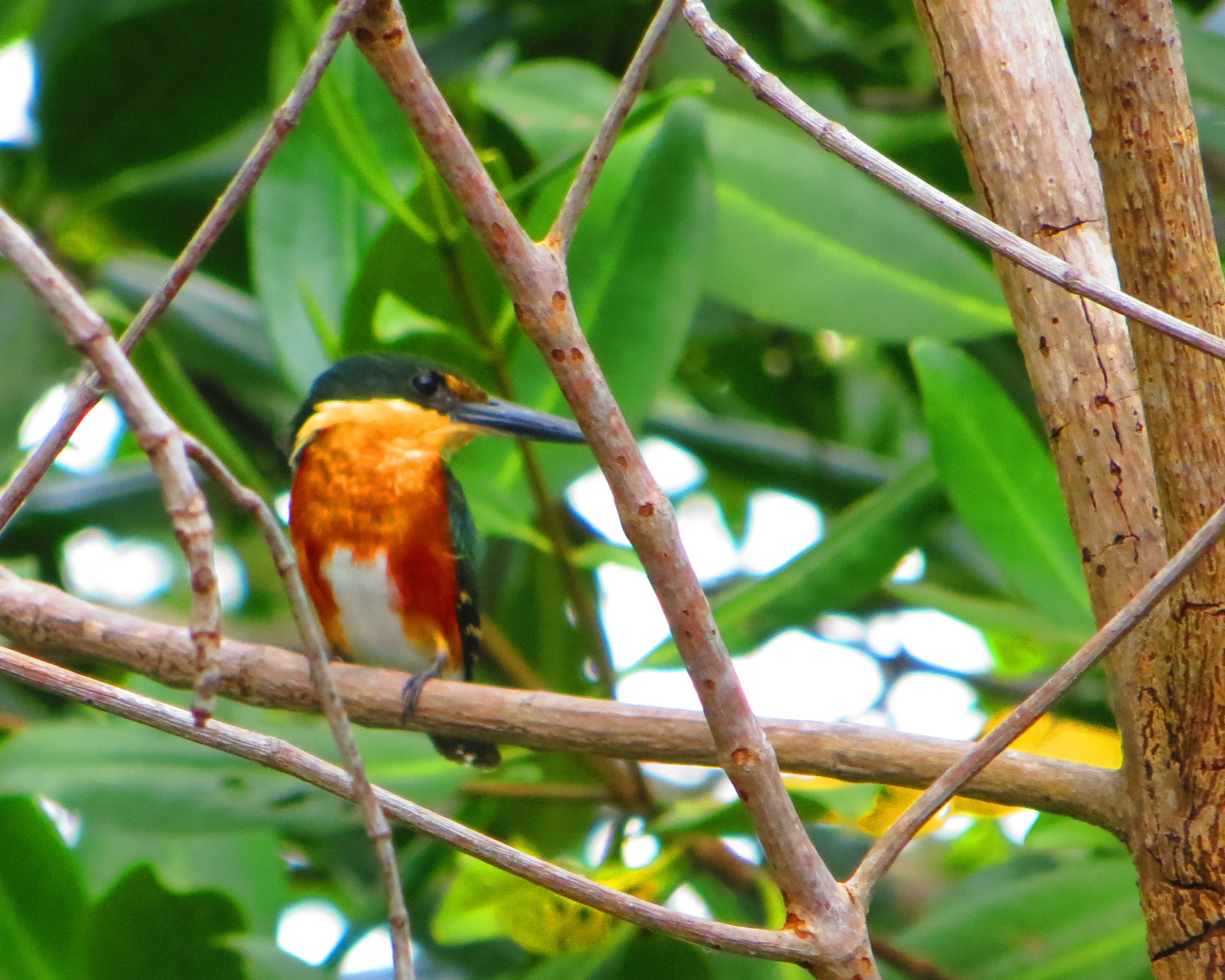
At Reserva Natural Isla de Juan Venado, León Department, Nicaragua

== Description ==
The American pygmy kingfisher is about 13 cm (5.1 in) long. Males weigh 10 to 16 g (0.35 to 0.56 oz) and females 12 to 16 g (0.42 to 0.56 oz). It has the typical kingfisher shape, with a shaggy crest and long heavy bill. The bill is black with some pale yellow at the base of the mandible and its legs and feet are pinkish to light gray. Males of the nominate subspecies have a dark glossy green head and upperparts with a golden wash separated by a narrow rufous collar. Their tail is a bluer green. They have black lores with a thin rufous line in front of the eye. Their chin, throat, and most of their underparts are rufous that is deeper on the breast and flanks. The center of their breast and their undertail coverts are white. Adult females are similar with the addition of a dark green band across their upper breast. Juveniles have paler underparts than adults and buffy spots on their wings; males have green-black streaks on their breast and females' breast band is often incomplete. Subspecies C. a. stictoptera has obvious lines of white spots on their secondaries and some white on the rump. The two forms intergrade in central Costa Rica.

== Distribution and habitat ==
Subspecies C. a. stictoptera of American pygmy kingfisher is the more northerly of the two. It is found from the southern Mexican states of Puebla, Veracruz, Yucatán, and Chiapas south through Belize, Guatemala, El Salvador, Honduras, and Nicaragua to central Costa Rica. The nominate subspecies is found from central Costa Rica (where it overlaps stictoptera) through Panama into Colombia. From there it occurs west of the Andes to central Ecuador and east and south into Venezuela, the Guianas, and most of Amazonian Colombia, Brazil, Peru, and Bolivia. Its range extends slightly into Paraguay and Argentina and also includes Trinidad.

The American pygmy kingfisher inhabits dense forest, where it occurs along small streams and rivers, beside pools, in swamps, and along tidal channels in mangroves. It shuns open landscapes. In elevation it ranges from sea level to 2,600 m (8,500 ft).

== Behavior ==
=== Movement ===
The American pygmy kingfisher is assumed to be sedentary.

=== Feeding ===
The American pygmy kingfisher hunts from a low perch from which it dives into water for its prey. Its diet includes small fish such as those of families Characidae and Cyprinodontidae, tadpoles and frogs, and large insects such as damselflies. It has been reported but not confirmed that it catches insects on the wing.

=== Breeding ===
The American pygmy kingfisher's breeding season varies geographically, apparently from January in Mexico to as late as September in Trinidad. Both members of a pair excavate a burrow in a river bank, road cutting, gravel pit, arboreal termitarium, or the root ball of a fallen tree. it is typically 30 to 40 cm (12 to 16 in) long and has a nest chamber at the end. The clutch size is three or four eggs. The incubation period and time to fledging are not known.

=== Vocalization ===
The American pygmy kingfisher makes a "[w]eak, repeated 'tik' or 'dzit, tsweek' sometimes faster as a rattle or chatter". What is thought to be its song is "a series of musical chirps."

== Status ==
The IUCN has assessed the American pygmy kingfisher as being of Least Concern. It has a very large range. Its estimated population of at least a half million mature individuals is, however, believed to be decreasing. No immediate threats have been identified.
