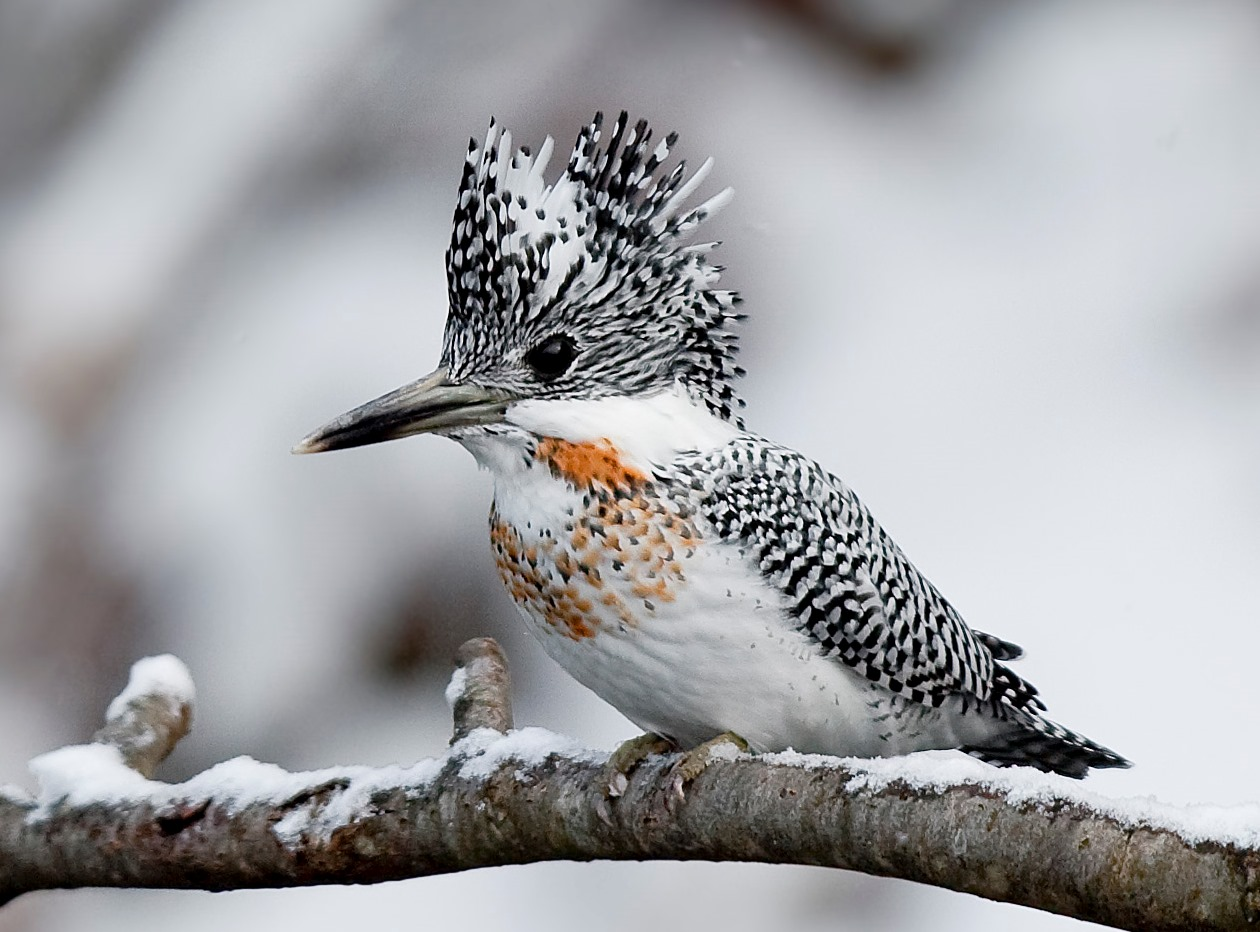

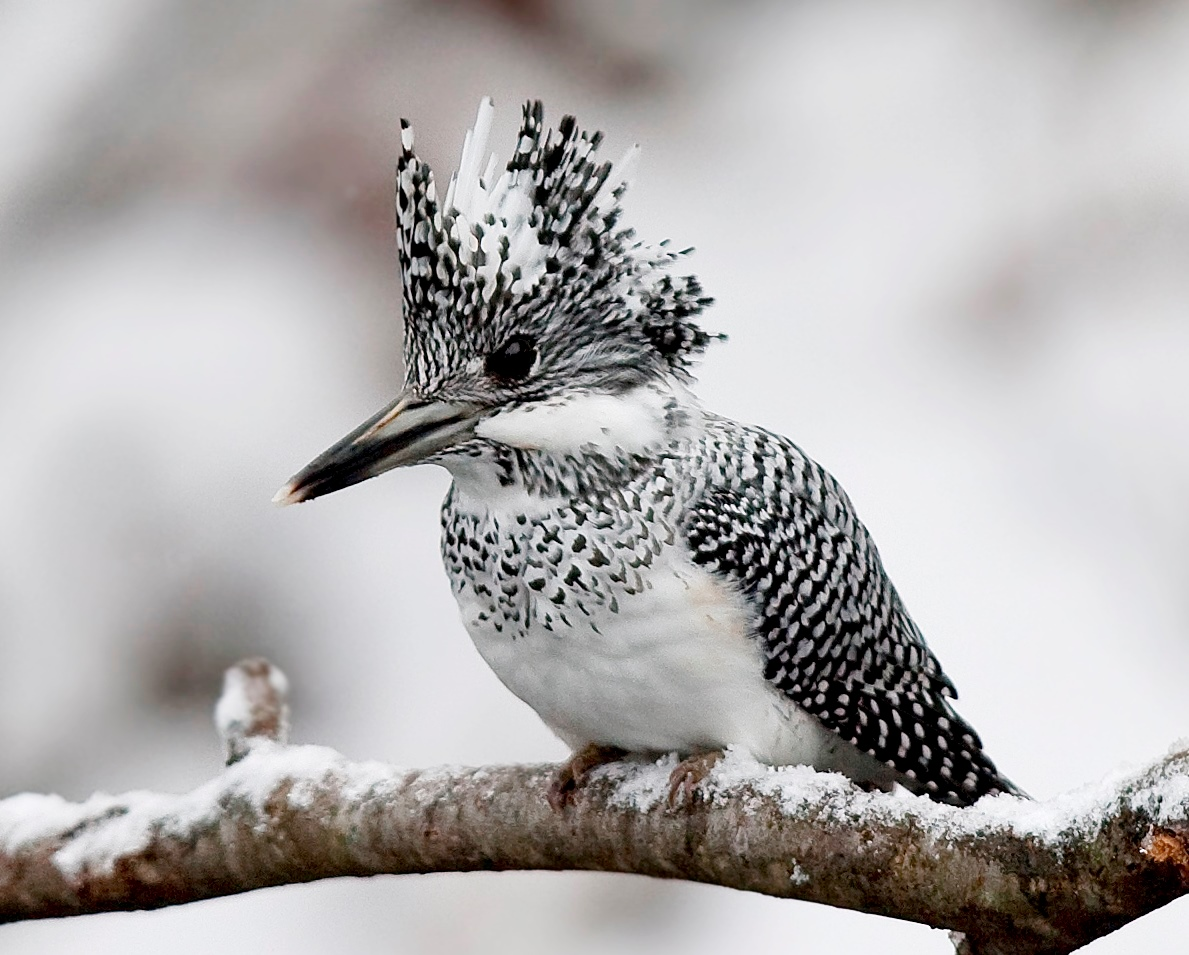
- Male (top) and female (bottom) M. lugubris subsp. pallida at Asahikawa city in Japan

Conservation status
- Least Concern (IUCN 3.1)

Scientific classification
- Kingdom: Animalia
- Phylum: Chordata
- Class: Aves
- Order: Coraciiformes
- Family: Alcedinidae
- Subfamily: Cerylinae
- Genus: Megaceryle
- Species: M. lugubris

Binomial name
- Megaceryle lugubris (Temminck, 1834)
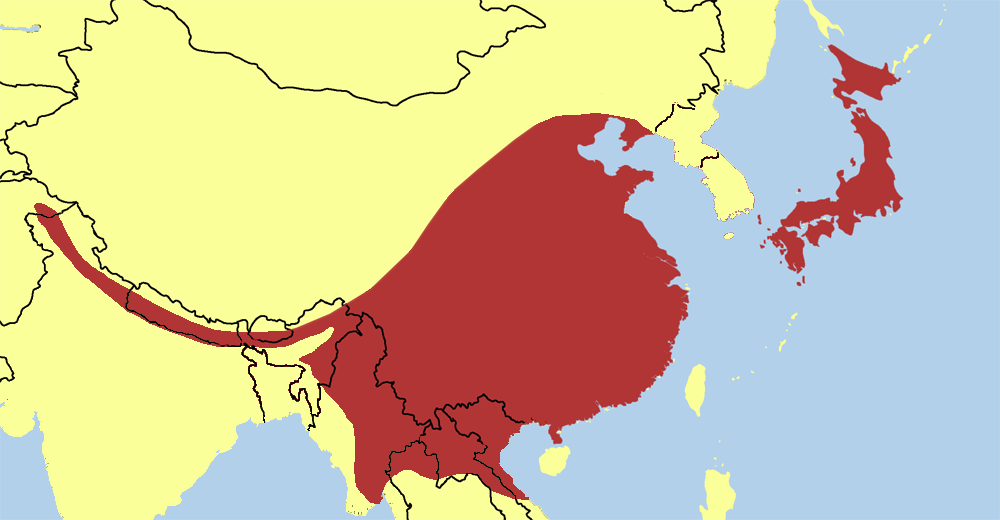
- approximate distribution

Synonyms
- Ceryle lugubris (Hartert, 1900)

= Crested kingfisher =

Species of bird

The crested kingfisher (Megaceryle lugubris) is a very large kingfisher that is native to parts of southern Asia. It is part of the kingfisher genus Megaceryle with three other species: the giant kingfisher (Megaceryle maxima), the ringed kingfisher (Megaceryle torquata), and the belted kingfisher (Megaceryle alcyon) with which it forms a species complex.

== Description ==
The crested kingfisher is a very large, stocky black and white bird, usually between 38 and 43 cm (15 and 17 in) tall, and weighs between 230 and 280 g (8 and 10 oz). It has a large, pointed black bill with a yellowish-white tip and a large, shaggy black and white barred crest. It has finely barred black and white upperparts with flanks barred grey and white, while its belly is white with a black-speckled breastband. It has a white collar that starts at the bottom of the bill and goes to the back of the neck. The tail feathers are black with 6 to 8 white bars. Males and females are the same size but exhibit sexual dimorphism in their plumage. Females have bright pink-cinnamon underwing coverts washed with pale rufous, while males lack this and instead have rufus-orange feathers on the breastband.

== Taxonomy ==
The crested kingfisher is part of the Alcedinidae family in the order Coraciformes, which also includes the bee-eaters, the rollers, the motmots, and the todies. It forms a species complex with the other kingfishers in the Megaceryle genus: the giant kingfisher, the ringed kingfisher, and the belted kingfisher. The first formal description of the crested kingfisher was by the Dutch zoologist Coenraad Jacob Temminck in 1834 under the binomial name Alcedo lugubris. The current genus Megaceryle was erected by the German naturalist Johann Jakob Kaup in 1848. Megaceryle is from the Ancient Greek megas, "great", and the existing genus Ceryle. The specific name lugubris is the Latin word for "mournful".

There are 4 recognized subspecies of crested kingfishers:

- M. l. continentalis (Hartert, 1900)
- M. l. guttulata (Stejneger, 1892)
- M. l. pallida (Momiyama, 1927)
- M. l. lugubris (Temminck, 1834)

== Phylogeny ==
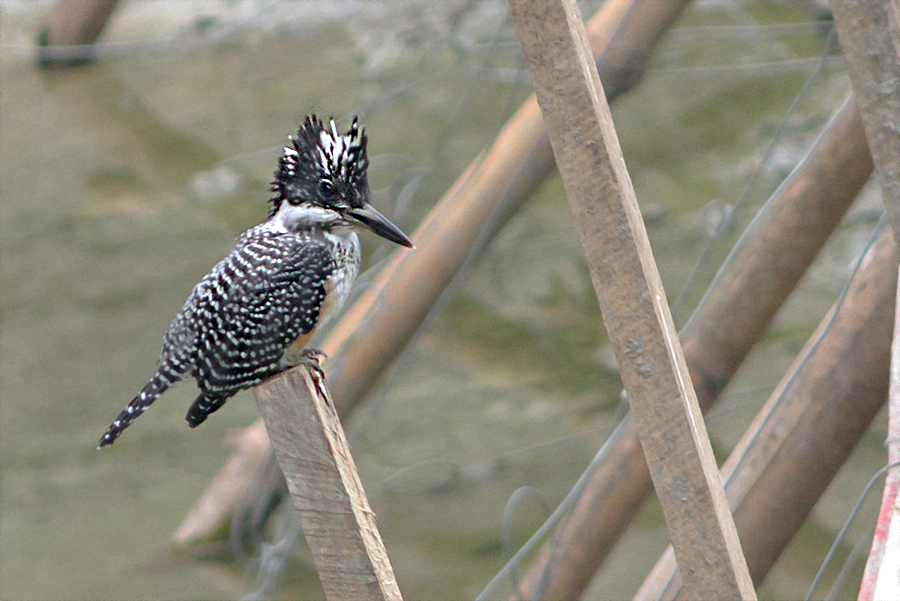
From Darap village in West Sikkim, India

Based on multiple genome analyses, Coraciiformes are most closely related to Piciformes, and Alcedinidae diverged from the two other Coraciiformes families, Coraciidae and Meropidae.

It has been suggested that the Cerylinae subfamily split from the Alcedininae as recently as the Miocene or Pliocene (Fry et al. 1992, Woodall 2001). It is thought that their ancestor invaded the New World from Asia and later split into the Megaceryle and Chloroceryle lineages. This hypothesis is often accepted; however, the timing and direction of invasions are doubtful, according to some researchers.

== Habitat and distribution ==
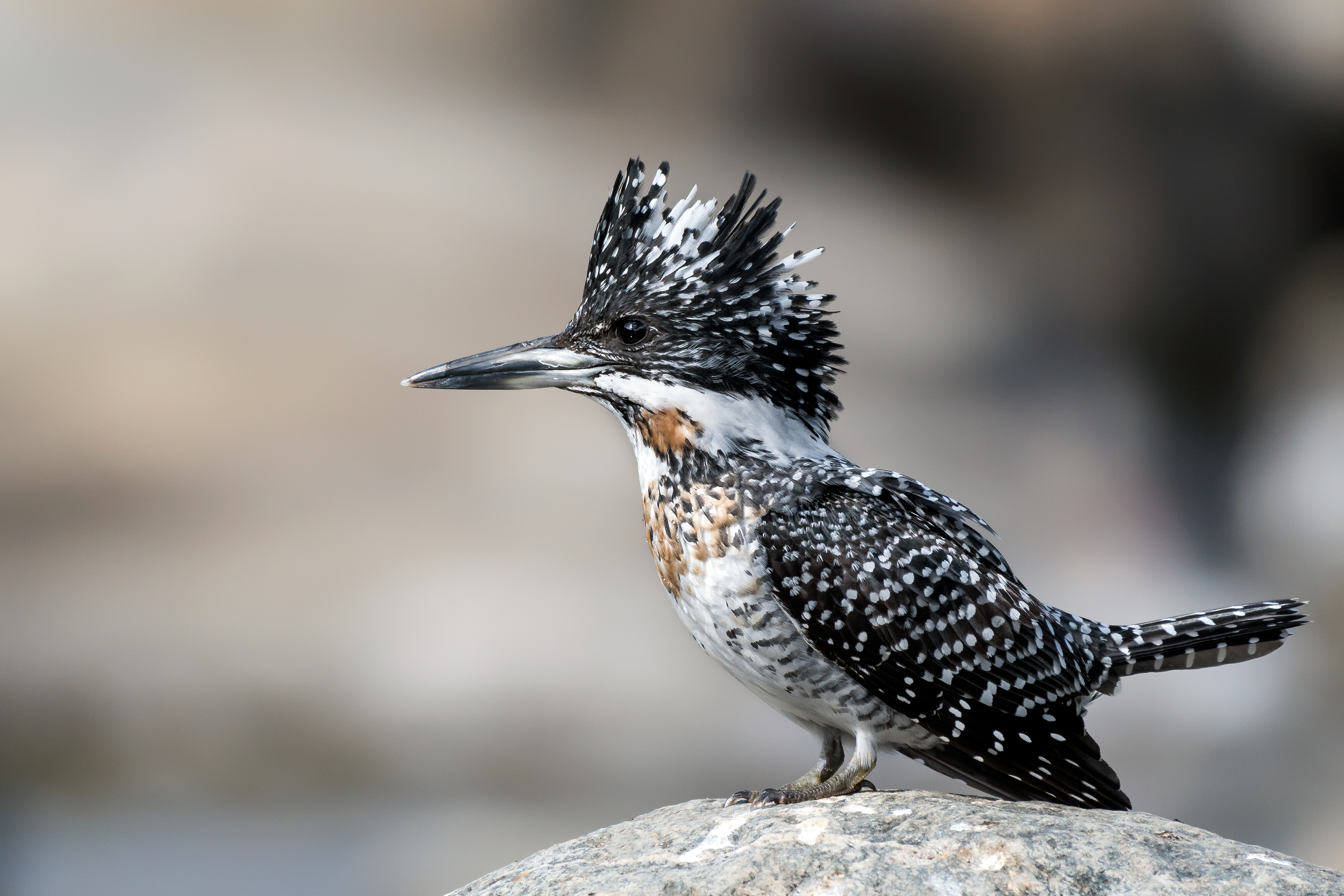
Crested Kingfisher, Himalayan Range, Uttarakhand, India

=== Distribution range ===
The crested kingfisher has the most restricted distribution of all the Cerylinae kingfishers. It can be seen from northeast Afghanistan to central Vietnam and Japan.

The four subspecies of crested kingfishers also differ in distribution range, with M. l. continentalis found in the western-central Himalayas, from Afghanistan to Bhutan; M. l. guttulata found in the eastern Himalayas to central China and northern Indochina from Bhutan to Vietnam, China and North Korea; M. l. pallida found in Hokkaido (northern Japan), and southern Kuril Islands (Russia); and finally M. l. lugubris found in central and southern Japan (Honshu, Shikoku and Kyushu).

Crested kingfishers are also known to migrate altitudinally in winter to avoid frozen rivers when living higher up in the Himalayas and in Japan. In Hokkaido, the birds remain around hot springs, while elsewhere, the kingfishers seem to be sedentary.

=== Habitat ===
Crested kingfishers live in forested areas close to rivers and near the foothills of mountains. They are also found at higher altitudes than the Common Kingfisher, where their distribution overlap. Crested Kingfisher's nest sites are usually in a forest, by streams or ravines, but can be as far as 1.5km from water, and the burrows are made in a vertical sandy bank at least 2m high.

== Behaviour ==
=== Feeding ===
Like the other Megaceryle species, the crested kingfisher is a specialist fish-eater. Unlike other kingfishers, the crested kingfisher is rarely seen diving after hovering and prefers diving from a high perch. This species of kingfisher is often seen perched on trees or other high, suitable points above a body of water, watching for fish under the surface of the water. When they spot a prey item, they dive head first into the water after their prey. This foraging behavior is also apparent in the shape of the bill, which Forshaw (1983) described as laterally compressed and pointed, which is more suited for striking at and grasping prey.

In areas where competition with other species of kingfisher arise, such as with the common kingfisher (Alcedo atthis) along the Chikuma River in Central Japan, the crested kingfisher hunts mainly in larger open channels and rarely uses small channels and temporal pools as a way of food-niche differentiation. Crested kingfishers in this area also tended to dive from higher positions than common kingfishers and caught food at significantly deeper sites than these, regardless of the foraging behavior.

=== Diet ===
The diet of the crested kingfisher consists of almost exclusively fish and larger fish than other species of kingfishers. A study on kingfishers in the Chikuma River in central Japan found that the main fish caught by crested kingfishers was Japanese Dace (Tribolodon hakonensis) and Pale Chub (Zacco platypus) and mainly selected Ayu (Plecoglossus altivelis altivelis) to bring to the nest.

=== Reproduction ===
The crested kingfisher burrows a nest into a vertical bank. Both males and females help excavate the burrow using their feet and bill. It is 10–15 cm (3.9–5.9 in) wide and 2–3 m (6 ft 7 in – 9 ft 10 in) in length and usually ends with a 30–50 cm (12–20 in). Observations on the breeding of a population in Hokkaido found that the nest hole was dug below the upper edge of the river bank of loose volcanic ash and that when encountering a hard object while digging the burrow, parents would opt to dig a new hole instead of detouring the object.

Between 4 and 7 eggs are laid between March and July, depending on the subspecies, and are incubated only by the female. The nestlings are fed by both parents for around 40 days before they fledge.

=== Vocalization ===
Crested kingfisher vocalization includes a loud "ket ket" in flight, as well as loud "ping" and deep croaks between paired birds. Loud rattling calls can also be heard coming from these birds when they are perched.

== Status ==
The 2006 IUCN report on the species classifies it as Least Concern. It was found that the population is decreasing; however, this decline is not believed to be significant enough to approach the threshold for Vulnerable under the IUCN population trend criterion. Furthermore, population range and size were too large to enter the Vulnerable classification. In Japan, the crested kingfisher is considered a threatened species in 32 of the 47 prefectures because its population size and distribution have decreased due to habitat loss. Furthermore, a 1996 report from the Wildlife Conservation Society stated that the species was regionally at risk in the province of Bolikhamsai in Laos.
