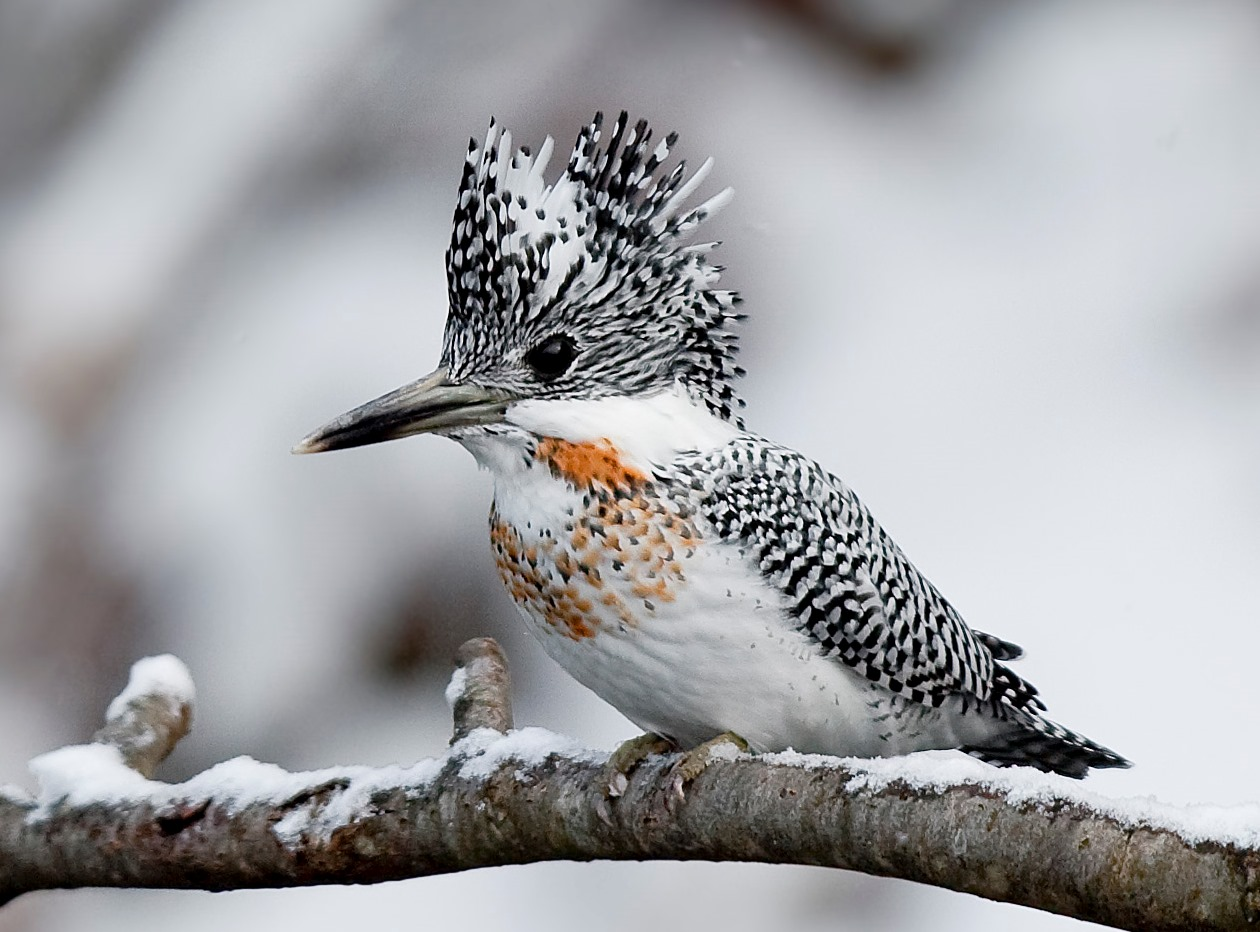
- A male crested kingfisher (Megaceryle lugubris)

Scientific classification
- Kingdom: Animalia
- Phylum: Chordata
- Class: Aves
- Order: Coraciiformes
- Family: Alcedinidae
- Subfamily: Cerylinae
- Genus: Megaceryle; Kaup, 1848

Type species
- Alcedo guttatus Vigors, 1831

Species
- M. maxima M. lugubris M. alcyon M. torquata

= Megaceryle =

Genus of birds

Phylogeny

- Megaceryle
  - - Giant kingfisher
    - Crested kingfisher
  - - Ringed kingfisher
    - Belted kingfisher

Cladogram based on Andersen et al. (2017)

Megaceryle is a genus of very large kingfishers. They have a wide distribution in the Americas, Africa, and Southeast Asia.

The genus was erected by German naturalist Johann Jakob Kaup in 1848. The type species is a subspecies of the crested kingfisher, Megaceryle lugubris guttulata. Megaceryle is from the Ancient Greek megas, "great", and the existing genus Ceryle.

== Species ==
The genus comprises four species:

Genus Megaceryle – Kaup, 1848 – four species
Common name	Scientific name and subspecies	Range	Size and ecology	IUCN status and estimated population
Crested kingfisher Male Female	Megaceryle lugubris (Temminck, 1834) Four subspecies: M. l. continentalis (Hartert, 1900); M. l. guttulata (Stejneger, 1892); M. l. pallida (Momiyama, 1927); M. l. lugubris (Temminck, 1834)	northern India, Bangladesh, northern Indochina, Southeast Asia, and Japan	Size: Habitat: Diet:	LC
Giant kingfisher Male Female	Megaceryle maxima (Pallas, 1769) Two subspecies: M. m. maxima (Pallas, 1769); M. m. gigantea (Swainson, 1837)	Liberia to northern Angola and western Tanzania, island of Bioko, Senegal, and Gambia to Ethiopia and south to South Africa	Size: Habitat: Diet:	LC
Ringed kingfisher Male Female	Megaceryle torquata (Linnaeus, 1766) Three subspecies: M. t. stictipennis (Lawrence, 1885); M. t. torquata (Linnaeus, 1766); M. t. stellata (Meyen, 1834)	Southeastern most Texas in the United States through Central America to Tierra del Fuego in South America	Size: Habitat: Diet:	LC
Belted kingfisher Male Female	Megaceryle alcyon (Linnaeus, 1758)	North America, within Canada, Alaska, and the United States	Size: Habitat: Diet:	LC

All are specialist fish-eaters with prominent stiff crests on their heads. They have dark grey or bluish-grey upperparts, largely unmarked in the two American species, but heavily spotted with white in the Asian crested kingfisher and the African giant kingfisher. The underparts may be white or rufous, and all forms have a contrasting breast band except male ringed kingfisher. The underpart pattern is always different for the two sexes of each species.

These birds nest in horizontal tunnels made in a river bank or sand bank. Both parents excavate the tunnel, incubate the eggs, and feed the young.

Megaceryle kingfishers are often seen perched prominently on trees, posts, or other suitable watch-points close to water before plunging in headfirst after their prey, usually fish, crustaceans, or frogs, but sometimes aquatic insects and other suitably sized animals.

== Origins and taxonomy ==
The previous view that the Megaceryle kingfishers arose in the New World from a specialist fish-eating alcedinid ancestor that crossed the Bering Strait and gave rise to this genus and the American green kingfishers Chloroceryle, with a large crested species later, in the Pliocene, crossing the Atlantic Ocean to give rise to the giant and crested kingfishers is probably incorrect. Rather, it now seems that the genus probably originates in the Old World, possibly Africa, and the ancestor of the belted and ringed kingfishers made the ocean crossing.

The Megaceryle kingfishers were formerly placed in Ceryle with the pied kingfisher, but the latter is genetically closer to the American green kingfishers.
