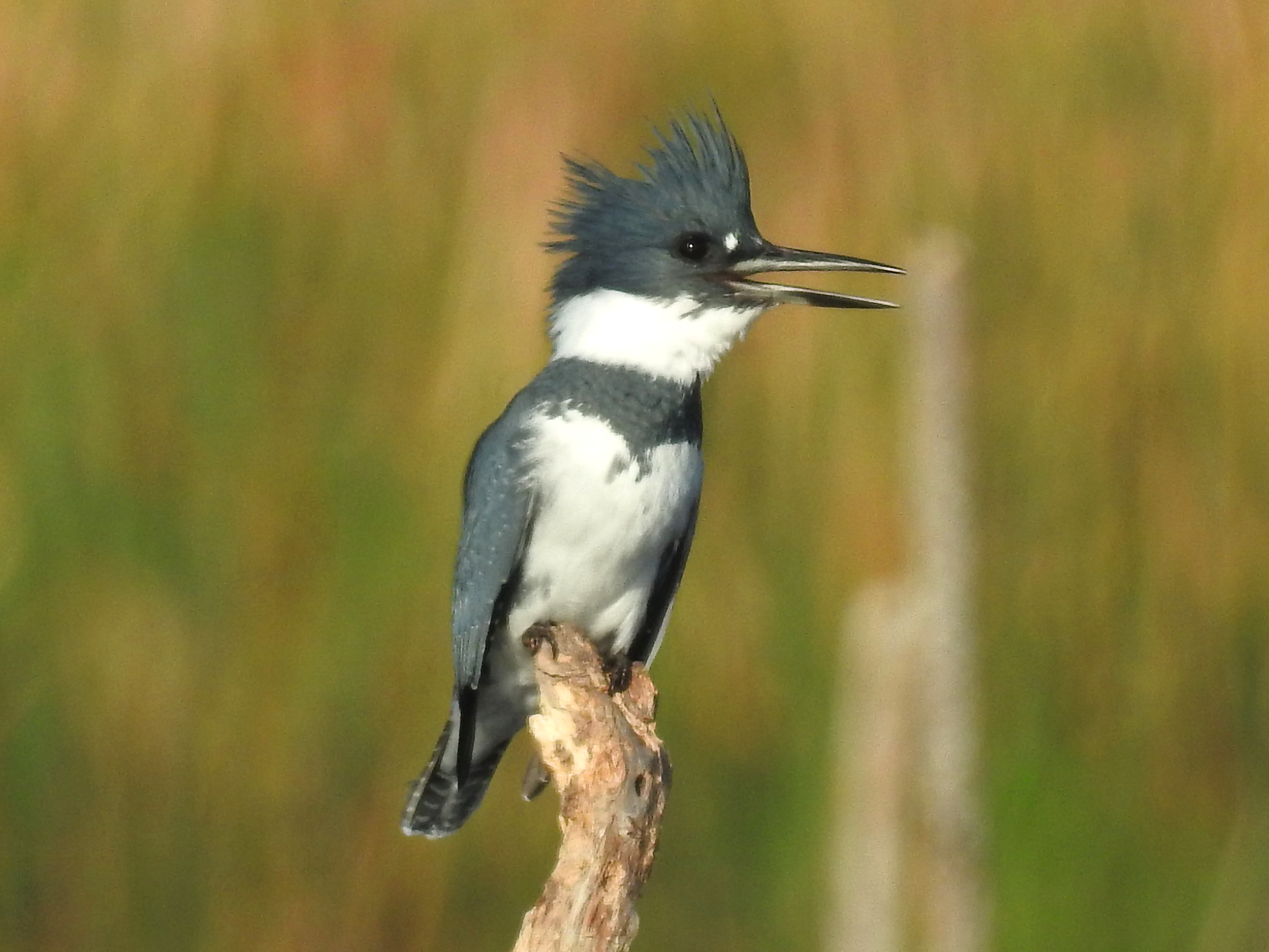
- Adult male
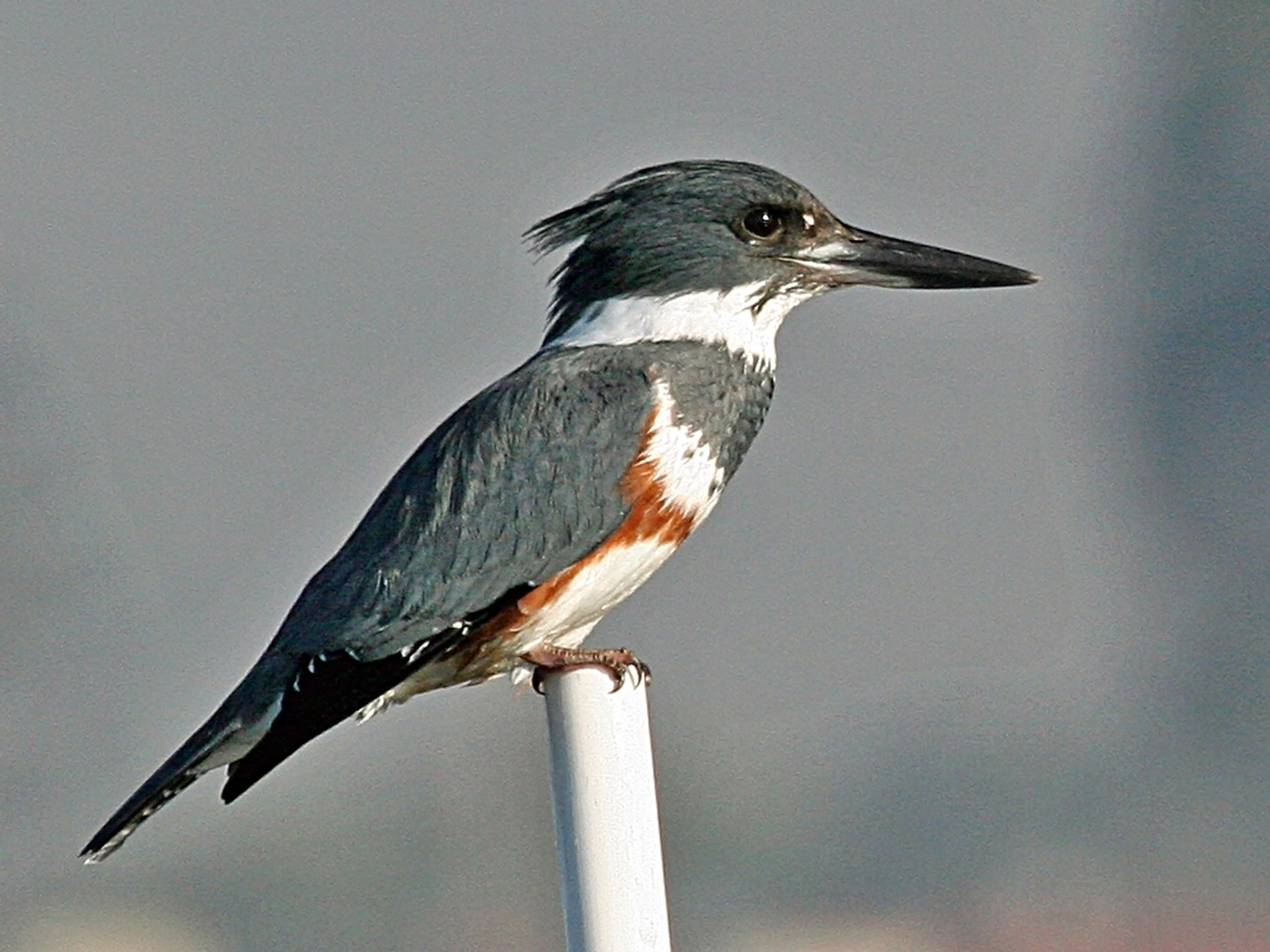
- Adult female Call

Conservation status
- Least Concern (IUCN 3.1)

Scientific classification
- Kingdom: Animalia
- Phylum: Chordata
- Class: Aves
- Order: Coraciiformes
- Family: Alcedinidae
- Subfamily: Cerylinae
- Genus: Megaceryle
- Species: M. alcyon

Binomial name
- Megaceryle alcyon (Linnaeus, 1758)
- Approximate distribution map Breeding Year-round Nonbreeding

Synonyms
- Alcedo alcyon Linnaeus, 1758; Ceryle alcyon (Linnaeus, 1758)

= Belted kingfisher =

Species of bird

The belted kingfisher (Megaceryle alcyon) is a large, conspicuous water kingfisher, native to North America.

== Taxonomy ==
The belted kingfisher received its scientific name from Swedish naturalist Carl Linnaeus in 1758 in the 10th edition of his Systema Naturae. He introduced the binomial name Alcedo alcyon, basing the name on descriptions and images published by Mark Catesby (1731), John Ray (1713), and George Edwards (1750). The current genus Megaceryle was erected by German naturalist Johann Jakob Kaup in 1848. Megaceryle is from the Ancient Greek megas, "great", and the existing genus Ceryle. The specific name alcyon is Latin for "kingfisher".

The Megaceryle large green kingfishers were formerly placed in Ceryle with the pied kingfisher, but the latter is closer to the Chloroceryle American green kingfishers. The belted kingfisher's closest living relative is the ringed kingfisher (M. torquata), and these two in all probability originated from an African Megaceryle, which colonized the Americas.

== Description ==
The belted kingfisher is a stocky, medium-sized bird that measures from 28–35 cm (11–14 in) in length with a wingspan from 48–58 cm (19–23 in). It can weigh from 113–178 g (4.0–6.3 oz). The adult female is typically slightly larger than the adult male.

This species has a large head with a shaggy crest. Its long, heavy bill is black with a grey base. These features are common in many kingfisher species. Both sexes have a slate blue head, large white collar, large blue band on the breast, and white underparts. The back and wings are slate blue with black feather tips with little white dots. The female features a rufous band across the upper belly that extends down the flanks. Juveniles of this species are similar to adults, but both sexes feature the rufous band on the upper belly. Juvenile males have a rufous band that is somewhat mottled, while the band on juvenile females is much thinner than that of an adult female.

== Distribution and habitat ==
The only kingfisher in the majority of its range, the belted kingfisher's breeding habitat is near inland bodies of waters or coasts across most of North America, within Canada and the United States including Alaska. They migrate from the northern parts of their range to the southern United States, Mexico, Central America, and the West Indies in winter, and are rare visitors to the northern areas of Colombia, Venezuela, and the Guianas. During migration, they may stray far from land; the species is recorded as an accidental visitor on several Pacific islands, such as Cocos Island, Malpelo Island, Hawaii, the Azores, Clarion Island, and has occurred as an extremely rare vagrant in Ecuador, Greenland, Ireland, the Netherlands, Portugal, and the United Kingdom, with the last having five records of the species occurring since 1908. The southernmost records of M. alcyon are from the Galapagos Archipelago, insular Ecuador, where it occurs as a migrant in small numbers but apparently not every year.

It leaves northern parts of its range when the water freezes; in warmer areas, it is a permanent resident. A few individuals may linger in the north even in the coldest winters except in the Arctic, if bodies of water remain open.

== Ecology and behaviour ==
The belted kingfisher is often seen perched prominently on trees, posts, or other suitable watchpoints close to water before plunging in headfirst after its fish prey. It also eats amphibians, molluscs, small crustaceans, insects, small mammals, small birds, reptiles, and berries. The belted kingfisher has been observed to pound its prey against its perch or the ground to stun and kill it before consumption.

Belted kingfishers can fly up to 45 miles per hour (72km/h) and can dive into the water at 25 miles per hour (40km/h) while catching its prey

As the kingfisher flies about its habitat, it frequently emits a characteristic rattling call. Accordingly, a small group of belted kingfishers is known as a rattle, concentration, or kerfuffle.

This bird nests in a horizontal tunnel made in a river bank or sand bank and excavated by both parents. Its burrow-like nests range in depth from 3-6 feet, or 0.9 to 1.8 m. The female lays five to eight eggs, and both adults share the task of incubating the eggs and feeding the young. During the breeding season, males may also exhibit a strong degree of territoriality in the immediate vicinity of their nest, chasing away conspecifics and predators alike.

The nest of the belted kingfisher is a long tunnel and often slopes uphill. One possible reason for the uphill slope is that in case of flooding, the chicks can survive in the air pocket formed by the elevated end of the tunnel.

== In popular culture ==
There is a campaign to make the belted kingfisher the official mascot of the University of Illinois Urbana-Champaign. Students and alumni in support of the proposed mascot have noted that female belted kingfishers are orange and blue, which corresponds to the University’s colors. Multiple Indigenous organizations and the Audubon have endorsed the proposed mascot which seeks to fill the absence of the removed Chief Illiniwek mascot. A kingfisher costumed mascot has been created and has made appearances at campus events, although the mascot is not yet official. If approved, it would be the first University in the US to have a Kingfisher mascot.

== Gallery ==
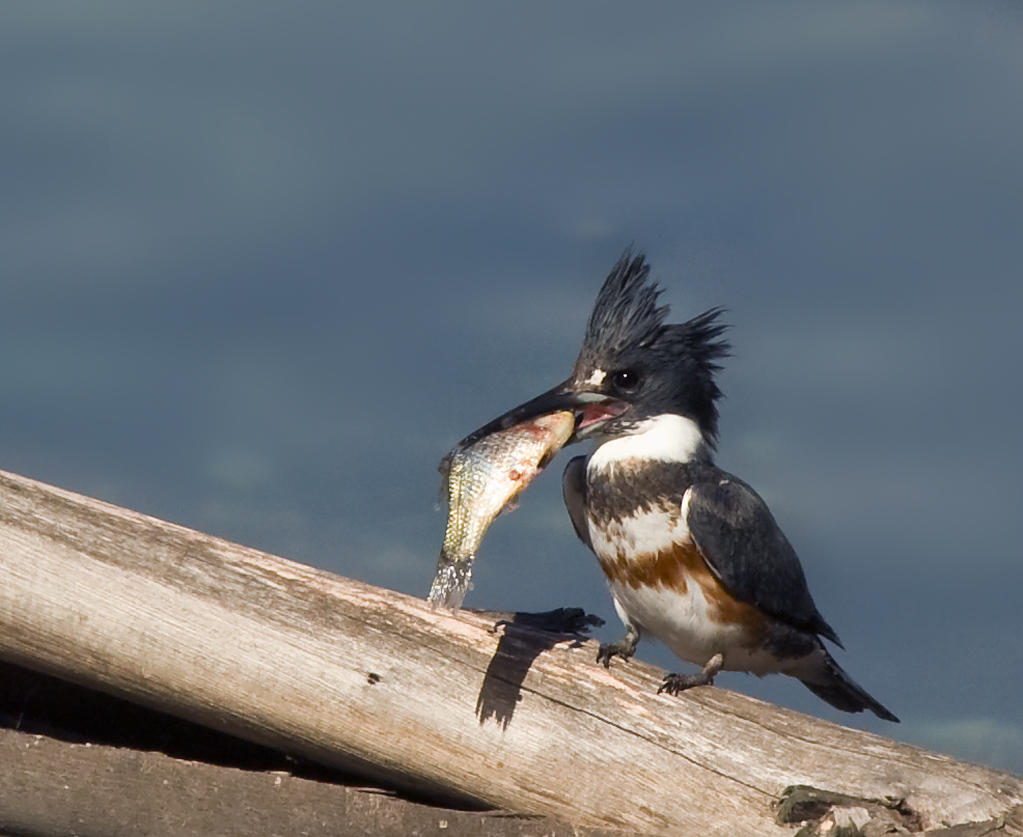
Female with prey

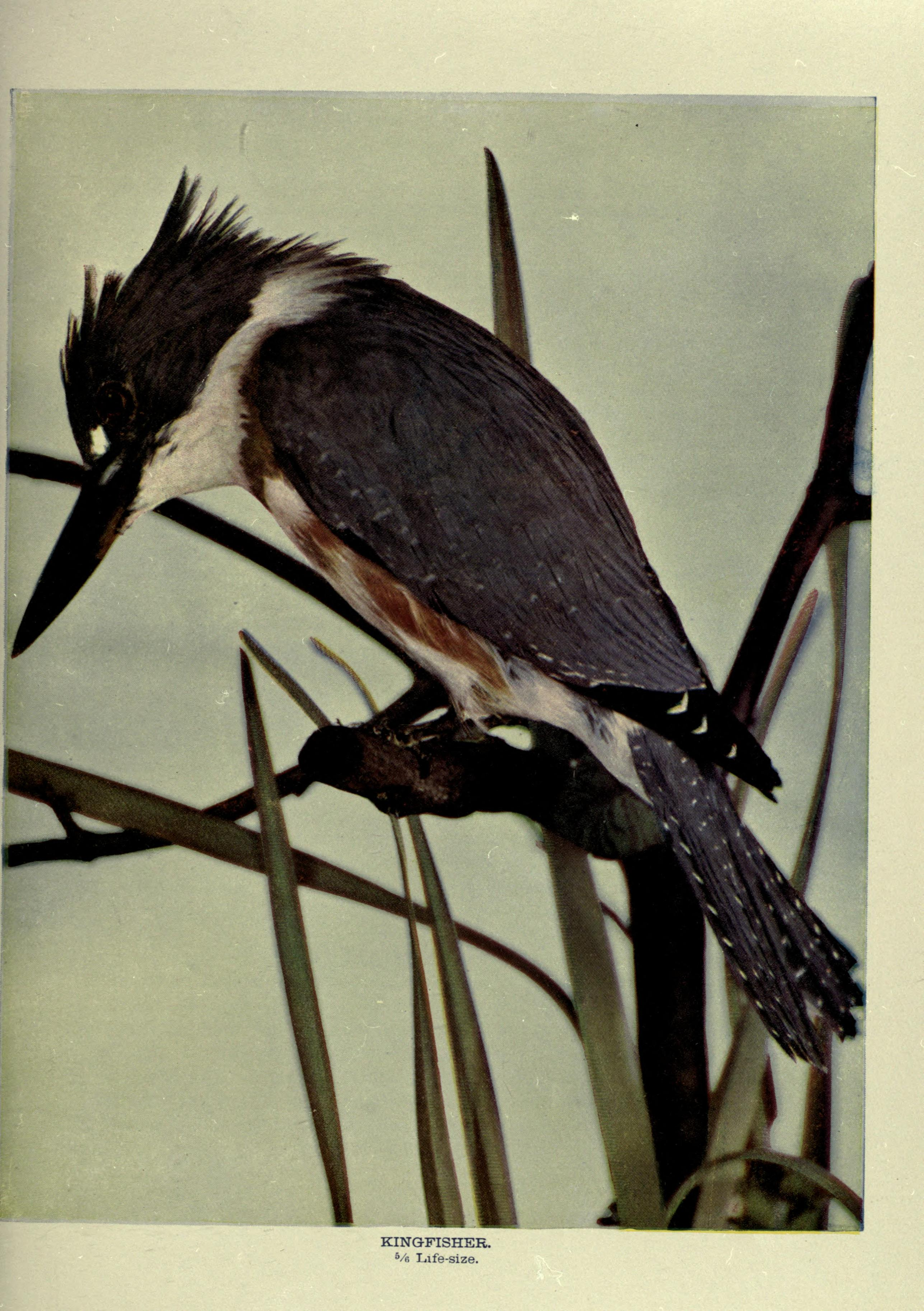
Chromolithograph from Bird Neighbors (Neltje Blanchan, 1897)

Depiction by John James Audubon from The Birds of America
