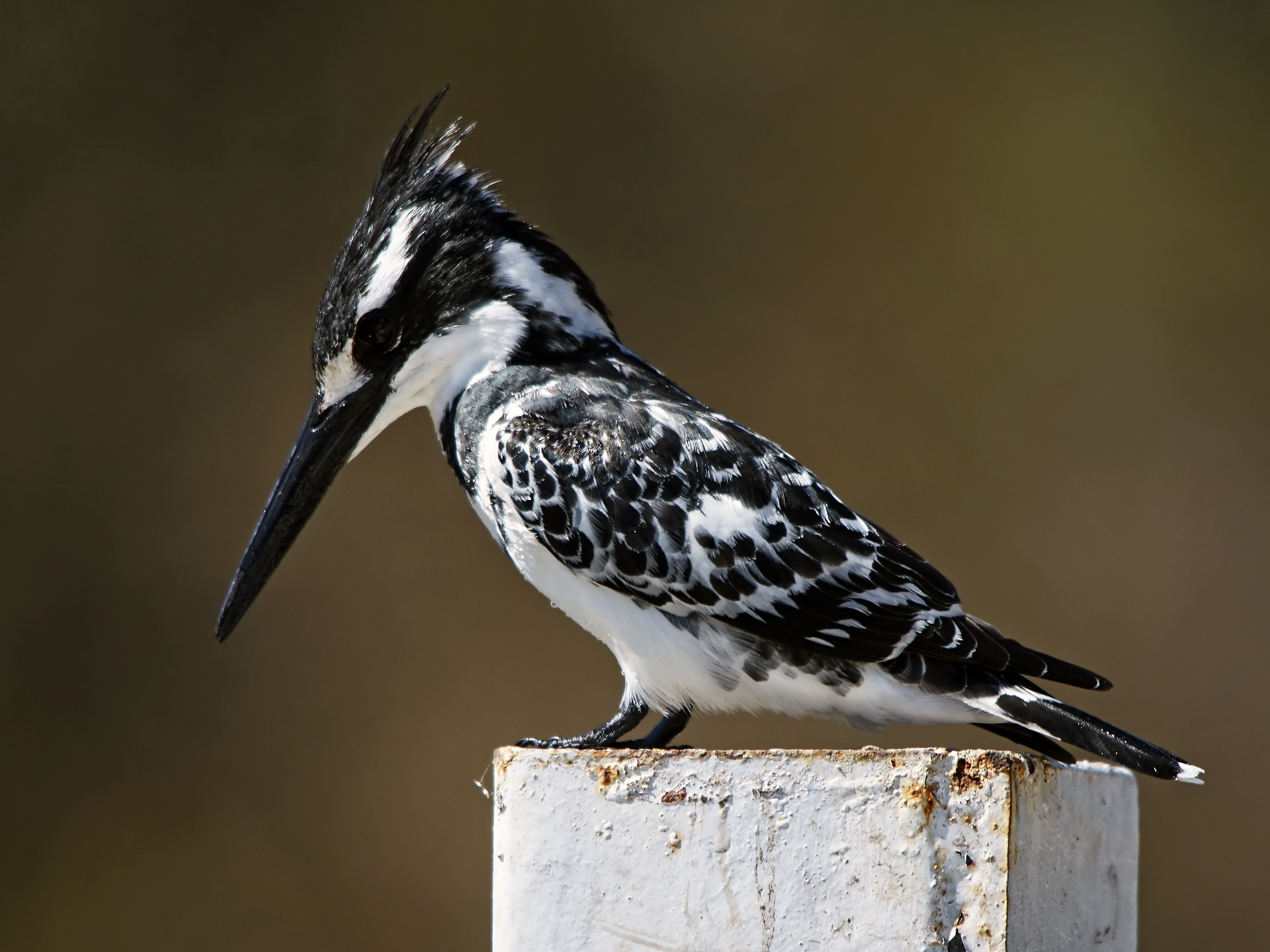
- Pied kingfisher (Ceryle rudis).

Scientific classification
- Kingdom: Animalia
- Phylum: Chordata
- Class: Aves
- Order: Coraciiformes
- Family: Alcedinidae
- Subfamily: Cerylinae; Reichenbach, 1851

Genera
- Megaceryle; Ceryle; Chloroceryle

= Water kingfisher =

Subfamily of birds

Phylogeny of the Cerylinae

- Cerylinae
  - Megaceryle
  - - Ceryle
    - Chloroceryle

Cladogram based on Andersen et al. (2017)

The water kingfishers or Cerylinae are one of the three subfamilies of kingfishers, and are also known as the cerylid kingfishers. All six American species are in this subfamily.

These are all specialist fish-eating species, unlike many representatives of the other two subfamilies, and it is likely that they are all descended from fish-eating kingfishers which founded populations in the New World. It was believed that the entire group evolved in the Americas, but this seems not to be true. The original ancestor possibly evolved in Africa – at any rate in the Old World – and the Chloroceryle species are the youngest ones.

== Phylogeny ==
Evidence from molecular phylogenetic studies suggests that the Cerylinae originated in Asia and have colonised the New World on two occasions: the first time was around 8 million years ago by the Chloroceryle and the second time was around 1.9 million years ago by the common ancestor of the ringed kingfisher and the belted kingfisher in the genus Megaceryle.

The subfamily Cerylinae contains nine kingfisher species and is divided into three genera:

Image	Genus	Living species	Distribution
	Megaceryle Kaup, 1848	Giant kingfisher (Megaceryle maxima); Crested kingfisher (Megaceryle lugubris); Belted kingfisher (Megaceryle alcyon); Ringed kingfisher (Megaceryle torquata)	large crested kingfishers with a wide distribution in Africa, Asia and America. The belted kingfisher, (M. alcyon), is the only kingfisher that is widespread in North America, though the ringed kingfisher (M. torquata) may be found as far north as Texas and Arizona
	Ceryle F. Boie, 1828	Pied kingfisher (Ceryle rudis)	the single species is widespread in the warm regions of the Old World northwards to Turkey and China.
	Chloroceryle Kaup, 1848	Amazon kingfisher (Chloroceryle amazona); Green kingfisher (Chloroceryle americana); Green-and-rufous kingfisher (Chloroceryle inda); American pygmy kingfisher (Chloroceryle aenea)	the four American green kingfishers of tropical America
