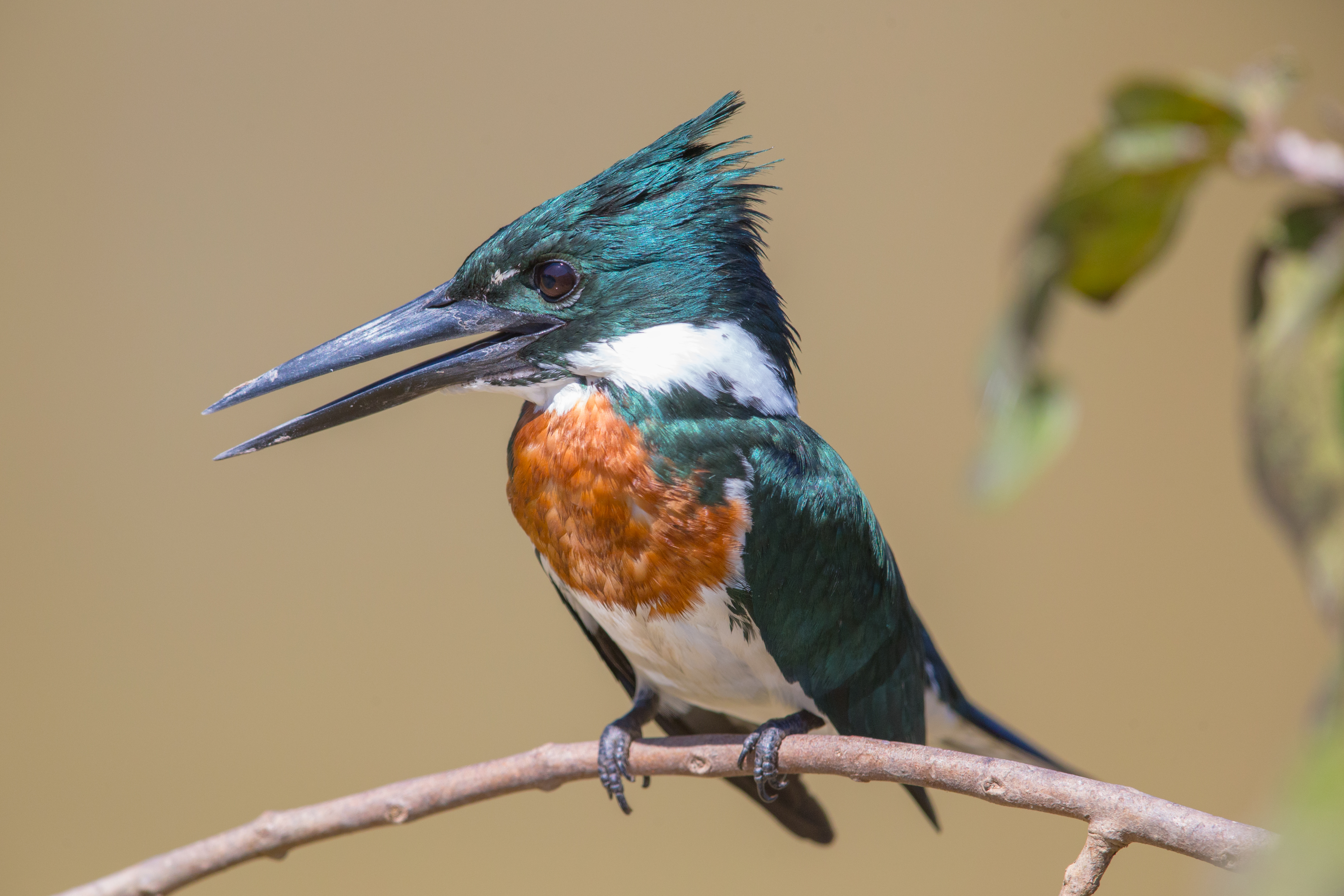
- A male in Corrientes Province, Argentina
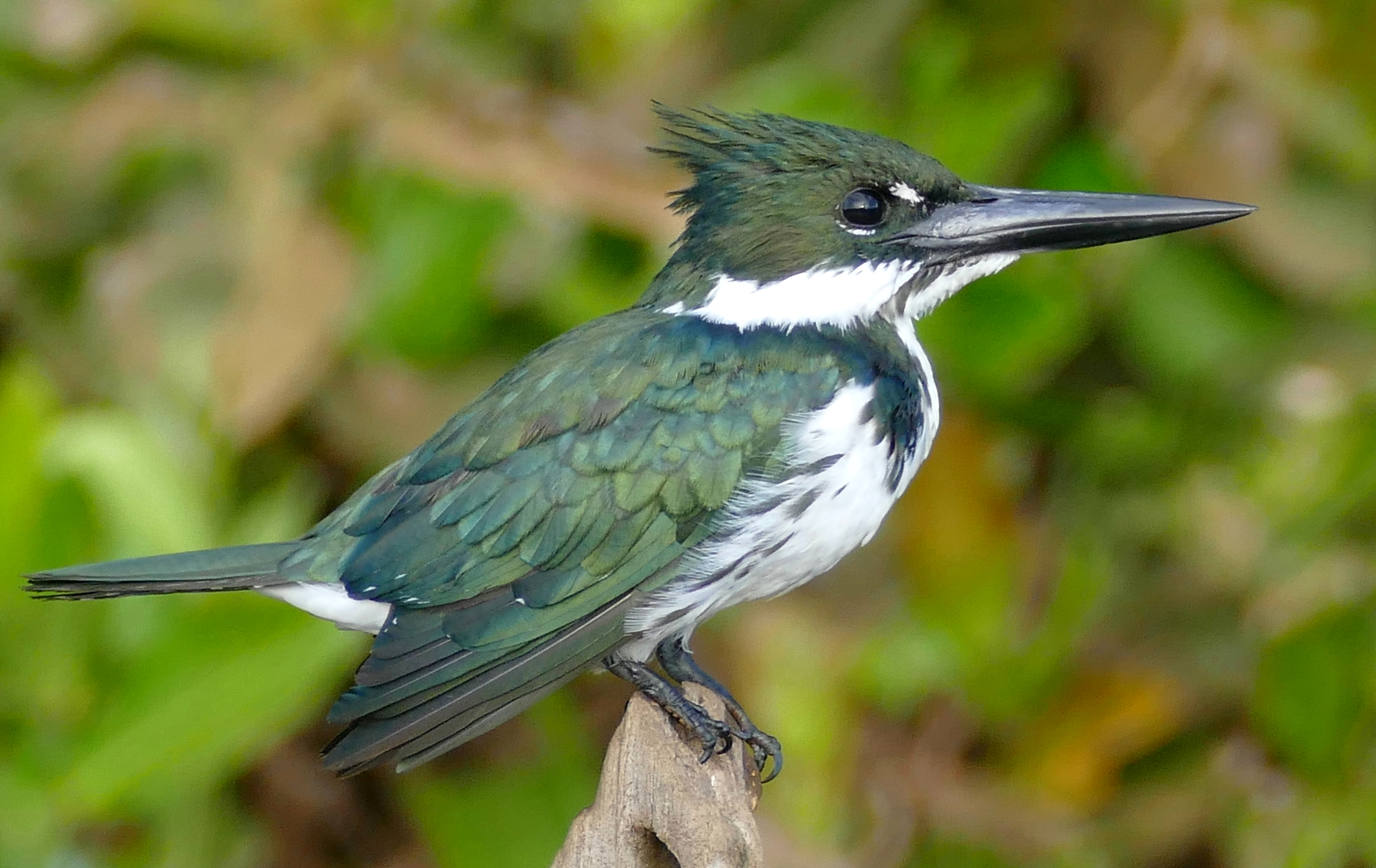
- A female in Mato Grosso, Brazil

Conservation status
- Least Concern (IUCN 3.1)

Scientific classification
- Kingdom: Animalia
- Phylum: Chordata
- Class: Aves
- Order: Coraciiformes
- Family: Alcedinidae
- Subfamily: Cerylinae
- Genus: Chloroceryle
- Species: C. amazona

Binomial name
- Chloroceryle amazona (Latham, 1790)
- resident range

= Amazon kingfisher =

Species of bird

The Amazon kingfisher (Chloroceryle amazona) is a species of "water kingfisher" in subfamily Cerylinae of family Alcedinidae. It is found in the lowlands of the American tropics from southern Mexico south through Central America to northern Argentina.

== Taxonomy and systematics ==
The first formal description of the Amazon kingfisher was by the English ornithologist John Latham in 1790 under the binomial name Alcedo amazona. The current genus Chloroceryle was erected by Johann Jakob Kaup in 1848. The species is monotypic.

== Description ==
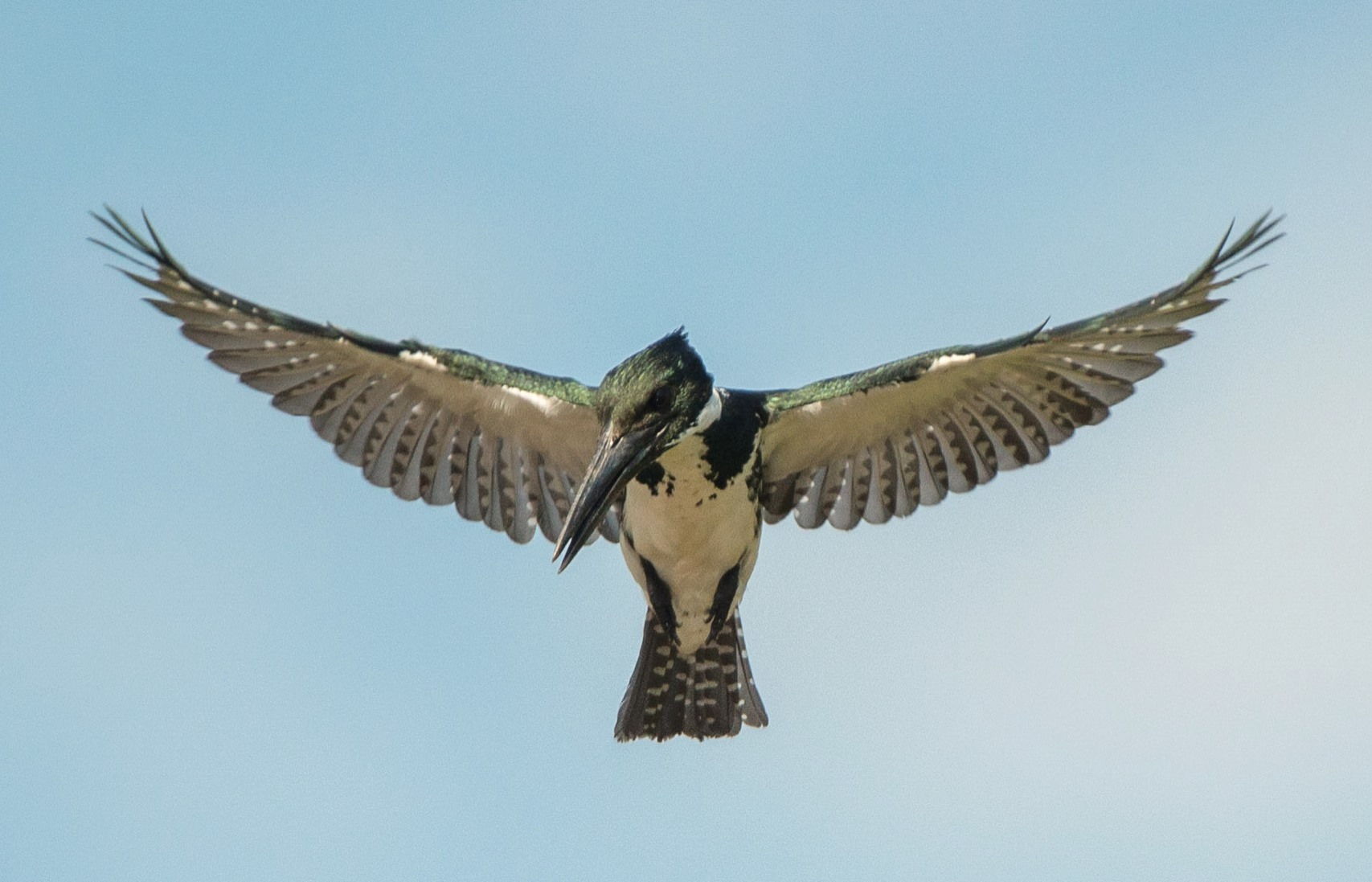
A female hovering over the Tárcoles River in Costa Rica

The Amazon kingfisher is about 30 cm (12 in) long. Males weigh 98 to 121 g (3.5 to 4.3 oz) and females 125 to 140 g (4.4 to 4.9 oz). It has the typical kingfisher shape, with a shaggy crest and long heavy bill. The bill is black with some pale yellow at the base of the mandible and its legs and feet are dark grey. Adult males have dark bronzy green upperparts divided by a white collar. They have a white chin and throat, a rich rufous breast with dark green sides, and a white belly with dark green streaks on the side. Adult females lack the rufous breast but the green of the sides extends across the breast almost to its middle. Juvenile males have a buffy rufous breast and both sexes have buff spots on the upperwing coverts and a large yellow patch on their bill.

== Distribution and habitat ==
The Amazon kingfisher is found from the Mexican states of Sinaloa and Tamaulipas south through Central America into Colombia and Venezuela and separately east of the Andes in every South American country except Chile, reaching as far south as central Argentina. It has been recorded as a vagrant to Aruba, Curaçao, Trinidad, and Texas. It inhabits large rivers, both slow- and fast-flowing, and the wooded shores of lakes and freshwater lagoons. It also occasionally occurs in brackish lagoons, mangroves, and tidal estuaries. It favors open landscapes rather than dense forest. In elevation it is mostly found below 1,200 m (3,900 ft) but occurs as high as 2,500 m (8,200 ft) in Venezuela.

== Behavior ==
=== Movement ===
The Amazon kingfisher is generally believed to be sedentary but there are records of vagrancy.

=== Feeding ===
The Amazon kingfisher usually hunts from a perch from which it dives into water for its prey. Occasionally it hovers before diving. Its diet is mostly fish, especially those of family Characidae, and crustaceans.

=== Breeding ===
The Amazon kingfisher's breeding season varies geographically. It is generally in the first half of the year in Central America but has not been detailed elsewhere. Both members of a pair excavate a slightly inclined burrow in a river bank or similar feature; it is typically up to 1.6 m (5.2 ft) long and has a nest chamber at the end. The clutch size is three or four eggs. Most incubation at night is by the female and during the day by the male. The incubation period is about 22 days and fledging occurs 29 to 30 days after hatch.

=== Vocalization ===
The Amazon kingfisher makes a "[l]oud, harsh, repeated 'tek' or 'klek'" and a "staccato 'chrit'" that may be extended into a rattle. It also makes "frog-like" calls. Another vocalization is "an accelerating series of clear notes...'see see see...su su su su'" that is thought to be a greeting or alarm call.

== Status ==
The IUCN has assessed the Amazon kingfisher as being of Least Concern. It has an extremely large range. Its estimated population of at least a half million mature individuals is, however, believed to be decreasing. No immediate threats have been identified.

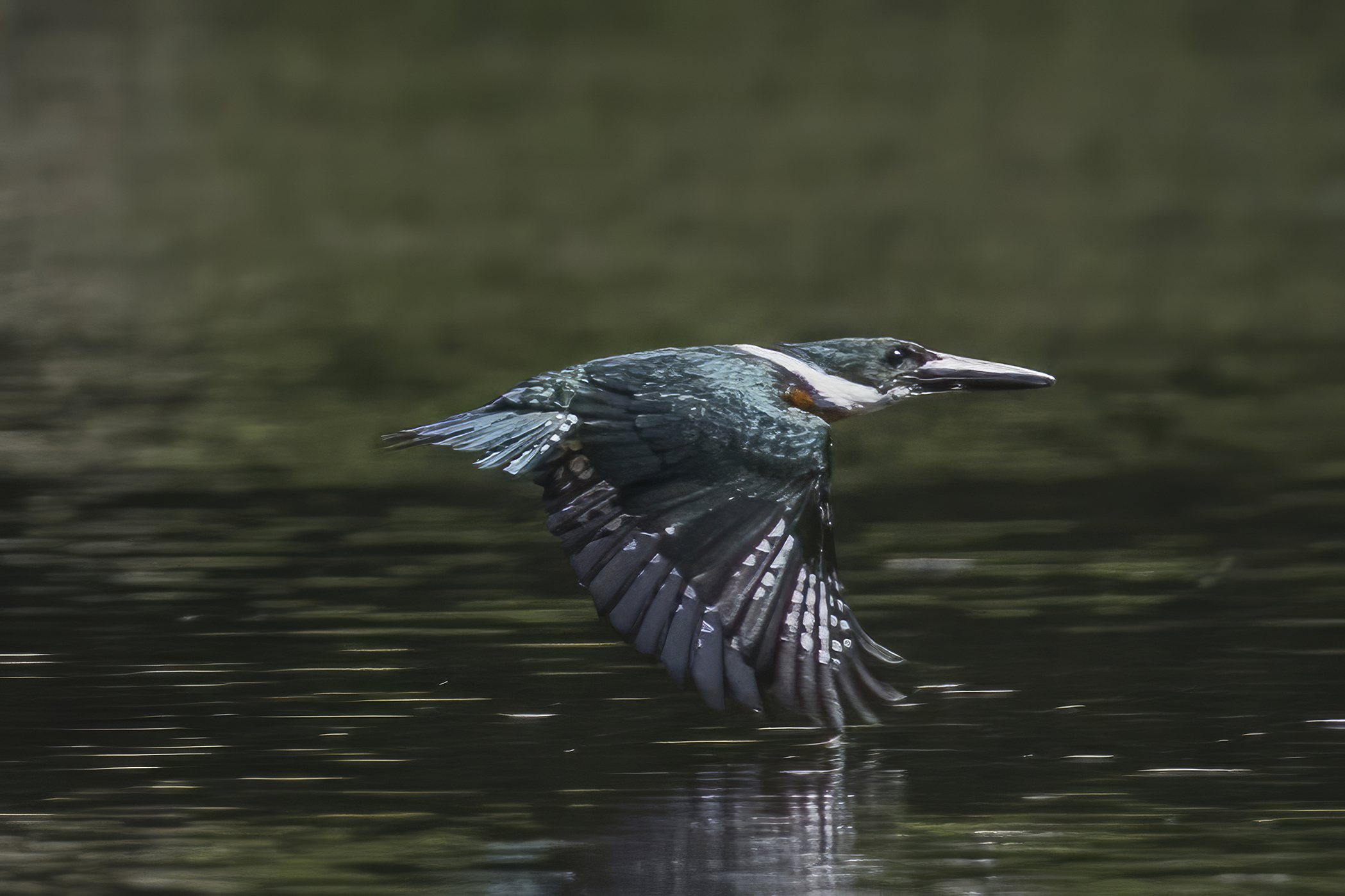
male

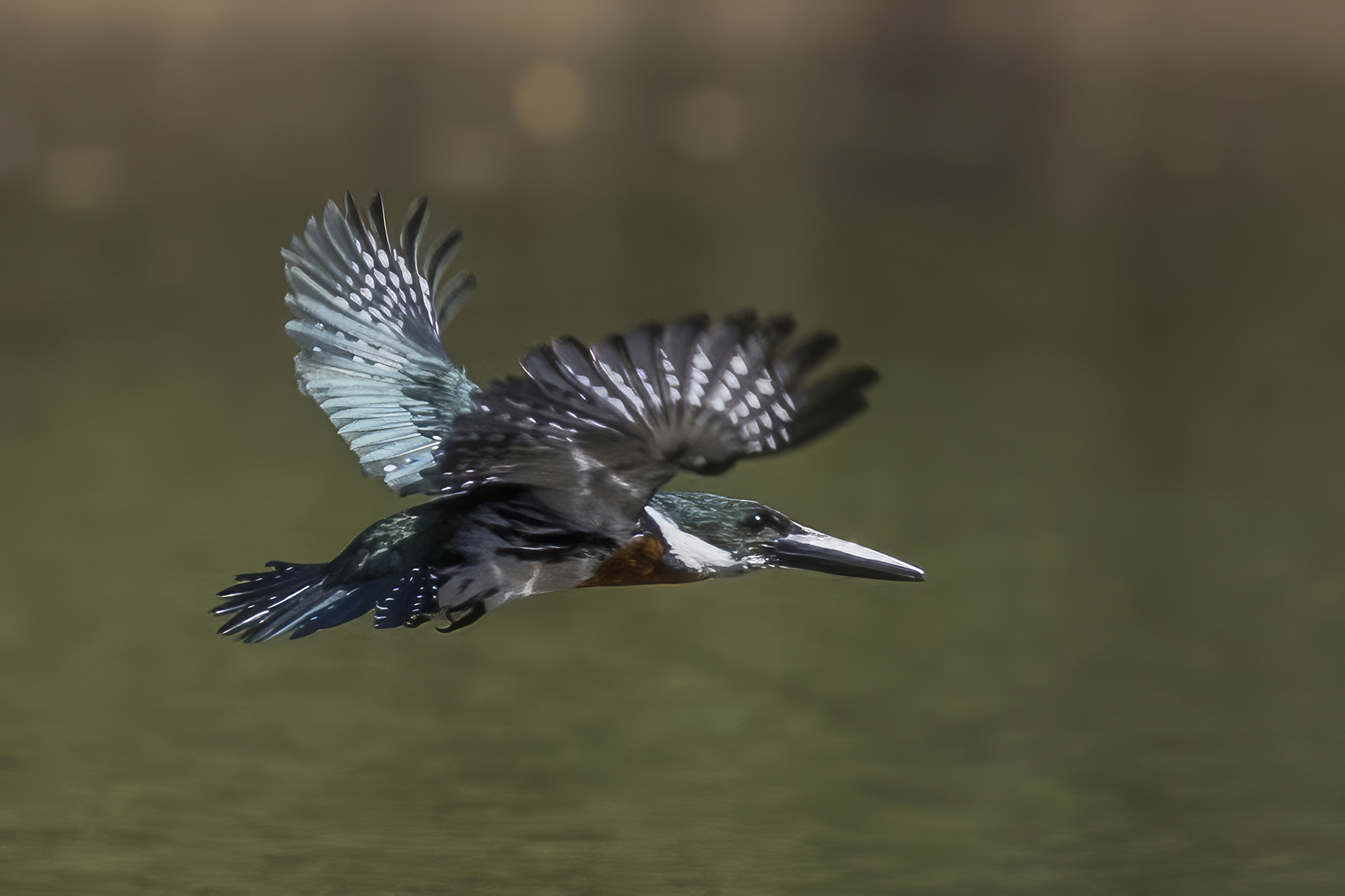
male

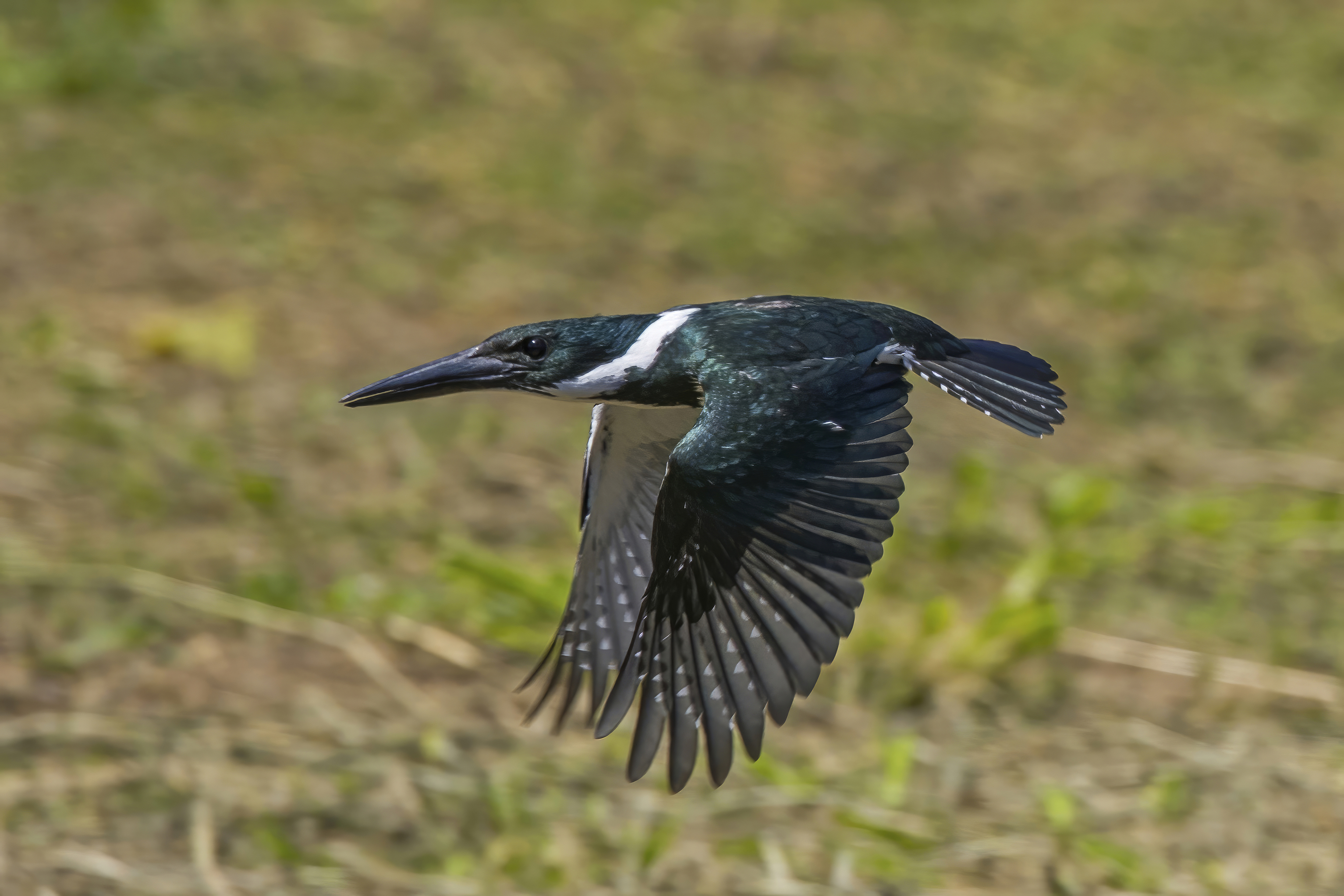
female

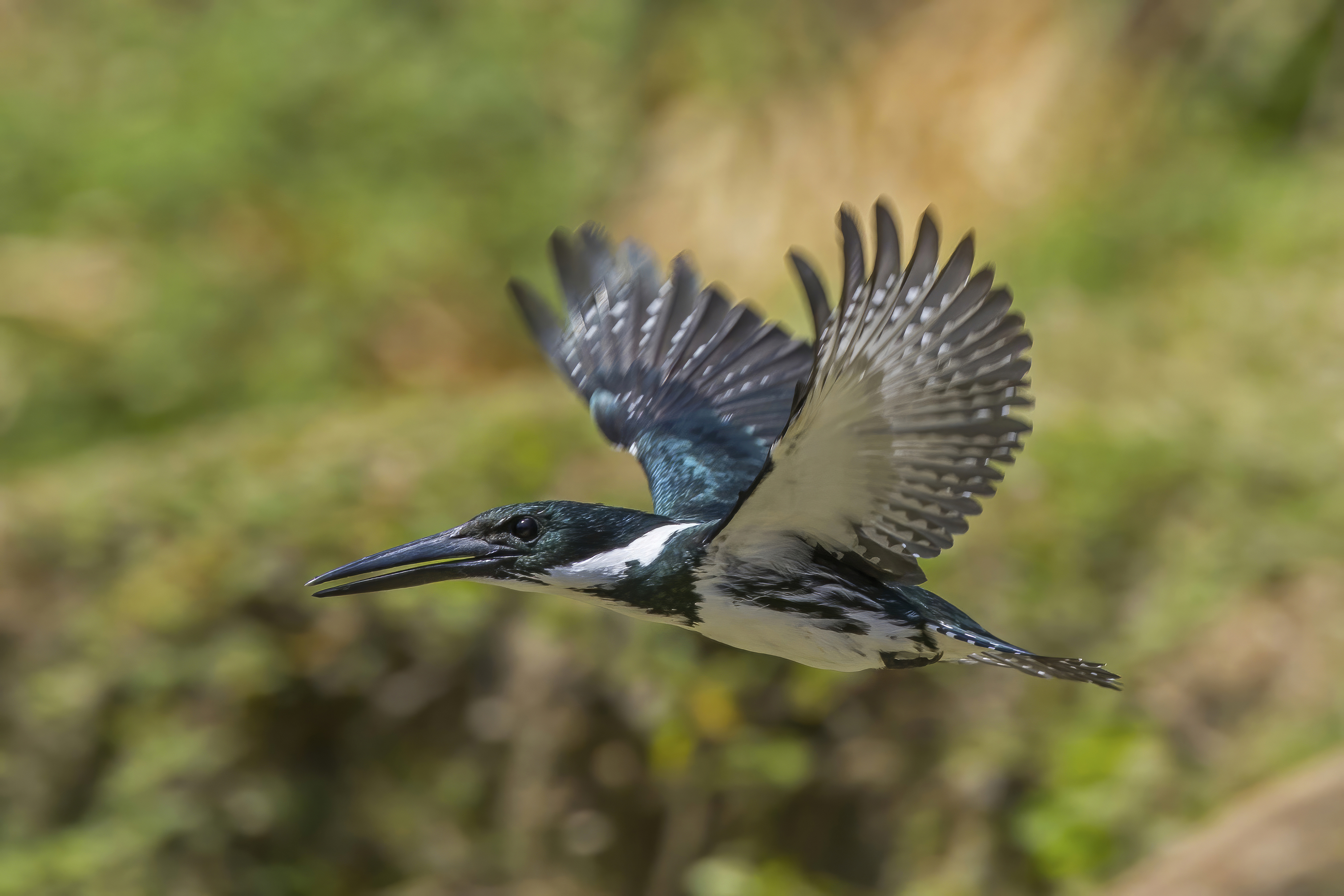
female
