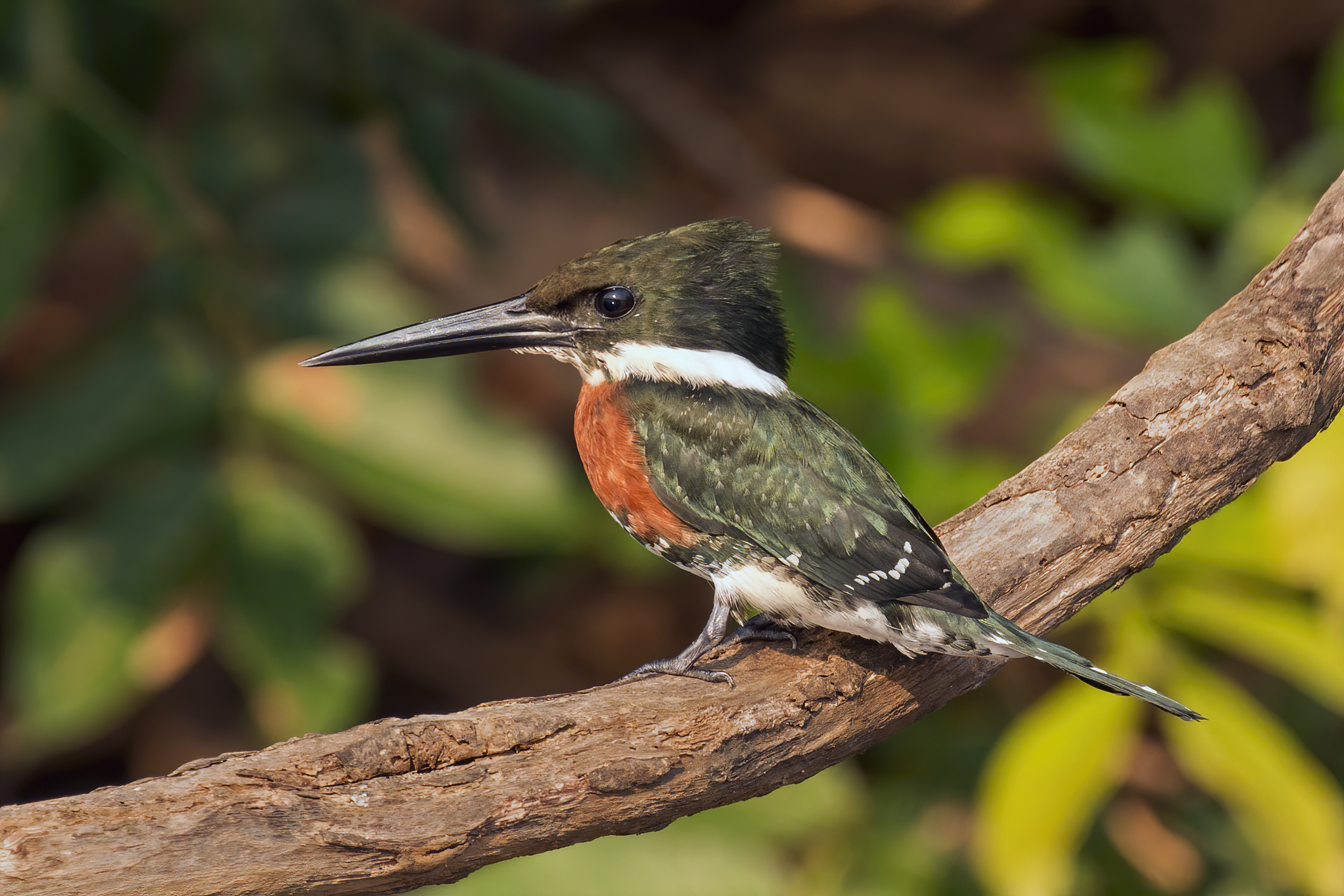
- Male C. a. americana the Pantanal, Brazil

Conservation status
- Least Concern (IUCN 3.1)

Scientific classification
- Kingdom: Animalia
- Phylum: Chordata
- Class: Aves
- Order: Coraciiformes
- Family: Alcedinidae
- Subfamily: Cerylinae
- Genus: Chloroceryle
- Species: C. americana

Binomial name
- Chloroceryle americana (Gmelin, JF, 1788)

Subspecies
- C. a. americana C. a. mathewsii C. a. hachisukai C. a. septentrionalis C. a. cabanisii

= Green kingfisher =

Species of bird

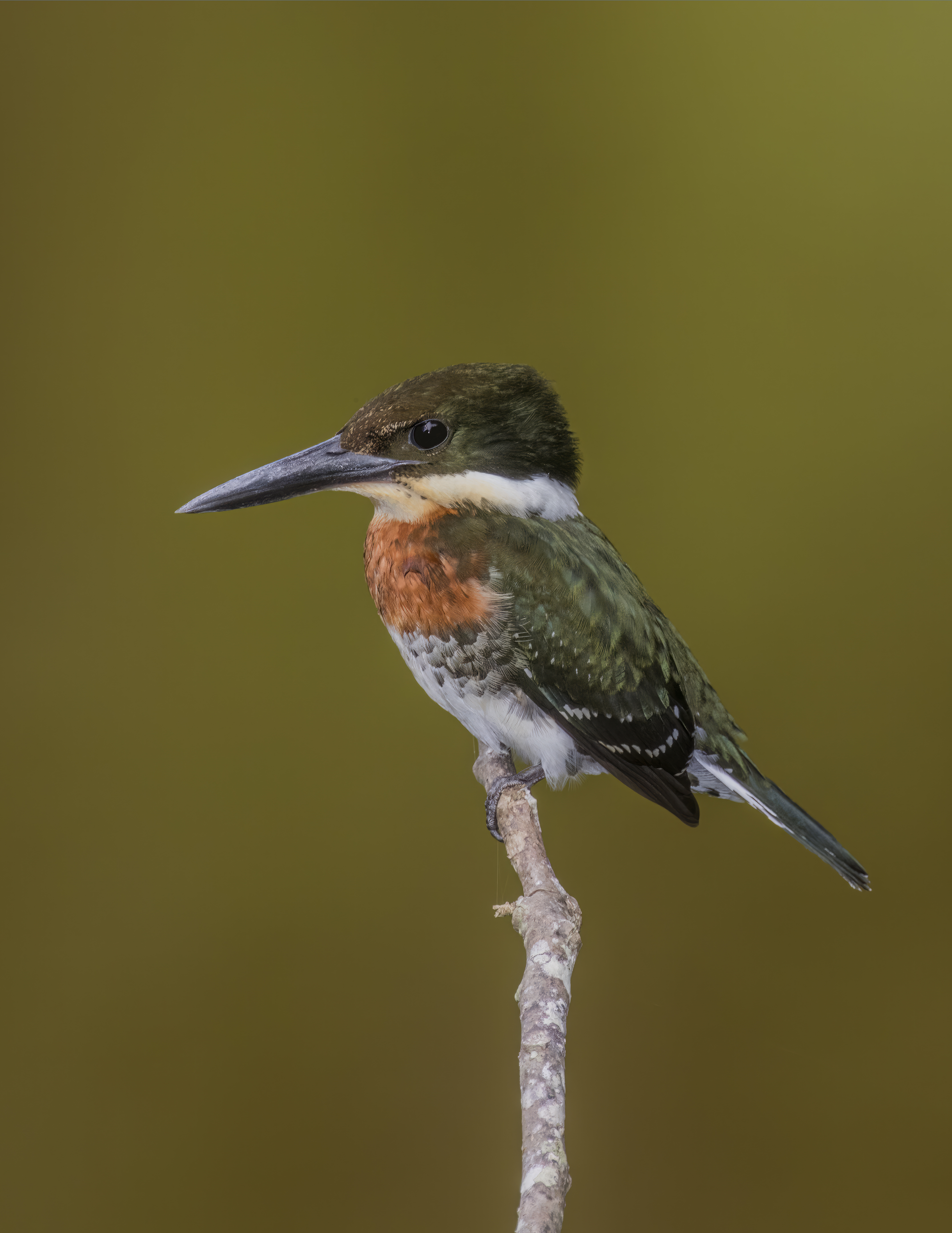
Male C. a. septentrionalis, Panama

The green kingfisher (Chloroceryle americana) is a species of "water kingfisher" in the subfamily Cerylinae of the family Alcedinidae. It is found from southern Texas in the United States south through Central America, and in every mainland South American country except Chile.

== Taxonomy and systematics ==
The green kingfisher was formally described in 1788 by the German naturalist Johann Friedrich Gmelin in his revised and expanded edition of Carl Linnaeus's Systema Naturae. He placed it with the other kingfishers in the genus Alcedo and coined the binomial name Alcedo americana. Gmelin based his description on "Le martin-pêcheur vert et blanc" from Cayenne that had been described and illustrated in 1780 by the French polymath Comte de Buffon and also the "white and green kingfisher" that had been described in 1782 by the English ornithologist John Latham. The green kingfisher is now placed in the genus Chloroceryle that was introduced in 1848 by Johann Jakob Kaup.

A molecular phylogenetic study published in 2006 found that the green kingfisher is a sister species to the larger green-and-rufous kingfisher (C. inda).

Five subspecies are recognized:

Image	Subspecies	Distribution
	C. a. hachisukai (Laubmann, 1941)	from extreme southern Arizona, southwestern New Mexico, and west central Texas in the US into northwestern Mexico to Nayarit
	C. a. septentrionalis (Sharpe, 1892)	from south central Texas and eastern Mexico south to northern Colombia and western Venezuela
	C. a. americana (Gmelin, JF, 1788)	South America east of the Andes from Venezuela east through the Guianas into northern and central Brazil and south to northeastern Bolivia; also Trinidad and Tobago
	C. a. mathewsii Laubmann, 1927	from southern Brazil and southern Bolivia through Paraguay and Uruguay to central Argentina
	C. a. cabanisii (Tschudi, 1846)	west of the Andes from Colombia through Ecuador to southernmost Peru; as a vagrant to Chile

Some populations of C. a. septentrionalis have in the past been separated as subspecies C. a. vanrossemi and C. a. isthmica. The population of Trinidad and Tobago, usually included with C. a. americana, has in the past been treated as subspecies C. a. croteta. Other populations of C. a. americana have been suggested to be split as C. a. hellmayri and C. a. bottomeana. None of these subspecies are currently (2022) recognized by major worldwide taxonomic systems.

== Description ==
The green kingfisher is about 20 cm (8 in) long and weighs about 35 to 40 g (1.2 to 1.4 oz); females are larger and heavier than males. Birds in the northern and southern parts of its range, and those west of the Andes, are larger and heavier than the others, but the differences tend to be clinal. The species has the typical kingfisher shape with long heavy bill (heaviest in Trinidad and Tobago); in contrast to many other kingfishers, however, it does not have an obvious crest. The bill is black with some horn color at the base of the mandible and its legs and feet are dark gray. Both sexes have green upperparts with two or more rows of white spots on the flight feathers. Their underparts are mostly white with green spots on the sides and flanks. Their tail is green with much white on the outer feathers that shows best in flight. Adult males have a white collar and a rufous breast. Adult females have a white collar, a buffy throat and breast, and a band of green speckles across the breast and upper belly. Juveniles resemble females but are duller and have small buff spots on their crown and wing coverts.

One vocalization "resembles the striking of two pebbles together, usually single or double". Another is "a harsh, buzzy scold, described variously as tsheersh, tseelp or zchrrk". Authors differ on their interpretations of whether the vocalizations are calls or songs and if they are calls, what their purpose is.

The subspecies differ somewhat in the shade of the upperparts' green, the amount of white on the wings and tail, the amount and size of the flank markings, and the extent of the breast bands (complete or not). However, there is much individual variation within each subspecies and the differences are to some extent clinal, so the differences among the subspecies tend to be obscured.

== Distribution and habitat ==
The green kingfisher inhabits wooded shorelines of streams and freshwater ponds and lakes. It favors still or slow-moving water, and though it requires low vegetation for hunting perches it generally prefers relatively open habitat rather than dense forest. It is a year-round resident throughout its range but roams a territory that may be as much as 1 km (0.6 mi) or more of river.

== Behavior ==
=== Feeding ===
The Amazon kingfisher usually hunts from a perch from which it dives into water for its prey. The perch is typically about 1 to 1.5 m (3 to 5 ft) high; it may be directly over water or within a few meters of its edge. In a study in Amazonia about half of the perches were bare snags and the rest were a mix of leafless and leafy trees and bushes. It usually shifts perches after each foray. Occasionally it hovers before diving, sometimes from as high as 6 m (20 ft). Pairs often defend feeding territories from other green kingfishers but seldom from other kingfisher species.

The prey is mostly small fish but includes crustaceans such as shrimp and also adult and nymph aquatic and terrestrial insects. The size of the fish taken varies, apparently with availability and the presence of other species of kingfishers. Studies have published sizes as 8 to 80 mm (0.3 to 3.1 in), as averages of 19.4 mm (0.76 in) and 41.1 mm (1.6 in) at different sites, and as "seldom exceed[ing] a length of two inches".

=== Breeding ===
The green kingfisher's breeding season varies geographically. In Central America it is during the dry season of spring and early summer. In Suriname and Guyana, it usually extends to August and occasionally to December or beyond. Breeding dates further south have not been documented. Both members of a pair excavate a nest burrow, almost always in an earthen bank of a stream or river. It is up to 1 m (3 ft) long with a small nest chamber at the end. The clutch size varies from two to six. The incubation period is 19 to 21 days; usually the female incubates at night and the parents alternate during the day. The young fledge 26 to 27 days after hatching and the parents chase juveniles from their territory about 29 days after fledging.

== Status ==
The IUCN has assessed the green kingfisher as being of Least Concern. It has an extremely large range. Its estimated population of about 20 million mature individuals is, however, believed to be decreasing. No immediate threats have been identified.
