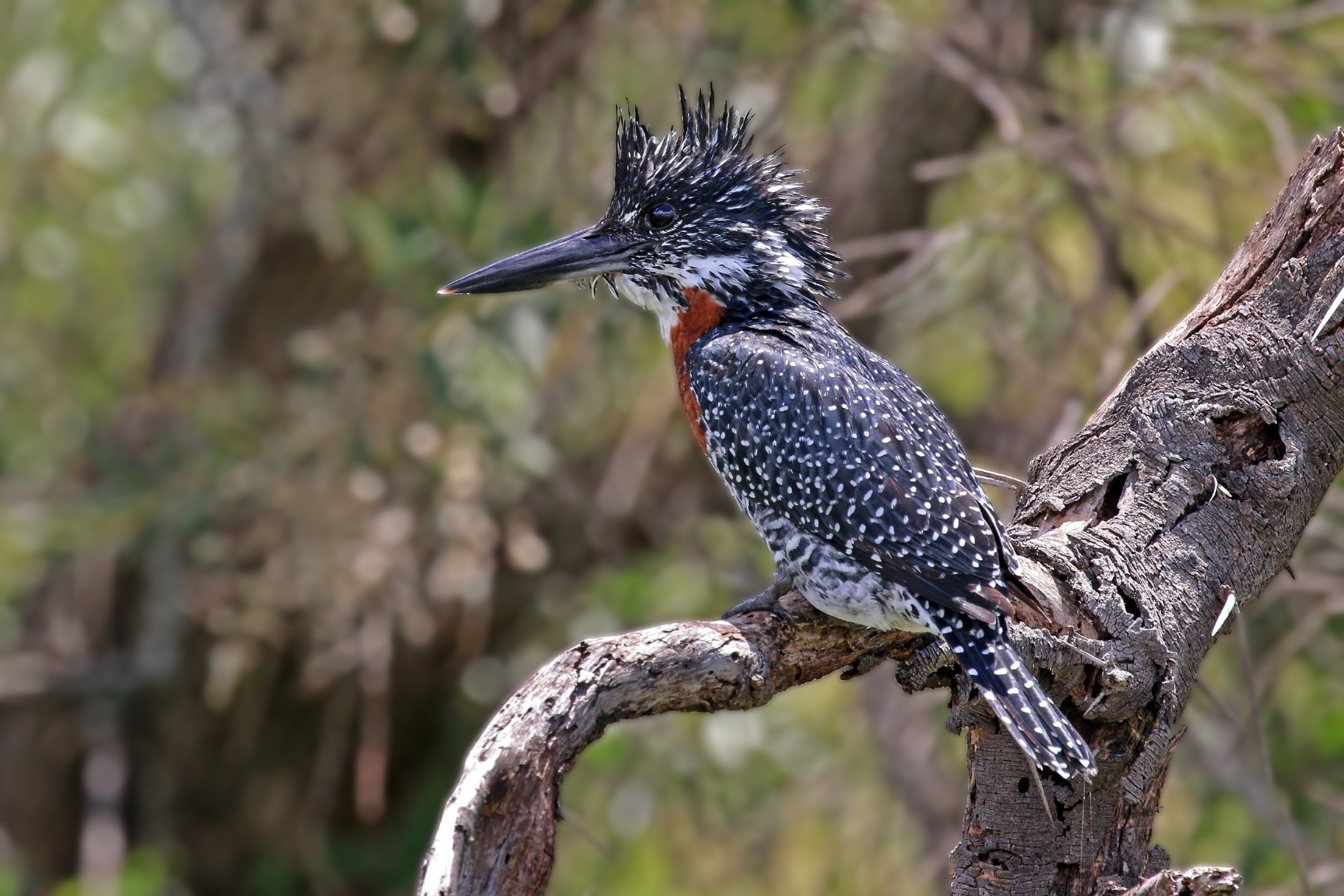
- Male, Lake Naivasha, Kenya
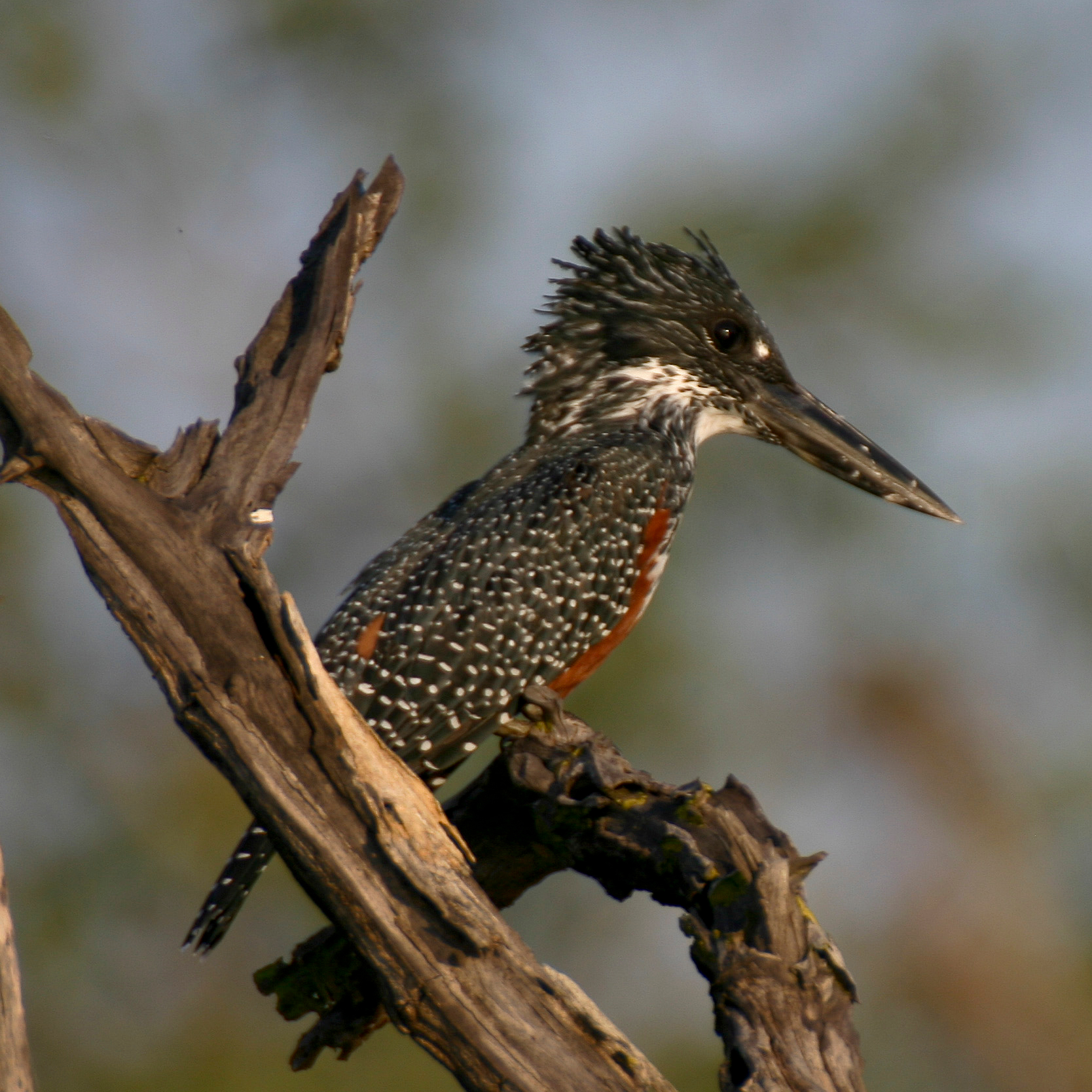
- Female near Triangle, Zimbabwe

Conservation status
- Least Concern (IUCN 3.1)

Scientific classification
- Kingdom: Animalia
- Phylum: Chordata
- Class: Aves
- Order: Coraciiformes
- Family: Alcedinidae
- Subfamily: Cerylinae
- Genus: Megaceryle
- Species: M. maxima

Binomial name
- Megaceryle maxima (Pallas, 1769)
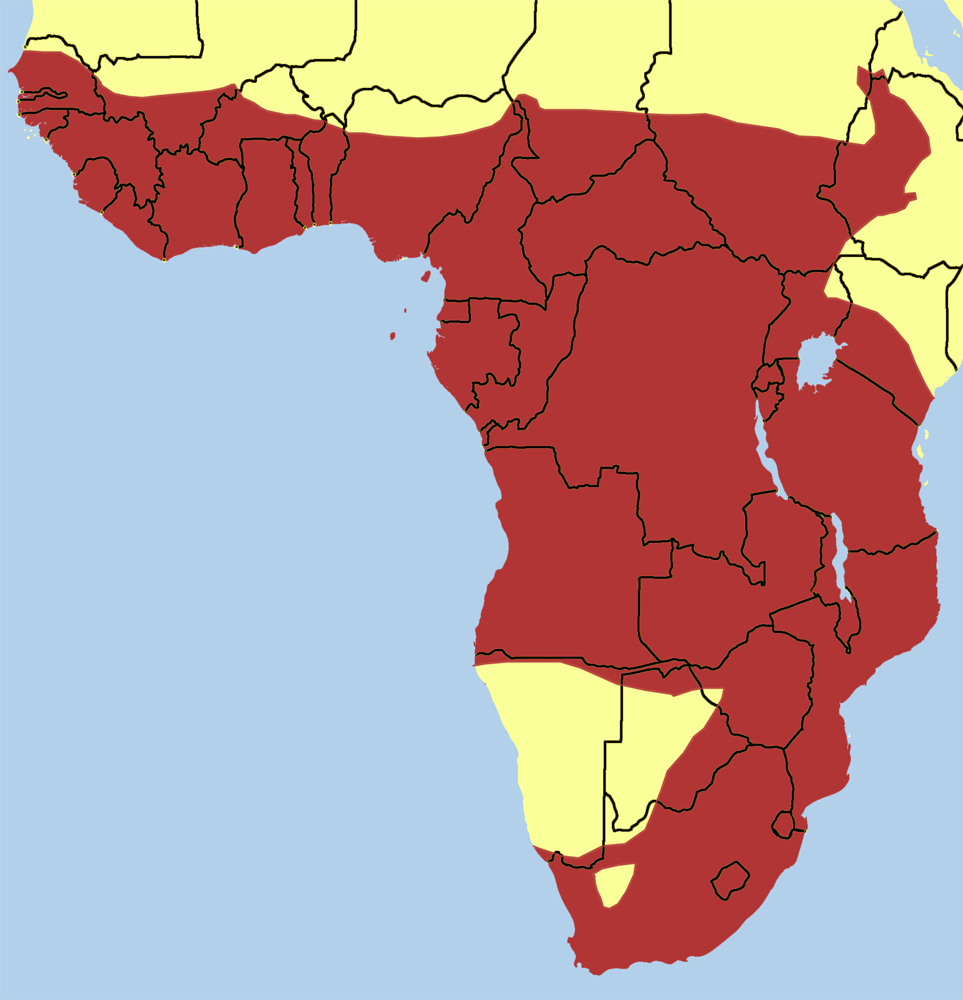
- distribution

= Giant kingfisher =

Species of bird

The giant kingfisher (Megaceryle maxima) is the largest kingfisher in Africa, where it is a resident breeding bird over most of the continent south of the Sahara Desert, other than the arid southwest.

== Taxonomy ==
The first formal description of the giant kingfisher was by the German naturalist Peter Simon Pallas in 1769 under the binomial name Alcedo maxima. The current genus Megaceryle was erected by the German naturalist Johann Jakob Kaup in 1848.

There are two subspecies:

- M. m. maxima (Pallas, 1769) – Senegal and Gambia to Ethiopia and south to South Africa
- M. m. gigantea (Swainson, 1837) – Liberia to northern Angola and western Tanzania, island of Bioko

The nominate subspecies M. m. maxima occurs in wooded savanna while M. m. gigantea prefers tropical rainforest.

== Description ==
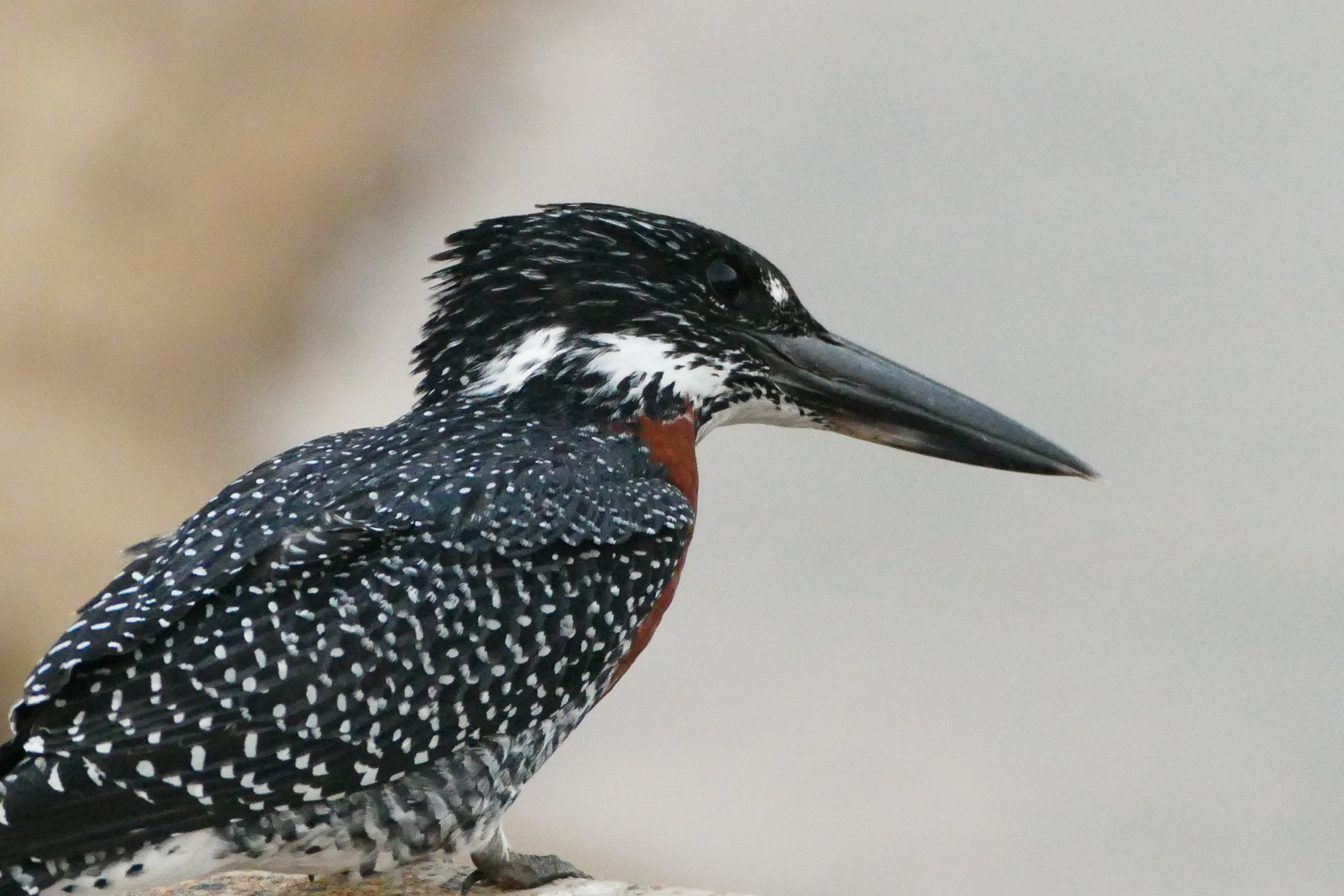
Giant Kingfisher perched in Kruger National Park.

The giant kingfisher is 42–46 cm (16.5–18 in) long, with a large shaggy crest, a large black bill and fine white spots on black upperparts. The male has a chestnut breast band and otherwise white underparts with dark flank barring. The female has a white-spotted black breast band and a chestnut belly. The forest race M. m. gigantea is darker, less spotted above, and more barred below than the nominate race, but the two forms intergrade along the forest edge zone.

The call is a loud wak wak wak.

== Behaviour ==
=== Breeding ===
In South Africa breeding takes place between September and January, in Zimbabwe from August to March, in Zambia March to April and in Liberia December to January.

The giant kingfisher is monogamous and a solitary breeder. The nest is a long horizontal tunnel that is excavated into a river bank by both sexes using their feet and bills. The entrance hole is 11 cm (4.3 in) high and 15 cm (5.9 in) wide. The tunnel is typically 2 m (6 ft 7 in) in length but a tunnel of 8.5 m (28 ft) has been recorded. A clutch of around three eggs is laid in a chamber at the end of the tunnel.

=== Feeding ===
This large species feeds on crabs, fish, and frogs, caught by diving from a perch.

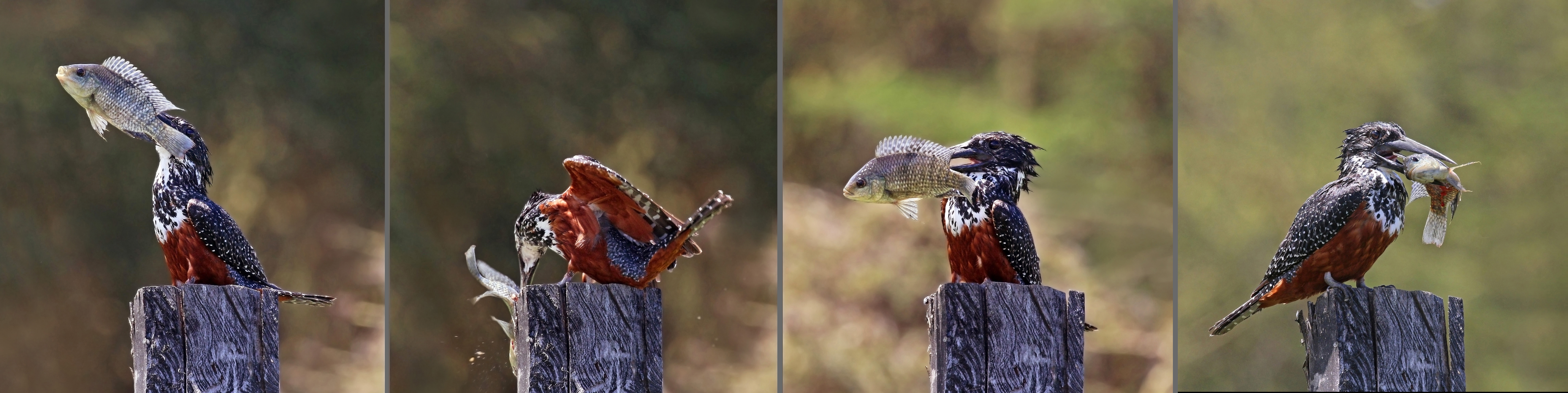
Female smashing a tilapia against a post to break its spine
Lake Naivasha, Kenya
