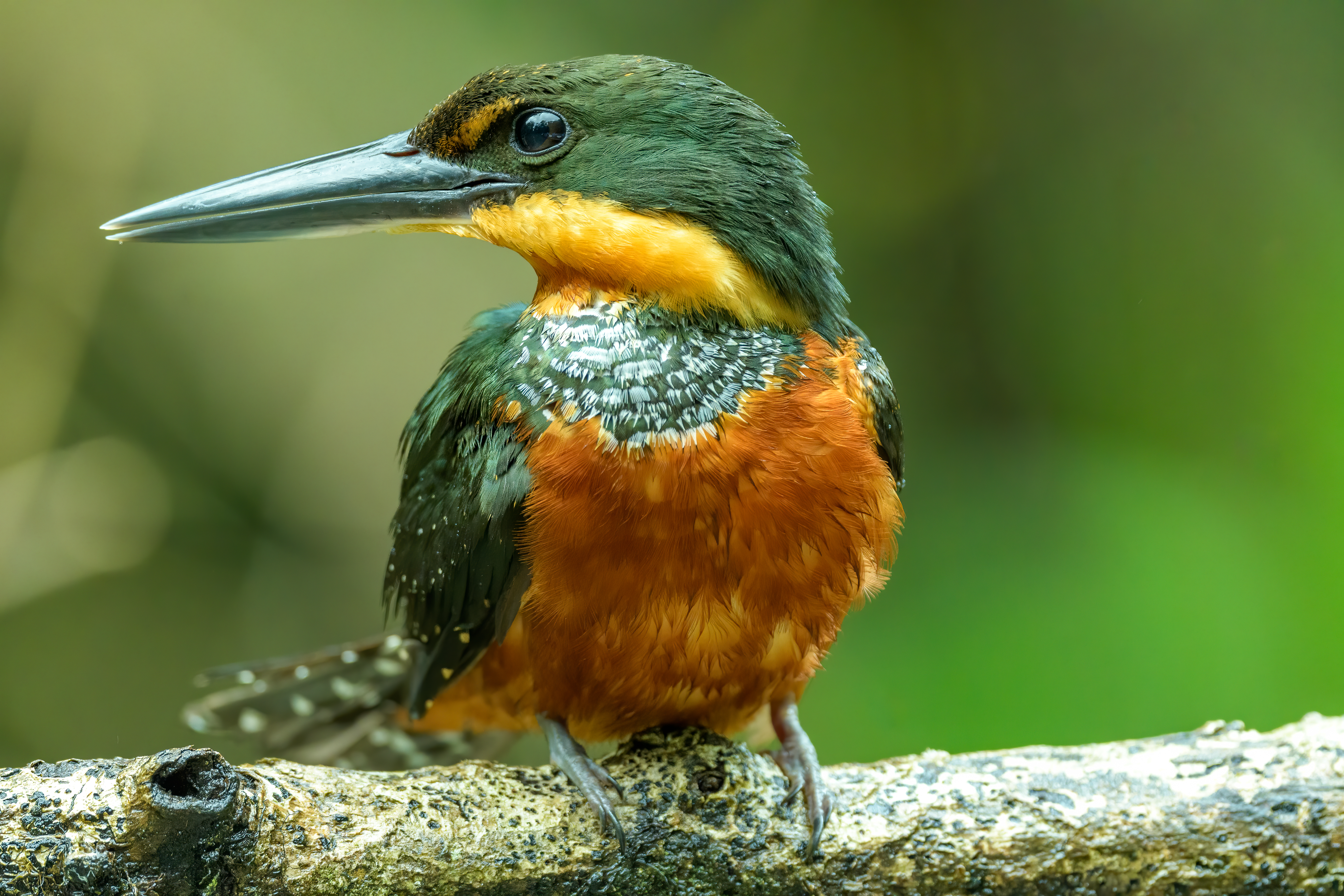
- Tortuguero National Park, Costa Rica

Conservation status
- Least Concern (IUCN 3.1)

Scientific classification
- Kingdom: Animalia
- Phylum: Chordata
- Class: Aves
- Order: Coraciiformes
- Family: Alcedinidae
- Subfamily: Cerylinae
- Genus: Chloroceryle
- Species: C. inda

Binomial name
- Chloroceryle inda (Linnaeus, 1766)

Synonyms
- Alcedo inda Linnaeus, 1766

= Green-and-rufous kingfisher =

Species of bird

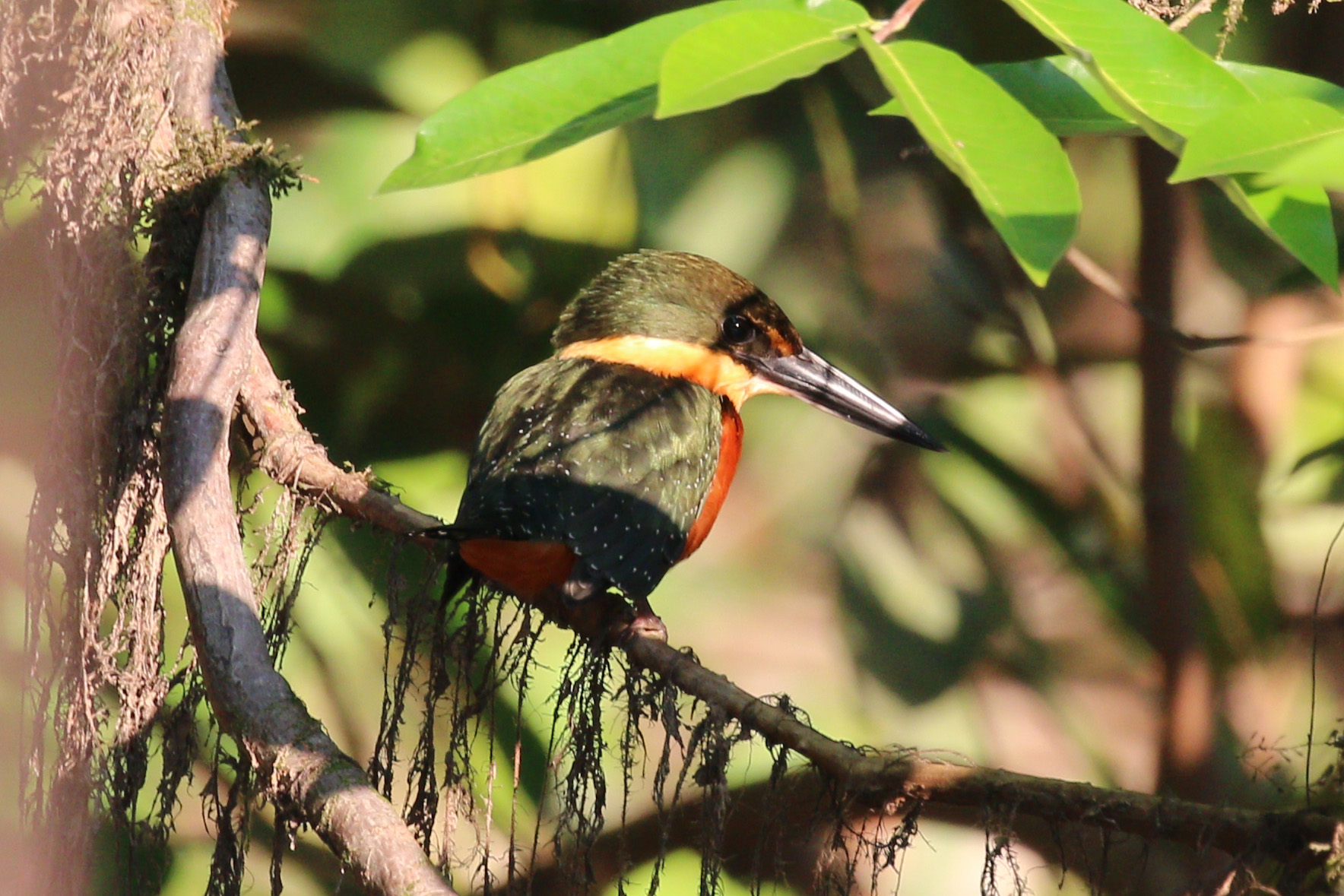
On the Cristalino River, Southern Amazon, Brazil

The green-and-rufous kingfisher (Chloroceryle inda) is a species of "water kingfisher" in subfamily Cerylinae of family Alcedinidae. It is found in the American tropics from Nicaragua to Panama and in every mainland South American country except Argentina, Chile, and Uruguay.

== Taxonomy and systematics ==
The first formal description of the green-and-rufous kingfisher was by the Swedish naturalist Carl Linnaeus in 1766 in the 12th edition of his Systema Naturae. He coined the binomial name Alcedo inda. Linnaeus based his description on George Edwards's "Spotted King's-Fisher" but mistakenly gave the type locality as India occidentali instead of Guiana. Linnaeus's specific epithet inda is from the Latin Indus for India. The current genus Chloroceryle was erected by Johann Jakob Kaup in 1848.

A molecular phylogenetic study published in 2006 found that the green-and-rufous kingfisher is a sister species to the smaller green kingfisher (C. americana).

Two subspecies of green-and-rufous kingfisher are recognized, the nominate C. i. inda (Linnaeus, 1766) and C. i. chocoensis Todd, 1943.

== Description ==
The green-and-rufous kingfisher is about 24 cm (9.4 in) long. Males weigh 40 to 60 g (1.4 to 2.1 oz) and females 53 to 62 g (1.9 to 2.2 oz). It has the typical kingfisher shape, with a somewhat shaggy crest and a long heavy bill. The bill is black with some pale yellow at the base of the mandible and its legs and feet are pinkish to dark gray. The two species have almost identical plumage, and the differences are similar to the variation present in each subspecies. Adult males have glossy green upperparts with a pale yellowish collar. Their upperwing coverts have white tips and their secondaries, tertials, and tail have small white spots. Their chin is yellow-buff, their throat buffy rufous, and the rest of their underparts are a rich dark rufous. Adult females are similar with the addition of a wide band of green with white speckles across their upper breast and more pale spotting on their upperparts. Juveniles resemble adult females with even heavier spotting on the upperparts; both sexes have a green breastband though the male's is thin.

== Distribution and habitat ==
The green-and-rufous kingfisher's nominate subspecies has by far the larger range of the two, and has three separate parts. The first is from southeastern Nicaragua through the Caribbean slope of Costa Rica and much of Panama's width into Colombia. The second extends from eastern Colombia east through Venezuela and the Guianas into eastern Brazil and south through most of Amazonian Brazil, Ecuador, Peru, Bolivia, and Paraguay. The third section of its range is along a narrow strip of southeastern Brazil from Bahia south to Santa Catarina. Subspecies C. i. chocoensis is found in western Colombia and northwestern Ecuador. An undocumented sight record in Argentina leads the South American Classification Committee of the American Ornithological Society to class the species as hypothetical in that country.

The green-and-rufous kingfisher inhabits streams and rivers, forested swamps, and mangroves. It favors densely vegetated banks and shuns open shorelines. It elevation it ranges from sea level to 400 m (1,300 ft).

== Behavior ==
=== Movement ===
The green-and-rufous kingfisher is assumed to be sedentary but is known to disperse locally into flooded forest.

=== Feeding ===
The green-and-rufous kingfisher hunts from a low perch from which it dives into water for its prey. It favors shaded perches over open ones and does not hover like some other kingfishers. Its diet includes small fish such as those of families Characidae, Cichlidae, and Cyprinodontidae, crabs, shrimps, and aquatic insects.

=== Breeding ===
The green-and-rufous kingfisher's breeding season varies geographically. In northern Brazil it spans from July to November and is believed to include February in Panama. It has not been defined elsewhere. It excavates a tunnel with a nest chamber at the end in an earthen stream or river bank. The clutch size is three to five eggs; the incubation period and time to fledging are not known.

=== Vocalization ===
The green-and-rufous kingfisher's song is "thin, high-pitched notes, 'week week week'." It has a variety of calls including a "chip-chip-chip", a "hard, rolling 'drrrt'", a "crackling 'trit-trit-trit'", and a "twitter followed by rapidly repeated, low 'too-too-too-too'".

== Status ==
The IUCN has assessed the green-and-rufous kingfisher as being of Least Concern. It has a very large range. Its estimated population of at least a half million mature individuals is, however, believed to be decreasing. No immediate threats have been identified.
