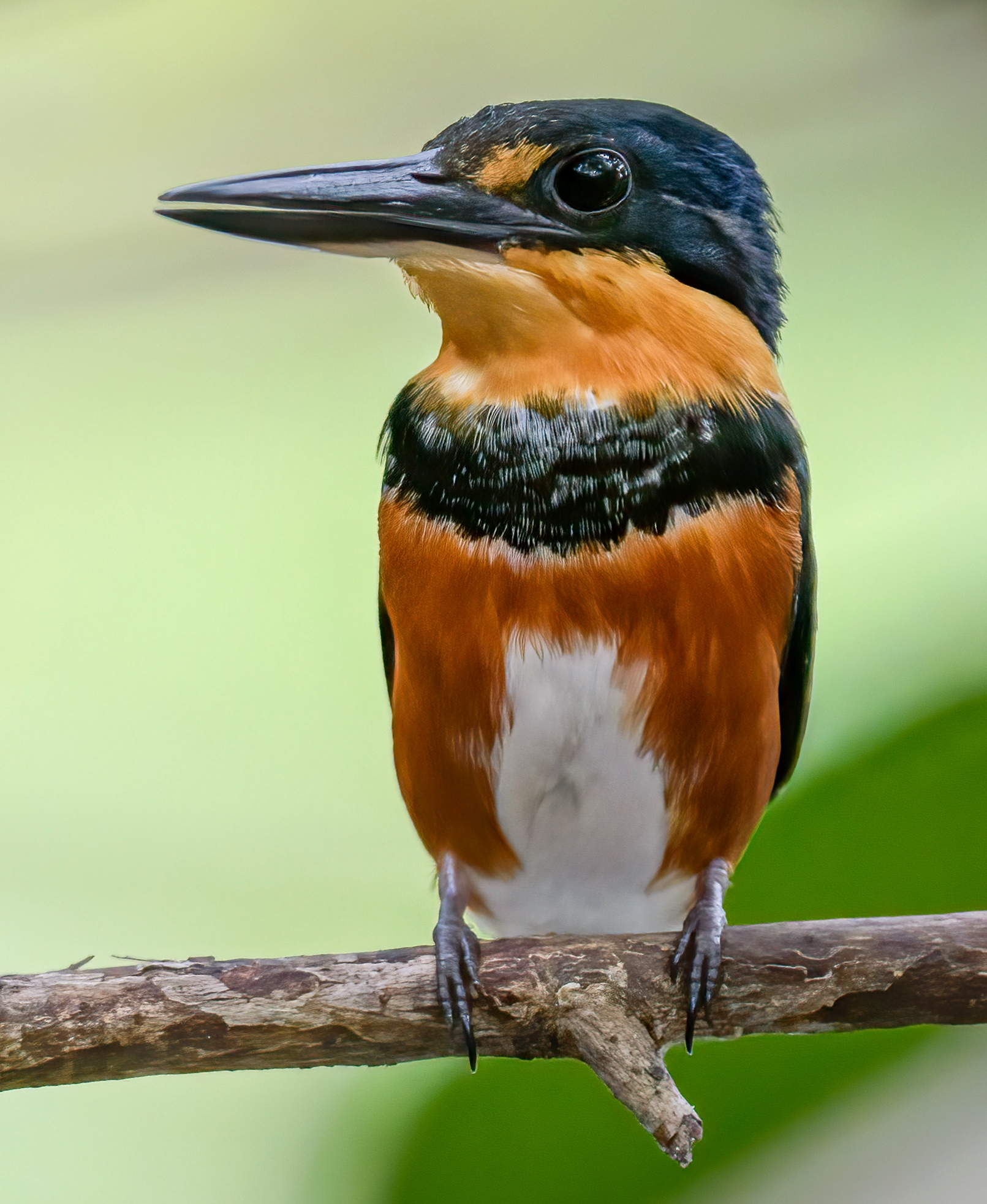
- A female American pygmy kingfisher in Costa Rica. Chloroceryle aenea is the type species.

Scientific classification
- Kingdom: Animalia
- Phylum: Chordata
- Class: Aves
- Order: Coraciiformes
- Family: Alcedinidae
- Subfamily: Cerylinae
- Genus: Chloroceryle; Kaup, 1848

Type species
- Alcedo superciliosa =Alcedo aenea Linnaeus, 1766

Species
- C. amazona C. americana C. inda C. aenea

= American green kingfisher =

American green kingfishers

Genus of birds

The American green kingfishers are the kingfisher genus Chloroceryle, which are native to tropical Central and South America, with one species extending north to south Texas.

== Taxonomy and species ==
The genus Chloroceryle was introduced in 1848 by the German naturalist Johann Jakob Kaup. Kaup did not specify a type species but Richard Bowdler Sharpe designated the American pygmy kingfisher in 1871. The genus name combines the Ancient Greek khlōros meaning "green" with the genus Ceryle that was introduced by Friedrich Boie in 1828.

Phylogeny

- Chloroceryle
  - Amazon kingfisher
  - - American pygmy kingfisher
    - - Green-and-rufous kingfisher
      - Green kingfisher

Cladogram based on Andersen et al. (2017)

The genus contains four species:

Genus Chloroceryle – Kaup, 1848 – four species
Common name	Scientific name and subspecies	Range	Size and ecology	IUCN status and estimated population
American pygmy kingfisher Male Female	Chloroceryle aenea (Pallas, 1764) Two subspecies: C. a. aenea (Pallas, 1764); C. a. stictoptera (Ridgway, 1884)	southern Mexico south through Central America to western Ecuador, and then around the northern Andes cordillera in the east to central Bolivia and central Brazil.	Size: Habitat: Diet:	LC
Green-and-rufous kingfisher Male Female	Chloroceryle inda (Linnaeus, 1766) Two subspecies: C. i. inda (Linnaeus, 1766); C. i. chocoensis Todd, 1943	Nicaragua to northern Bolivia, southeastern Brazil, western Colombia, northwestern Ecuador	Size: Habitat: Diet:	LC
Green kingfisher Male Female	Chloroceryle americana (Gmelin, JF, 1788) Five subspecies: C. a. hachisukai (Laubmann, 1941); C. a. septentrionalis (Sharpe, 1892); C. a. americana (Gmelin, JF, 1788); C. a. mathewsii Laubmann, 1927; C. a. cabanisii (Tschudi, 1846)	southern Texas in the United States south through Central and South America to central Argentina.	Size: Habitat: Diet:	LC
Amazon kingfisher Male Female	Chloroceryle amazona (Latham, 1790)	southern Mexico south through Central America to northern Argentina.	Size: Habitat: Diet:	LC

== Habits and appearance ==
The American green kingfishers breed by streams in forests or mangroves, nesting in a long horizontal tunnel made in a river bank. These birds take crustaceans and fish caught by the usual kingfisher technique of a dive from a perch or brief hover, although the American pygmy kingfisher will hawk at insects in flight.

They have the typical kingfisher shape, with a short tail and long bill. All are plumaged oily green above, and the underpart colour shows an interesting pattern insofar as the smallest and second largest, American pygmy kingfisher and green-and-rufous kingfisher, have rufous underparts, whereas the largest and second smallest, Amazon kingfisher and green kingfisher, have white underparts with only the males also having a rufous breast band.

== Evolutionary history ==
These water kingfishers are descended from a common ancestor which seems to have been closely related to a progenitor of the pied kingfisher (which at that stage had not yet lost the metallic plumage tone), and are similar in plumage and habits (Moyle, 2006). All four have overlapping ranges, and may fish the same waters; however the weight ratio of aenea: americana: inda: amazona is almost exactly 1:2:4:8, which prevents direct competition for food. The ringed kingfisher, Megaceryle torquata, a more distant relative, also occurs on the same rivers, but is twice as heavy as the Amazon kingfisher.

Genetically, the largest species, C. amazona, is the most distantly related, while the medium-sized (but differently colored) C. americana and C. inda are sister species. The differing coloration therefore does not indicate their evolutionary history, but rather seems to have evolved independently, to underscore the visual distinctness between taxa, thus helping to keep their gene pools separate (see also Competitive exclusion principle).
