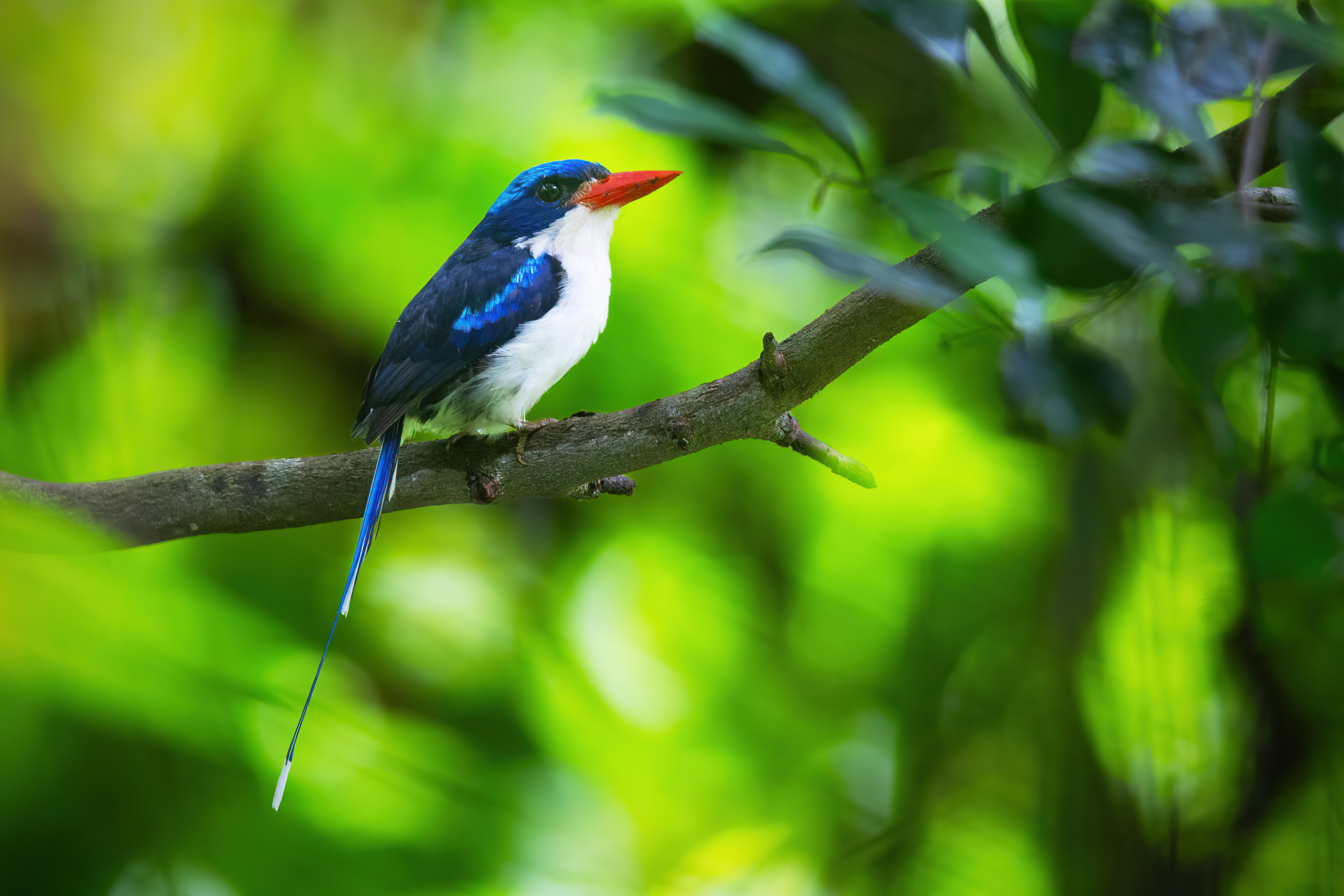

Conservation status
- Least Concern (IUCN 3.1)

Scientific classification
- Kingdom: Animalia
- Phylum: Chordata
- Class: Aves
- Order: Coraciiformes
- Family: Alcedinidae
- Subfamily: Halcyoninae
- Genus: Tanysiptera
- Species: T. galatea

Binomial name
- Tanysiptera galatea Gray, 1859

= Papuan paradise kingfisher =

Species of bird

The Papuan paradise kingfisher (Tanysiptera galatea), also known as the common paradise kingfisher, Galatea paradise kingfisher and the racquet-tailed kingfisher, is a species of bird in the family Alcedinidae. It is found in subtropical or tropical moist lowland forests of New Guinea. Like all paradise kingfishers, it has a red bill and colourful plumage. The species is common and the IUCN has assessed its conservation status as being of "least concern".

== Taxonomy ==
The common paradise kingfisher was first described by the English zoologist George Robert Gray in 1859 based on specimens collected by Alfred Russel Wallace near "Dorey" (modern Manokwari in western New Guinea). Gray coined the current binomial name Tanysiptera galatea. The genus Tanysiptera had been introduced by the Irish zoologist Nicholas Aylward Vigors in 1825. The name Tanysiptera is from classical Greek tanusipteros meaning 'long-feathered'. The specific epithet galatea is from Greek mythology: Galatea was a sea nymph.

There are 4 recognised subspecies.

- T. g. galatea Gray, GR, 1859 – northwest New Guinea and the west Raja Ampat Islands
- T. g. meyeri Salvadori, 1889 – north New Guinea
- T. g. minor Salvadori & D'Albertis, 1875 – south New Guinea
- T. g. vulcani Rothschild & Hartert, 1915 – Manam Island (off northeast New Guinea)

This species, under the vernacular name "common paradise kingfisher", formerly included 15 subspecies. In 2026 11 of the subspecies were separated to create 5 new species mainly based on differences in vocalization. At the same time, the English name "common paradise kingfisher" was changed to "Papuan paradise kingfisher".

The former subspecies are:

- Morotai paradise kingfisher (Tanysiptera doris)
- Halmahera paradise kingfisher (Tanysiptera margarethae)
- Obi paradise kingfisher (Tanysiptera obiensis)
- Amboyna paradise kingfisher (Tanysiptera nais)
- Rossel paradise kingfisher (Tanysiptera rosseliana)

The Biak paradise kingfisher (Tanysiptera riedelii) and the Kofiau paradise kingfisher (Tanysiptera ellioti) have sometimes been considered as subspecies of the common paradise kingfisher.

== Description ==
This kingfisher has a red bill, a dark turquoise cap with brighter blue edges, blackish cheeks, and bluish-black upper parts. The under parts are white and the under-wing coverts are blue and white. The central tail feathers are elongated and their base is blue. It is similar in appearance to the buff-breasted paradise kingfisher (Tanysiptera sylvia) apart from the colour of the breast, and in some parts of Papua New Guinea, both birds coexist.

== History ==
The bird is described in Alfred Russel Wallace's The Malay Archipelago (1869).

I also obtained one or two specimens of the fine racquet-tailed kingfisher of Amboyna, Tanysiptera nais, one of the most singular and beautiful of that beautiful family. These birds differ from all other kingfishers (which have usually short tails) by having the two middle tail-feathers immensely lengthened and very narrowly webbed, but terminated by a spoon shaped enlargement, as in the motmots and some of the humming-birds. They belong to that division of the family termed king-hunters, living chiefly on insects and small land-molluscs, which they dart down upon and pick up from the ground, just as a kingfisher picks a fish out of the water. They are confined to a very limited area, comprising the Moluccas, New Guinea, and Northern Australia. About ten species of these birds are now known, all much resembling each other, but yet sufficiently distinguishable in every locality. The Amboynese species, of which a very accurate representation is here given, is one of the largest and handsomest. It is full seventeen inches long to the tips of the tail-feathers; the bill is coral red, the under-surface pure white, the back and wings deep purple, while the shoulders, head and nape, and some spots on the upper part of the back and wings, are pure azure blue. The tail is white, with the feathers narrowly blue-edged, but the narrow part of the long feathers is rich blue. This was an entirely new species, and has been well named after an ocean goddess [a Naiad], by Mr. R. G. Gray.

— Wallace

== Distribution ==
The common paradise kingfisher is found in the forested interior of New Guinea and on some of the offshore islands to the north. Its distribution is rather patchy and it mostly occurs below 500 m (1,600 ft) on the mainland and 820 m (2,700 ft) on Karkar Island. On some islands it is replaced by sister species; the Biak paradise kingfisher (T. riedelii) on Biak Island; the Kofiau paradise kingfisher (T. ellioti) on Kofiau Island; and the Numfor paradise kingfisher (T. carolinae) on Numfor Island. It seems that each of these island species originated from founding T. galatea birds which became isolated from the mainland birds and underwent a "genetic revolution". There were no particular biotic factors involved, but there was sufficient variation among the founding birds to encourage speciation, and the assortment of genes that the birds on each island received was later undisturbed by the inflow of alien genes.

== Ecology ==
This species is common and mostly non-migratory, although some birds move out of monsoon rainforest in the dry season. A pair will defend a territory of 0.3 to 0.5 hectares (0.7 to 1.2 acres). The nest is made in an active termite nest in a tree. The termites build a termitarium against the tree trunk and the birds excavate a hole in its earthen wall, which can be as much as 15 cm (6 in) long leading to a 13 cm (5 in) chamber at the end. They usually try several sites before selecting one. A clutch of about five eggs are laid between November and March and both parents care for the young.

The diet consists of such invertebrates as earthworms, grasshoppers, beetles, caterpillars, centipedes and snails, and occasionally lizards. The bird perches upright on a low branch, remaining stationary for long periods, apart from occasionally twisting its head or flicking its tail. On seeing movement below, it swoops to the forest floor to pounce, returning with its prey to the branch. The victim may be dismembered, or subdued by bashing it against the branch. Some insects are plucked off foliage, while earthworms are sought by foraging through the leaf litter and probing the leafmould with its beak.

== Status ==
T. galatea has a very wide range and is reported to be common. The population trend for this bird is thought to be downward as logging takes place in its forest habitat, but the rate of decline is not great enough to cause concern and the International Union for Conservation of Nature has assessed its conservation status as being of "least concern".
