= Luhu =

Luhu may refer to:

- Luhu, Indonesia, small town in Seram Island
- Luhu language, an Austronesian language spoken in the west of Seram Island
- Type 052 destroyer (Luhu class destroyer), one of the first modern multi-role guided missile destroyers built by China.
- Hohhot Black Horse (Shanxi Wosen Luhu)
