= Indonesian invasion of South Maluku =

1950–1966 anti-separatist military operation

- Part of the Age of Gerombolan
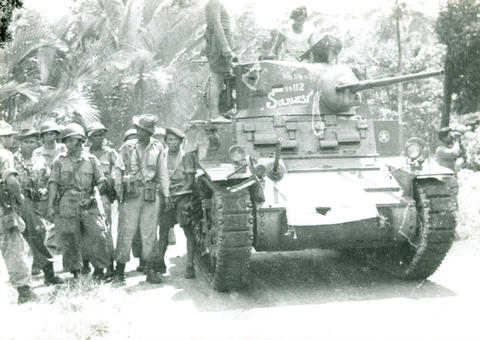
- Animated map of the invasion Indonesian Army M3 Stuart tank and troops patrolling in Ambon
| Date | May 1950 – 6 December 1966 |
| Location | Maluku (province), Indonesia |
| Result | Indonesian victory |
| Territorial changes | Indonesian annexes entire South Maluku |

Belligerents
| Indonesia; ABRI | Republic of South Maluku; Armed Forces of RMS (APRMS); Militias |

Commanders and leaders
| (Indonesia) Sukarno; (Indonesia) Alexander Kawilarang; (Indonesia) Col. Abdullah †; (Indonesia) Slamet Riyadi †; (Indonesia) Slamet Sudiarto † | Chris Soumokil (executed); Dantje Jacob Samson (surrendered); Isaac Julius Tamaëla; Dominggus Sopacua (POW); Corputty (executed) |

The Indonesian invasion of South Maluku was a series of military campaigns and subsequent counter-insurgency operations conducted by the armed forces of the Republic of Indonesia (APRIS/TNI) against the Republic of South Maluku (RMS) following the latter's declaration of independence on April 25, 1950. The initial invasion phase saw Indonesian forces rapidly occupy key islands such as Buru, Kai, Tanimbar, and the administrative center of Ambon City by November 1950.

Following the defeat on Ambon, the RMS government and its remaining forces retreated to the island of Seram, initiating a protracted guerrilla conflict that lasted over a decade. The insurgency continued until the capture of RMS President Dr. Chris Soumokil in December 1963, although low-level resistance persisted thereafter.

== Background ==
Following the Dutch recognition of Indonesian sovereignty in late 1949, the political structure of the former Dutch East Indies was reorganized. However, tensions remained high in eastern Indonesia, particularly among Ambonese Christians who had formed the backbone of the Royal Netherlands East Indies Army (KNIL). Fearing marginalization and violence under the centralized Republic of Indonesia, they sought independence. On April 25, 1950, the Republic of South Maluku (RMS) was unilaterally declared independent, leading the Indonesian government to authorize military action to suppress the separatist movement and integrate the region into the unitary state.

== Campaign ==
=== Outlying islands ===
The invasion started with naval operations against the outlying islands, led by colonel Abdullah. The Barat Daya Islands in the south were captured in May 1950 without a fight, followed by the Aru Islands (3 June), Tanimbar (25 July), Kai (30 July), Geser (6 August) and Banda Neira (August).

=== Buru island ===
Under the cover of naval artillery from the Patti Unus, the APRIS forces landed unopposed at Lala, a village 5 kilometres (3 miles) north of Namlea, at 09.30 hours, 14 July 1950. The first battalion to land, the Pattimura Battalion, advanced south towards the town of Namlea. The first engagement against APRMS defenders occurred at Milestone 4 north of Namlea. Due to the preparedness of APRMS forces which fired towards the APRIS advancing in open terrain, APRIS forces lost three men from hostile fire.

Under heavy APRMS fire, two APRIS platoons conducted a pincer manoeuvre against APRMS defenders at Milestone 4, managing to dislodge the defenders and advance into Namlea town by afternoon of 14 July.

At 01.00 hours, 15 July, APRMS forces under the command of Sergeant Daud Lesteluhu advanced into Namlea town and engaged an APRIS company. During the ensuing firefight, Lesteluhu was captured by APRIS forces and taken prisoner. Lesteluhu was taken aboard the Patti Unus to meet Colonel Alex Kawilarang to negotiate a surrender. Lesteluhu acknowledged that he had fallen victim to RMS "provocateurs" and agreed to provide his service to APRIS.

Although they had lost their commander, throughout 15 July APRMS forces still put up fierce resistance inside Namlea town, while APRIS forces had secured positions along the coast and on the hills surrounding Namlea. On 0530 hours, 16 July, APRIS forces forced their way into Namlea town and defeated the APRMS defenders, while three Higgins boats commandeered by APRMS soldiers fled the harbour. The Patti Unus sunk two and captured one. By 0700 hours, 16 July, Namlea was secured by APRIS forces.

=== Battle of Ambon ===
On 28 September 1950 Indonesian forces landed on the Ambon island capturing Tulehu. The following days the captured Hitu, Suli and Natsepa. On 4 October after consolidation, APRMS attacked Hasal and Telaga Kodok and pushed back TNI troops. Meanwhile, on October 7, 1950, APRMS attacked Hitu again.

On 7 October Indonesian forces captured Wanat and Telaga Kodok. On November 3, 1950, troops from Lieutenant Colonel Slamet Riyadi's group and Major Surjo Subandrio's group moved together to ambush the RMS defenses at Waitatiri. Two days later Indonesian troops capturing fortified Fort Victoria in Ambon city. Rebels moved to a hill southeast of the town which was captured by the Indonesian forces on 10 November. Until 15 November the entire Ambon town was captured by Indonesian forces followed by the Laha airport on 16 November.

On 1 December an Australian reporter who departed the island, reported that fighting was still going on on the outskirs of Ambon city and Laha airport. Eventually in December rebels departed the island for Seram. The RMS attempted a guerrilla campaign in Haruku and Saparua, but these were captured by APRIS without any casualties. On 23 December rebels launched a raid on the Ambon island temporarily regaining the Lateri town.

=== Seram island ===
On 21 July 1950 Indonesian forces landed on the northwest part of the Seram Island capturing Piru followed by Amahai the next day. Meanwhile, from the east, the Abdullah battalion advanced from the Geser island capturing Bula on 2 September, followed by Kilmuri (9 September), Atiahu (10 September) and Werinama (September). After capturing Atiaho and Werinama, APRIS troops moved towards Polim, Laha, and Lalim. On 18 September Kobi was occupied without significant resistance. Commander Major Abdullah was killed in a landing battle in the Laha of southern Ceram on 25 September.

On 27 September separatists launched a major counteroffensive recapturing Latu, Ramahkai, Kairatu, and Tihulale. On 13 October Indonesian forces continued operations capturing Wahai on the north coast followed by Tehoru on 18 October on the southern coast. Operational movements were then continued to Opin, Besi, Sawal, Horale, so that by December Labuhan could be reached.

On 27 May 1951 Indonesian forces captured Suakraja on the northern coast followed by Taniwel on 29 May. On 29 June Indonesian forces landed in Elpaputih. Around that time during the dry season the military overran Seti village in the Seram hinterland. A later offensive managed to overran multiple Maneo villages including Maneo Rendah and Kabailu. On 21 September armed forces recaptured Kairatu following a naval landing. On 7 November an operation was launched to occupy interior near the Piru town.

In April 1952 it was reported that 20,000 militias armed mostly with bows and arrows supported by 3,000 trained South Moluccan troops were still resisting on the island. In January 1956 a heavy fighting was reported on the southern and northern part of the island with Indonesian advances being brought to a standstill. On 12 January the Indonesian garrison in Taniwel was forced to surrender after being surrounded by rebels.

On December 19, 1960, the daily newspaper 'Pedoman' reported that a company of the Mobrig (Company 5157) in Southwest Seram had clashed with an APRMS unit. On 5 October 1961 communiqué from the APRMS information service reported that 32 enemy battalions attempt to penetrate the interior. In December 1961 Indonesian offensive halted again. Reconnaissance patrols of the TNI were forced to be resupplied from the air. In January 1962 it was reported the APRMS rebels controlled large parts of the interior as well as the coastal strip from Murnaten to Kawa.

In March 1963 Indonesia announced the arrest of colonel Rugebregt (military advisor to Dr. Soumokil) and the surrender of Lieutant Elwarin with 153 men of his. On 19 October Antara reported the capture of two important associates of President Soumokil. Dr. Soumokil, the mastermind of the RMS separatist movement, was captured along with his family in a hut in Waitoto, a 14-hour journey from the Sawai coast of Seram Island. Four days later on 6 December South Moluccan chief of staff Sopamena was captured. Soumokil was executed by firing squad on 13 April 1966, on Pulau Ubi Basar by forces loyal to Suharto. On 6 December 1966 the last South Moluccan rebel leader, Docianus Ony Sahalessy was arrested by Indonesia.
