= Niwelehu =

Village in Seram Bagian Barat, Maluku Province, Indonesia

- Village
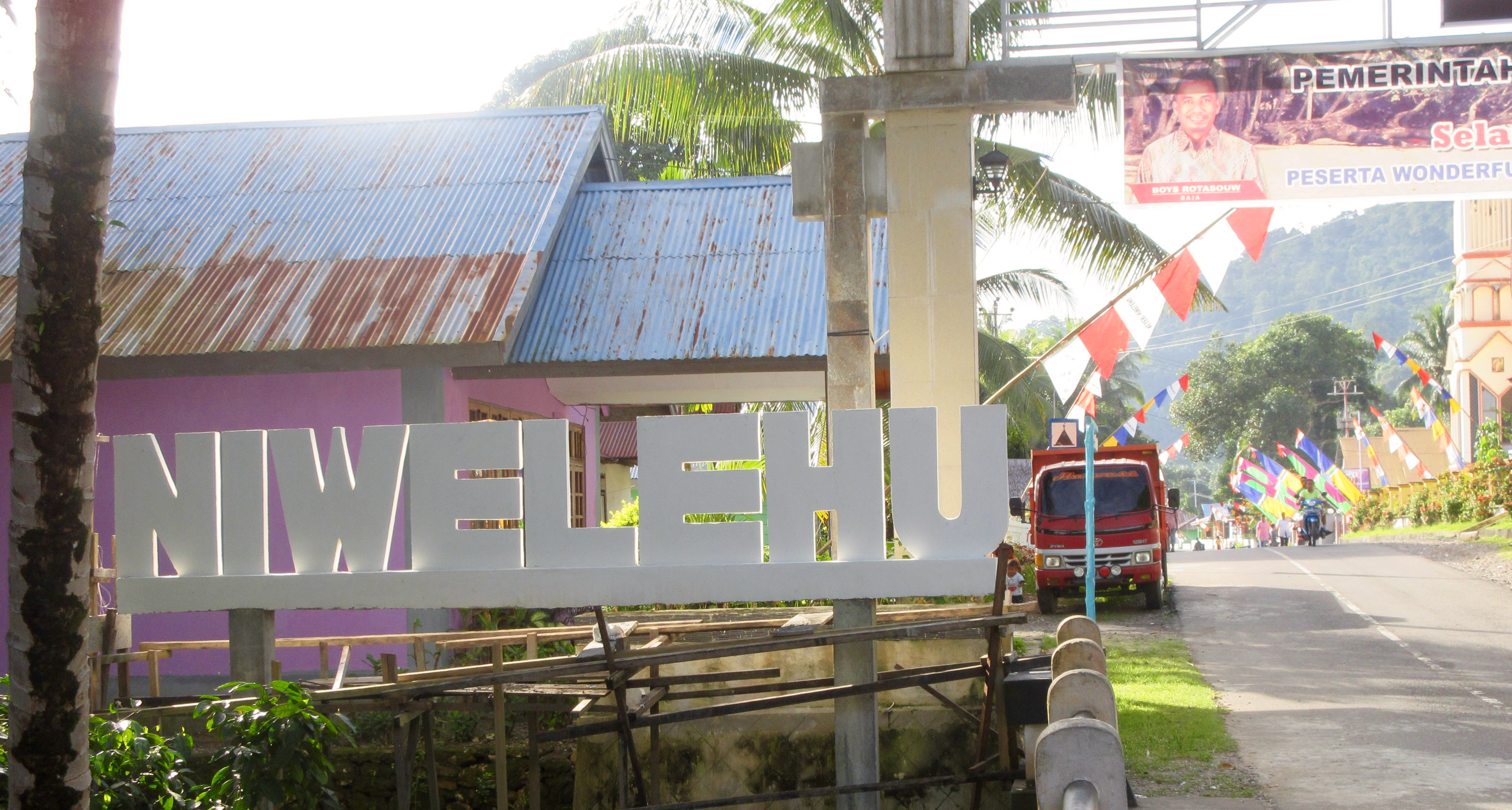
- The entrance of Niwelehu

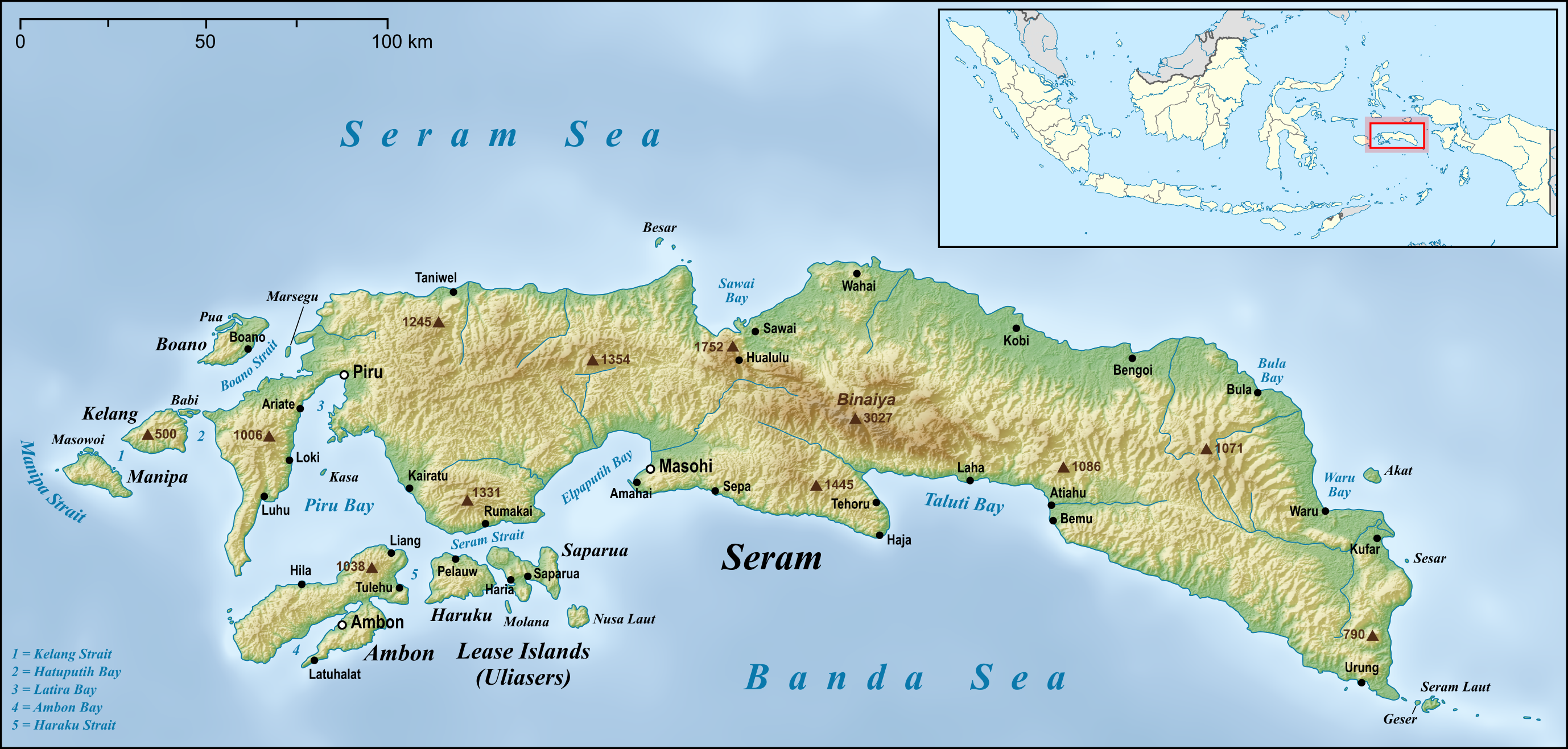
- Location in Indonesia Location in the Maluku Islands Location in Seram Island
- Coordinates: 2°52′S 128°23′E
- Country: Indonesia
- Province: Maluku
- Regency: West Seram
- Ministry of Home Affairs code: 81.06.03.2003

Niwelehu is a small village located in the northern part of Taniwel, a district of the Indonesian island of Seram.

== Politics ==
=== Political System ===
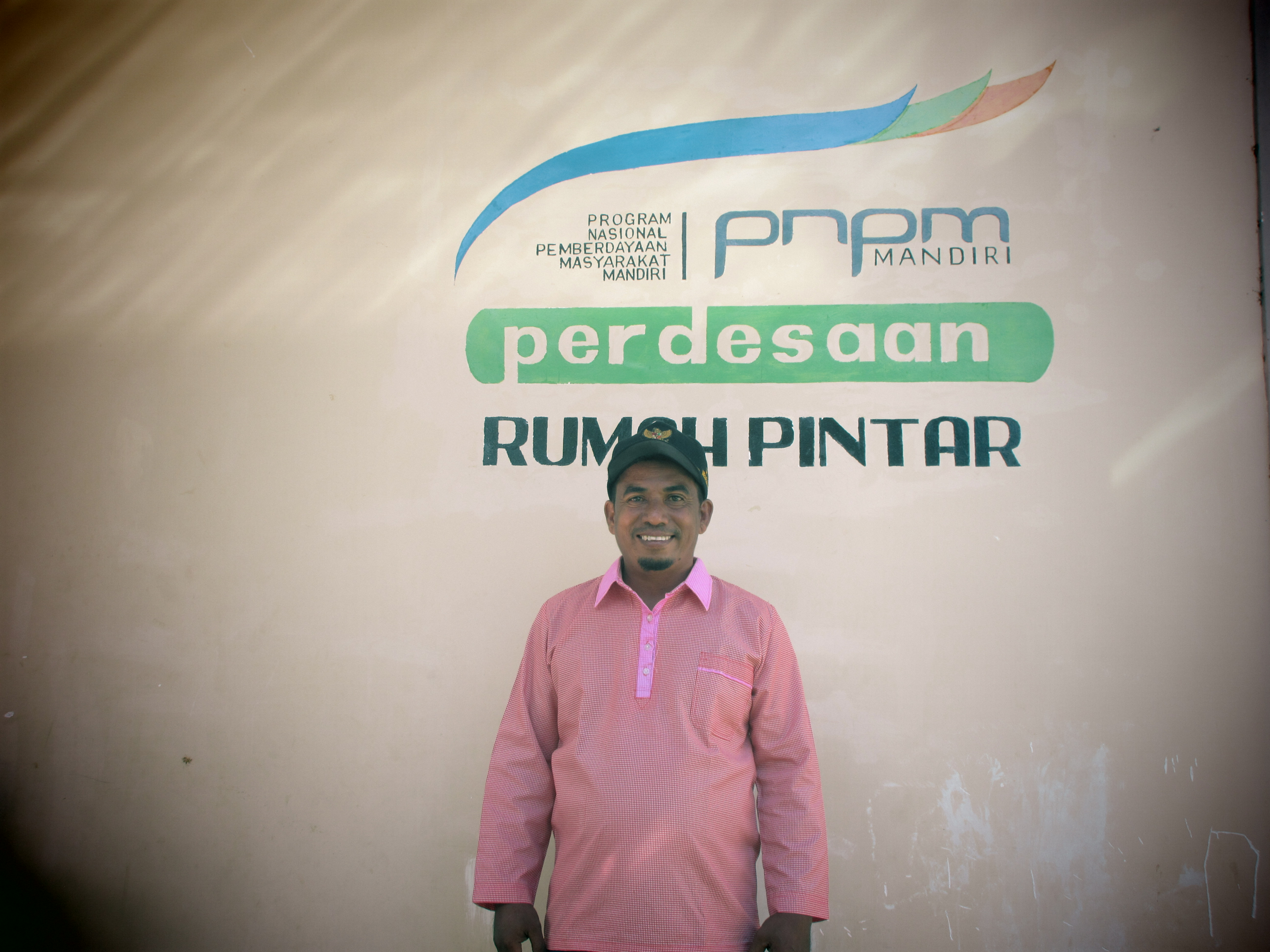
The current Raja, Boys Rotasouw

The highest ranked political figure in the Niwelehu village government is the Raja, which is Bahasa Indonesia for ‘king’. Because of this, Niwelehu technically operates under a monarchic political system. However, the king is still elected by the people and there is a village government. The current Raja is Boys Rotasouw. He has been in power since 2013.

Because of the historical past of the village, only people with the last name Rotasouw or Latumakulita are eligible to be Raja. The Raja position is also open to women. The first Raja, Arleka Rotasouw, ruled during the colonization by the Portuguese in the 1800s. Layin Patty Rotasouw was the first Raja after the independence of the Maluku Islands.

History of Rajas
No	Mandate	Name
1	Under Portuguese Colony	Arleka Rotasouw
2	Under Netherlands Colony	Piata Rotasouw
3	1901–1930	Layin Patty Rotasouw
4	1930–1945	Arnold Rotasouw
5	1955–1992	Cosmus Rotasouw
6	1993–2003	Hendrik Rotasouw
7	2003–2012	Arnold Latumakulita
8	2013 - now	Boys Rotasouw

=== Village Government ===
The king of Niwelehu is the most important political figure in the village. However, there are village institutions that allow the government to be balanced. As of 2017, there are ten village government institutions that vary from the parliament to women entrepreneurship and youth. At the head of every village institution, there is a responsible who represents the institution at the village parliament. The ten institutions are: Village parliament; Women and family empowerment institution; Youth Institution; Farmer Institution; Fisherman Institution; Art Institution; Health Care Management Institution; Economic Enterprise Institution; Community Empowerment Management Institution; and the Women Entrepreneurship Institution.

== Religion ==
The Church of Niwelehu

When it comes to religion, Niwelehu villagers believed in animism until the year 1901. Nature is a very important part of Maluku culture. However, in the 20th century, Christianity became the dominant religion in the village. Historically, there have been many religious wars in the Maluku Islands. For this reason, the Muslim villagers of Niwelehu live in a neighbouring village, Wee village. Nowadays, relationship between Christians and Muslims in Niwelehu is very friendly and they accept and co-live with each other.

Niwelehu is a Protestant village. Religion is a very important part of the culture. After the King, one of the most important and influential figures of the village is the pastor.

== Geography ==
Niwelehu is at the north-west of West-Seram Island, which is one of the main islands of the famous Maluku Islands, also known as the Spice Islands. The territory of the village is 101.15 km^{2}. This figure includes the surrounding forest that villagers use for farming. The village itself is very small and only contains 69 houses.

Niwelehu is part of the sub-district of Taniwel which is located in the North Seram District. The village is 12 km from Taniwel and 60 km away from Piru, which is the capital city of West Seram. At the north of Niwelehu is the Seram Sea, which is connected to the Pacific Ocean. South of Niwelehu, there is the West Seram Jungle. West of Niwelehu is the Nikulukan village, which is a Christian village. Finally, east of Niwelehu there is the Nuniali village. The 'Muslim' Niwelehu village, Wee, is located around 5 kilometres from Niwelehu. It is nicknamed that way because it is populated with people from the same history as Niwelehu, who decided to follow the Muslim faith.

=== Natural features ===
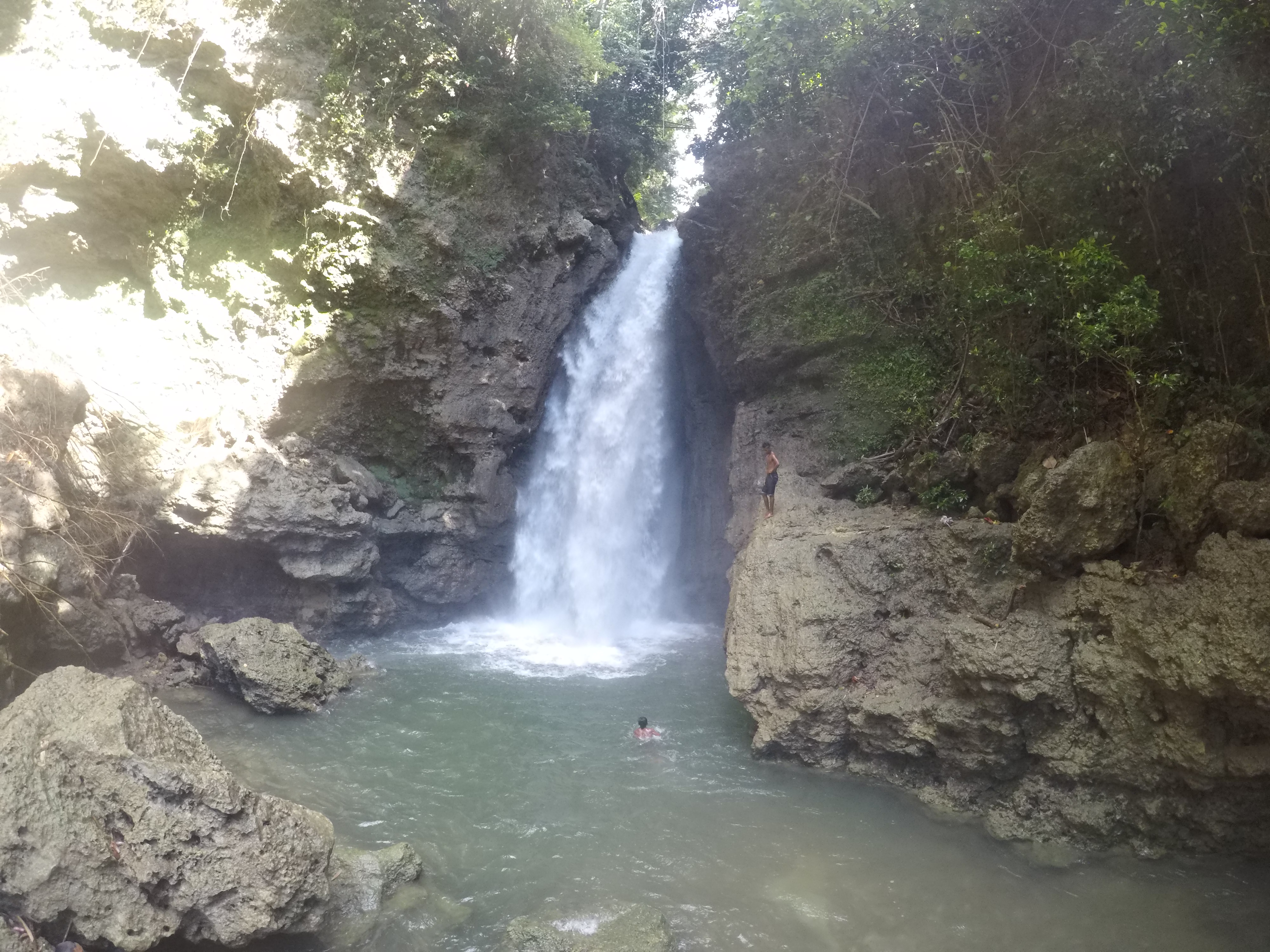
A view of Tona Waterfall

Tona waterfall: 30-meter waterfall. A popular swimming spot for children.

Wairera waterfall: 15-meter waterfall reached by walking through the river, small villages and the forest; it also has caves.

Tomarala beach: beach on the Seram Sea popular for swimming. The village company, Tomarala Sun, is named after it.

Wee beach: a more private beach than Tomarala, with rocks and corals in the water. From time to time, dolphins can be seen jumping here.

== Economy and Infrastructure ==
The economical system in Niwelehu is still based on bartering, although money is also used. With 80% of the working population working as farmers or fishermen, agribusiness is the main source of income for the village.

=== System of Agribusiness ===
The agribusiness system in Niwelehu is separated into three types of commodities that allow harvests all year round. All the fishing is done in the Seram Sea north of Niwelehu, while all the farming is done in the forest south of Niwelehu. The first part of the agribusiness is based on agriculture of chilis, cassava plants and other plants. The second commodity is based on gardening of other crops such as mangoes, coconuts, coffee, cocoa, durian, cloves, and nutmeg. Finally, the farmers also gather products from the forest, such as wood, sago and kenaris (pili nuts). The villagers practice crop rotation.

The harvested crops are exchanged between villagers or sold to businessmen who come bi-monthly to buy the harvest and re-sell for profit in Piru or Ambon.

=== Government Funding ===
The provincial government of Maluku and the federal government based in Jakarta finance every village depending on the size, population, and development needs. According to the medium-term village development programs, Niwelehu is set to receive 5,837,500,000 billion IDR (around 450,000 US $) between 2015 and 2019. The money is divided into categories, some of the main ones being health, education, social-cultural and agriculture.

Government Funding for Niwelehu between 2015 and 2019
No	Department	Total Amount
1	Health	IDR37,500,000
2	Education	IDR1,600,000,000
3	Facilities	IDR3,000,000,000
4	Village Government	IDR225,000,000
5	Economic Enterprise	IDR155,000,000
6	Fishery	IDR260,000,000
7	Socio-Cultural	IDR170,000,000
8	Animal Husbandry	IDR160,000,000
9	Agriculture	IDR230,000,000

Niwelehu depends on government funding in order to develop the infrastructure of the village. Villagers are not legally obligated to pay taxes to the government, as annual incomes are deemed too low.

=== Village Infrastructures ===
In comparison to the neighbouring villages of Niwelehu such as Nikulukan and Nuniali, Niwelehu has more developed infrastructure, including a primary school, clean water pipes, and even volleyball and football field. The construction and maintenance of this infrastructure is made possible by yearly government funding. However, there are still some key things missing or broken, namely a health centre or a clinic, a village office and a clean water well.

== Demographics ==
In the summer of 2017, a village census was conducted, house by house, by the Wonderful Niwelehu team, which is part of the Wonderful Maluku Project, a global entrepreneur program based on an AIESEC Indonesia collaboration with the Citra Kasih Abadi Foundation.

=== Population ===
There are 69 houses in Niwelehu. Some houses host two or even three families, with the house populations being as many as 13 people. The average population per house is 6.3. In total, 433 people live in Niwelehu. Some 54% of the population, so 234 people, are men. The women in the village form 46% of the population (199 people).

=== Age Groups ===
In order to conduct the survey, the age groups were divided into three groups: the children: 0-13 year olds, the teens: 14–19 years olds, and the adults: 20 and above. The census showed that 27% of the population are between the ages of 0 and 13. The 14 to 19 year-old teens formed 13% of the population, while the 20 and above made up the majority of the population, with 59%.

=== Education ===
There are 157 people in the village who are currently enrolled into a school institution. 89% of people aged 0 to 19 are in school and only 20 children are not in school. From the survey, the Wonderful Niwelehu team has found that a majority of those 20 children are not of age to go to school.

=== Work ===
51% of the village population is employed, while 36% are in school. The most popular job in Niwelehu is farmer/fishermen, with 175 people, men and women, working in either jobs. The remaining 20% of the working population are employed as teachers, factory workers, housewives and more.

== Culture ==
The Niwelehu culture is very community based. Because of the small size of the village, all the villagers are very close. Village activities usually revolve around sports, as it is a big part of the culture. Volleyball, football (soccer), and badminton are the most popular sports in the village and they are played everyday on the beach or at the fields.

When it comes to food, the fishing and farming culture makes it very easy and healthy. Most produce that is harvested is cooked for family meals. The main sources of protein are fish and tofu. In addition, all meals usually have rice, sagu or noodles.

As stated in the religion section, the Niwelehu villagers are very observant. Sunday church is a family activity that almost everyone attends, with the exception of people who are farming, working or children who are too young.

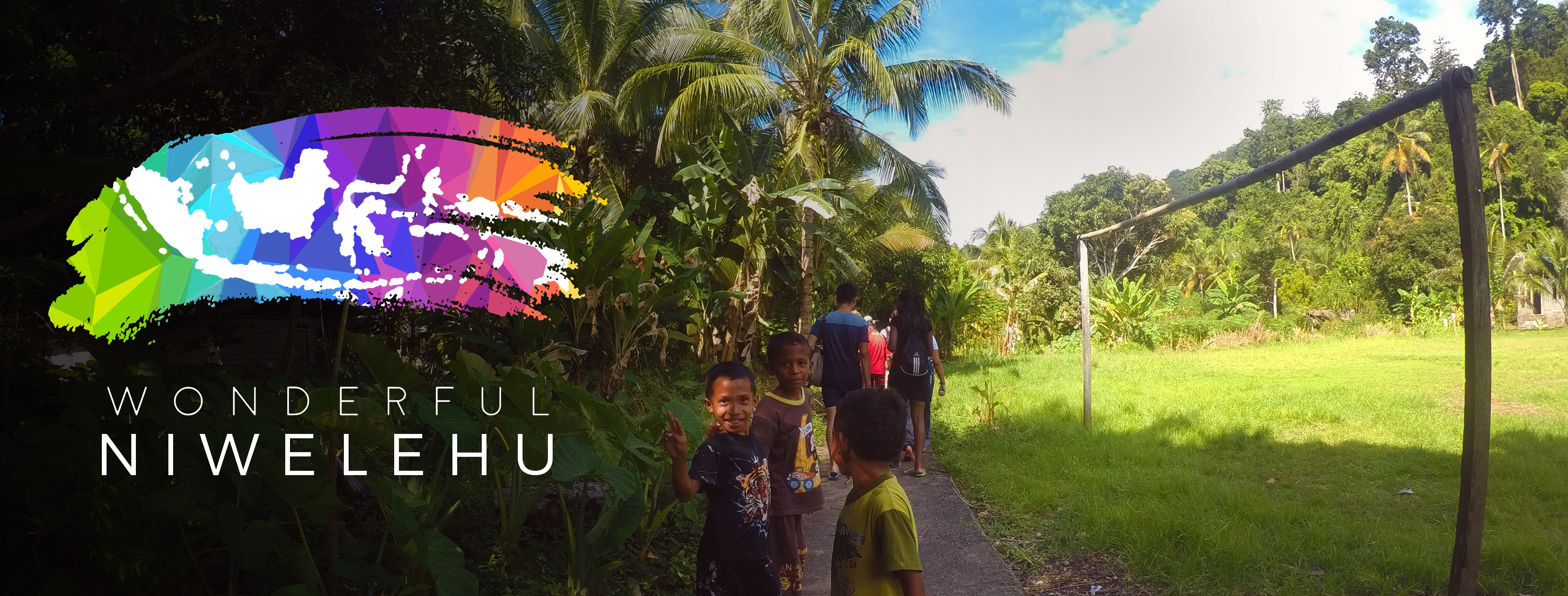
Wonderful Niwelehu

=== Wonderful Niwelehu ===
Based in Niwelehu, the Wonderful Niwelehu team is part of the 2017 Wonderful Maluku Project, a global entrepreneur program based on an AIESEC Indonesia collaboration with the Citra Kasih Abadi Foundation. The vision of the Niwelehu team was to empower potential entrepreneurs to create sustainable solutions for long-term social and economic development through urban development and media exposure in the Maluku tourism sector. The team was made up of nine international students and one project coordinator from Canada, France, Germany, Malta, Morocco, South Africa and Indonesia.

During their three-month stay in Niwelehu, the team worked on business development, project innovation, marketing and communication and journalism. A village brand, Tomarala Sun, was created by the Wonderful Niwelehu team. The team also worked on waste management and compost plans, while making partnerships with businesses.
