= Kulur =

Kulur may refer to:

- Kolowr, Iran
- Kulur, Indonesia
- Kulur, Mangalore, India
