= Invasion of Buru =

- Part of Indonesian invasion of South Maluku
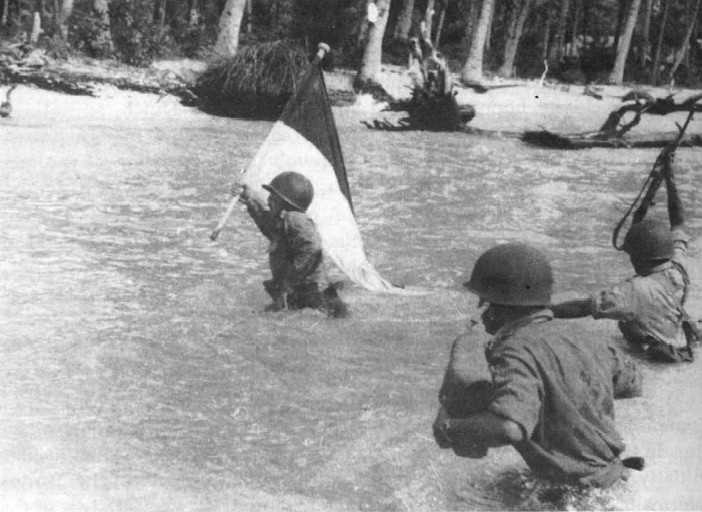
- Ambonese troops from Pattimura Battalion of United States of Indonesia Armed Forces (APRIS) landed in Buru Island in July 1950
Date	14 – 16 July 1950 (2 days)
Location	Buru, Maluku
Result	Indonesian victory
Territorial changes	Indonesian control over Buru restored

Belligerents
Indonesia	Republic of South Maluku

Commanders and leaders
Alexander Evert Kawilarang; Maj. Pelupessy; Maj. Suradji; Maj. Mengho	Daud Lestaluhu (POW)

Units involved
Pattimura Battalion; 352 Battalion; 3 May Battalion	APRMS

Strength
850	150

Casualties and losses
61 killed	19+ killed

The United States of Indonesia invaded the island of Buru, one of the three major islands in the South Moluccas region then under the control of the Republic of South Maluku, on 14 July 1950. Codenamed Operation Night (Indonesian: Operasi Malam) by the Indonesian military, it resulted in a swift occupation of the island within two days. It was one of the first organized combined-arms operations conducted by post-independence Indonesia.

== Background ==
In the aftermath of the Dutch–Indonesian Round Table Conference of 1949, the Netherlands recognised Indonesian independence in exchange for the formation of a federal United States of Indonesia, composed of seven constituent states (negara), including the State of East Indonesia (Negara Indonesia Timur, NIT), which was reorganised from the Great East governorate of the Dutch East Indies. The State of East Indonesia, as an umbrella state constructed to accommodate the plethora of non-Muslim and non-Javanese demographics in the former colony, includes the region (daerah) of South Maluku, which itself was partly constructed to accommodate the sizable pro-Dutch Moluccan Christian population living there, which held a privileged position within colonial society.

In early 1950, the NIT faced increasing pressure from pro-Indonesian nationalist groups which demanded the reintegration of the constituent federal states into the unitary Republic of Indonesia. In an effort to prevent this, former KNIL lieutenant Andi Aziz staged a revolt and took a control of Makassar, NIT's capital, on 5 April 1950. This uprising was supported by South Moluccan individuals within the NIT government, including Minister of Justice Chris Soumokil. When this uprising failed to prevent the dissolution of NIT, Soumokil returned to Ambon and, along with pro-separatist elements from the KNIL, forced the head of the South Maluku government, Johannes Manusama, to declare the independence of South Maluku as an independent republic (RMS) on 25 April 1950. This proclamation was followed by a takeover of government functions in the three main islands of South Maluku: Ambon, Seram, and Buru.

All attempts by the Indonesian government to negotiate a peaceful solution for the crisis from April through June 1950 failed, as the authorities of the RMS insisted on a United Nations-sponsored negotiation instead of an internal process. After the failure of negotiations, the Indonesian government authorised a military expedition (the South Maluku Force Command) to restore Indonesian control of the region, led by Colonel Alexander Evert Kawilarang.

Although the secession of South Maluku was supported by the majority of the local Christian political elite and Ambonese soldiers, the response in Buru (which in 1950 had a population of around 25,000 people) towards secession was mixed. On 28 April, soon after RMS declared independence, Bond Radjapatih, an association of traditional rulers (rajas) of Buru declared its rejection of RMS secession and affirmed its loyalty to the Indonesian government.

== Preparations ==
Topographic map of Buru

The invasion of Buru was intended to blockade and isolate the RMS leadership in Ambon. On the lead-up to the invasion, the Indonesian Navy bombarded Namlea, the administrative centre of Buru Island, the westernmost major island under RMS control, as a launchpad for future operations to reclaim Seram and Ambon.

On 13 July 1950, the South Maluku Force Command was authorised to launch an invasion against Buru. The United States of Indonesia Armed Forces (APRIS), numbering at 850 soldiers, were organised under the following units:

- Indonesian Army:
  - Pattimura Battalion: Major Pelupessy
  - Battalion 352: Major Suradji
  - 3 May Battalion: Major Mengho
- Indonesian Navy:
  - RI Patti Unus
  - RI Hang Tuah
  - RI Banteng

The defending forces, organised under the RMS Armed Forces (Angkatan Perang RMS, APRMS) was significantly smaller than the invading forces, only composed of the small local garrison of 150 KNIL soldiers stationed at Namlea (as most APRMS forces were concentrated on the island of Ambon) under the command of KNIL Sergeant Daud Lestaluhu.

== Battle ==
Under the cover of naval artillery from the Patti Unus, the APRIS forces landed unopposed at Lala, a village 5 kilometres (3 miles) north of Namlea, at 09.30 hours, 14 July 1950. The first battalion to land, the Pattimura Battalion, advanced south towards the town of Namlea. The first engagement against APRMS defenders occurred at Milestone 4 north of Namlea. Due to the preparedness of APRMS forces which fired towards the APRIS advancing in open terrain, APRIS forces lost three men from hostile fire.

Under heavy APRMS fire, two APRIS platoons conducted a pincer manoeuvre against APRMS defenders at Milestone 4, managing to dislodge the defenders and advance into Namlea town by afternoon of 14 July.

At 01.00 hours, 15 July, APRMS forces under the command of Sergeant Daud Lestaluhu advanced into Namlea town and engaged an APRIS company. During the ensuing firefight, Lestaluhu was captured by APRIS forces and taken prisoner. Lestaluhu was taken aboard the Patti Unus to meet Colonel Alex Kawilarang to negotiate a surrender. Lesteluhu acknowledged that he had fallen victim to RMS "provocateurs" and agreed to provide his service to APRIS.

Although they had lost their commander, throughout 15 July APRMS forces still put up fierce resistance inside Namlea town, while APRIS forces had secured positions along the coast and on the hills surrounding Namlea. At 05.30 hours, 16 July, APRIS forces forced their way into Namlea town and defeated the APRMS defenders, while three Higgins boats commandeered by APRMS soldiers fled the harbour. The Patti Unus sunk two and captured one. By 07.00 hours, 16 July, Namlea was secured by APRIS forces.

== Aftermath ==
The invasion of Buru was the first engagement fought in the Indonesian war against the RMS. In total, 61 Indonesian soldiers were killed: 44 from the Pattimura Battalion, 3 from the 3 May Battalion, and 14 from Battalion 352. Surviving APRMS forces took refuge in the mountains of Buru Island, leaving behind 19 dead.

The Indonesian convoy left Buru towards Seram on 18 July, leaving behind the Pattimura Battalion under the command of Major Pelupessy to garrison the island.
