= Luhu, Indonesia =

Luhu
- Town
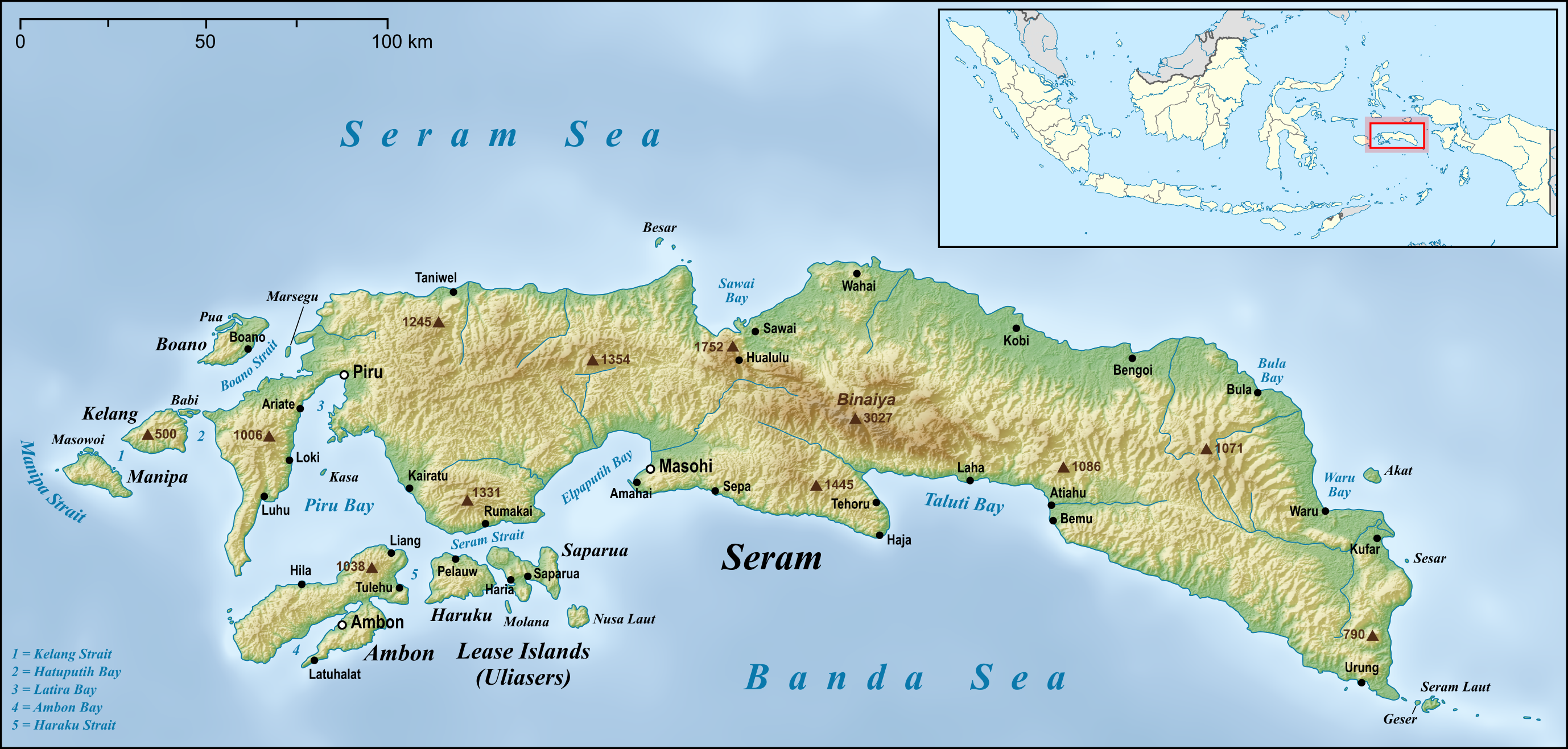
- Location in Seram Island
- Coordinates: 3°27′26″S 127°57′13″E
- Country: Indonesia
- Province: Maluku
- Regency: West Seram

Population (mid 2024 estimate)
  - Total: 26,709
- Time zone: UTC+8 (WITA)

Luhu is a small town on the southwestern coast of the Indonesian island of Seram. It lies near the end of the Huamual Peninsula, between Kulur and Urieng on the tip. Luhu is noted for its Makassan traders, exporting cloves from the port. The clove industry took off in the first half of the 17th century, at the time when Luhu was a vassal of Tidore. The Dutch secured a military post at Luhu. The Luhu language is spoken in the vicinity.
