= BZN (disambiguation) =

BZN is a Dutch pop band.

BZN, Bzn, or bzn may also refer to:

- Brezinaite, a rare mineral composed of chromium and sulfur
- Bagnan railway station, a train station in Bagnan, West Bengal, India
- the ISO 639 code for the Boano language (Maluku), a language spoken in Boano island, Indonesia
- the IATA and FAA codes for Bozeman Yellowstone International Airport, an airport in Belgrade, Montana, U.S.
- the postal code for Balzan, Malta
