= Morotai paradise kingfisher =

- Tanysiptera doris doris

Scientific classification
- Kingdom: Animalia
- Phylum: Chordata
- Class: Aves
- Order: Coraciiformes
- Family: Alcedinidae
- Subfamily: Halcyoninae
- Genus: Tanysiptera
- Species: T. doris

Binomial name
- Tanysiptera doris Wallace, 1862

Synonyms
- Tanysiptera galatea doris

Species of bird

The Morotai paradise kingfisher (Tanysiptera doris) is a species of bird in the family Alcedinidae. It is found only on Morotai Island and Rao Island in Indonesia. It was described by Alfred Russel Wallace in 1862. This species was formerly considered to be conspecific with the Papuan paradise kingfisher (Tanysiptera galatea).

== Etymology ==
The specific epithet doris is from Doris, a god in Greek mythology. The subspecies name emiliae is named after Emily Eliza Sharpe née Burrows, the wife of Richard Bowdler Sharpe.

== Taxonomy and systematics ==
This species was formerly considered a subspecies of the common paradise kingfisher but was separated from it along with four other species based on an examination of the calls of the members of the galatea complex.

Two subspecies are recognised-

- Tanysiptera doris doris Wallace, 1862 - Morotai Island
- Tanysiptera doris emiliae Sharpe, 1871 - Rao Island

This species is divergent vocally vocally from the Halmahera paradise kingfisher. The subspecies emiliae is tentatively assigned to doris because of the lack of vocal evidence. However, during the Last Glacial Maximum, the islands of Morotai and Rau formed a palaeo-island. Moreover, the islands of Morotai and Halmahera, which are 17 km apart, never shared a land connection.

== Description ==
Illustration of Tanysiptera doris emiliae in A Monograph of the Alcedinidae by Richard Bowdler Sharpe

The male has a blue crown, dark blue upperparts and a white back and rump. The bill is red, legs and feet brownish-grey to yellowish-brown and outer tail bluish white. The female is similar to the male but smaller.

The juvenile has brown upperparts, yellowish underparts and a brown bill.

Subspecies doris is differentiated from the members of the galatea complex because of its fully white upper back. Subspecies emiliae is similar to subspecies doris, but the crown is silvery green-blue and is more prominently crested, and it has a white tail base.

== Habits ==
This species is the second paradise kingfisher species which has been recorded to exhibit cooperative breeding after the buff-breasted paradise kingfisher, as up to three birds were found to be visiting the nest with food in a span of 4 hours. This species builds its nests in arboreal termitaria about 7-8 m off the ground.

Its general habitat is monsoon and lowland forest.
