= Boano language =

Boano language may refer to:

- Boano language (Sulawesi) (Bolano)
- Boano language (Maluku)
