= Common paradise kingfisher =

In 2026 the common paradise kingfisher (Tanysiptera galatea) was split into six species:

- Papuan paradise kingfisher (Tanysiptera galatea)
- Morotai paradise kingfisher (Tanysiptera doris)
- Halmahera paradise kingfisher (Tanysiptera margarethae)
- Obi paradise kingfisher (Tanysiptera obiensis)
- Amboyna paradise kingfisher (Tanysiptera nais)
- Rossel paradise kingfisher (Tanysiptera rosseliana)
