= Loki, Indonesia =

Loki
- Town
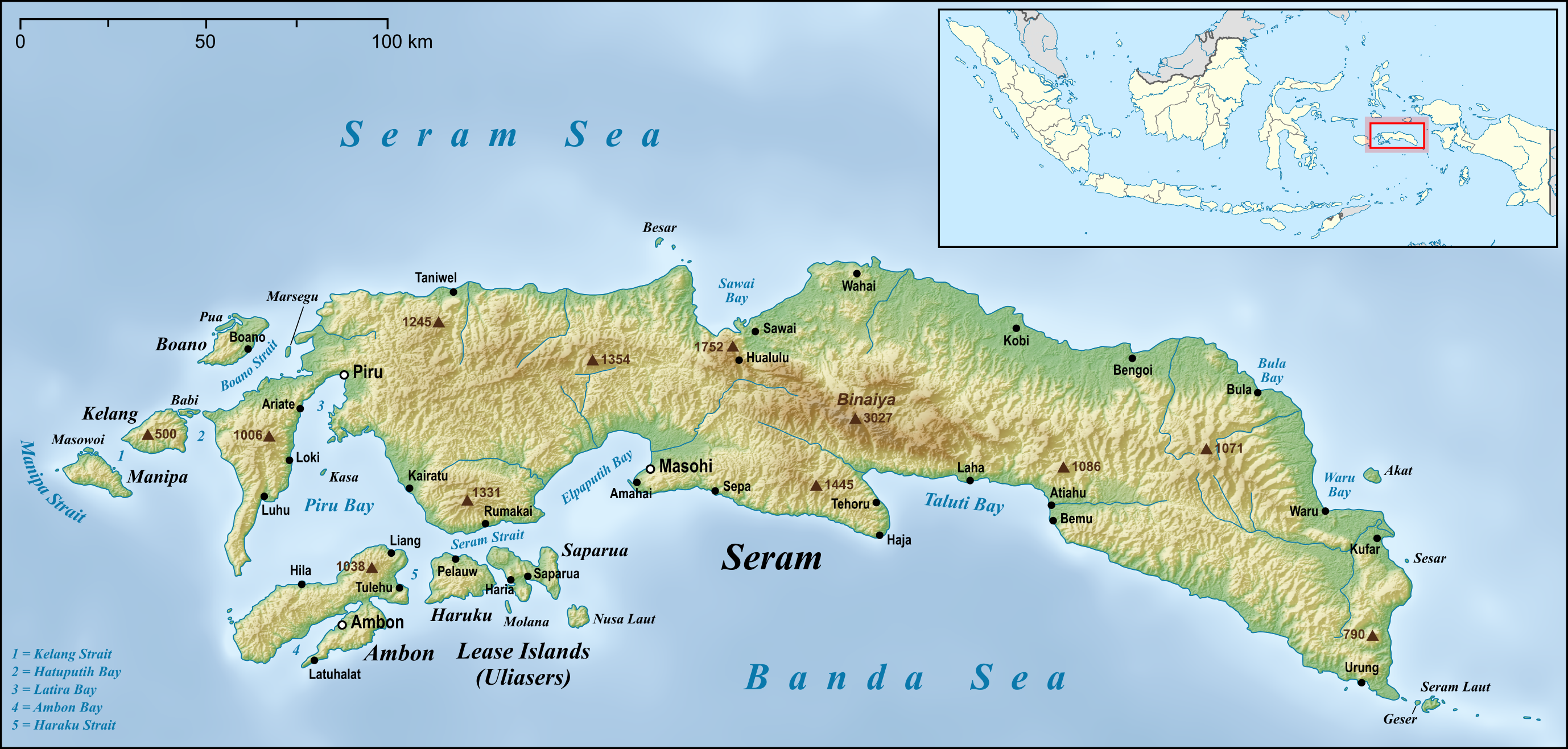
- Location in Seram Island
- Coordinates: 3°18′32″S 128°3′32″E
- Country: Indonesia
- Province: Maluku
- Regency: West Seram
- Time zone: UTC+8 (WITA)

Loki is a small town on the southwestern coast of the Indonesian island of Seram, situated between the towns of Kulur and Ariate. On 21–22 August 1999 there was violent conflict in the area and other settlements such as Piru, Ariate, Laala and Wailissa, which resulted in 12 deaths in total on the island.
