= Kelang =

Island in Maluku, Indonesia

Coordinates: 3°12′S 127°44′E

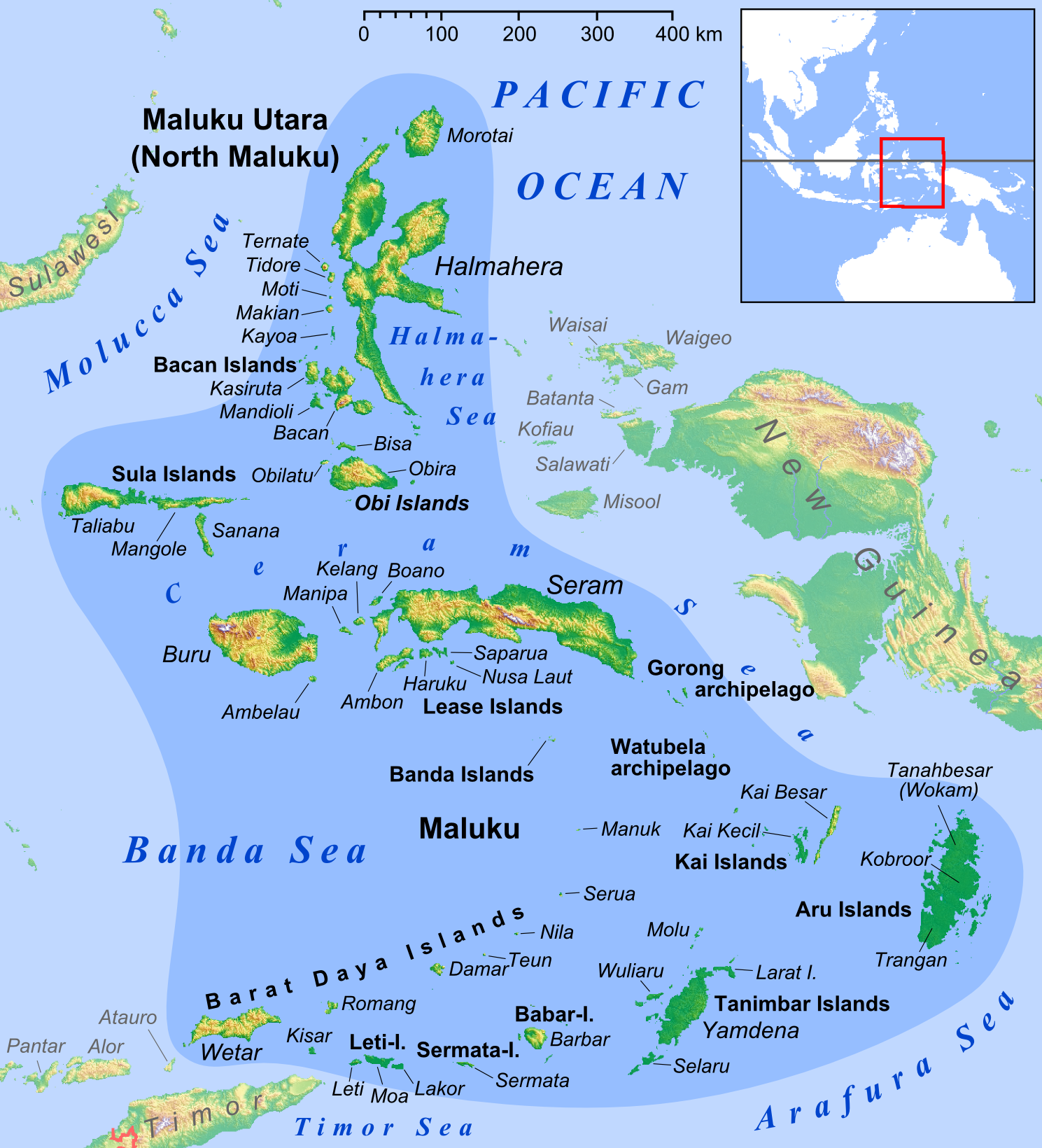

Geography
- Location: South East Asia
- Archipelago: Maluku Islands
- Highest elevation: 828 m (2717 ft)
- Highest point: Tonu

Administration
- Indonesia

Demographics
- Population: 12,585 (mid 2022 estimate)

Kelang Island is an island in West Seram Regency, Maluku Province, Indonesia. It is a mountainous island located off the western tip of Seram Island, just east of Manipa. Sole, located on the northeastern side, and Tahalupu on the western side are the two principal villages. Tonu Jaya is a third village in the southeast of the island. Mount Tonu, the highest point in the island, is an old volcano.

Babi Island is a 6 km long island located between Kelang and Seram. It is a relatively low island close off Kelang's northeastern side, separated from Kelang and Seram by narrow straits.

The inhabitants of Kelang speak the Luhu language, as well as Indonesian and Ambonese Malay.
