= Dantje Jacob Samson =

- Samson in unknown year

Commander of the Armed Forces of the Republic of South Maluku
- In office 9 May 1950 – 30 June 1951
- Preceded by: Office established
- Succeeded by: ?

Personal details
- Born: 1 January 1908 Magelang, Dutch East Indies
- Died: Unknown

Military service
- Allegiance: Dutch East Indies (?-1950); Republic of South Maluku (1950 - 1951)
- Branch/service: Royal Netherlands East Indies Army; Armed Forces of the Republic of South Maluku
- Rank: Sergeant
- Battles/wars: Indonesian National Revolution; Indonesian invasion of South Maluku

Dantje Jacob Samson (1 January 1908 – ?) was a military figure who served in the Royal Netherlands East Indies Army (KNIL) and the Armed Forces of the Republic of South Maluku (APRMS). While serving the RMS, he was appointed Commander of the APRMS.

== Biography ==
Samson was born in Magelang on 1 January 1908. He completed his education at the ELS in Ambon. He then continued his education at MULO, where he studied up to the second grade. After finishing school, he worked as a clerk in the administrative department of the Purworejo Military Hospital. In 1926, the Dutch East Indies government granted him European status.

=== KNIL Career ===
Samson joined the KNIL in an unknown year. On 7 October 1924, he became a KNIL infantry soldier and was stationed in Yogyakarta. He subsequently attended the Kaderschool in Magelang. After completing his studies at the Kaderschool, he was promoted to corporal and stationed in Jatinegara.

In 1928, Samson was deployed to Aceh. He was later stationed in Magelang, where he was promoted to sergeant. In 1936, he was stationed at the Boven Digoel concentration camp for a year, where he was tasked with supervising prisoners. He then moved to Bandung. He subsequently served in Malang. In 1941, he became a submachine gun operator in Singosari.

After Japan successfully defeated the Dutch, Japanese forces captured Samson in Probolinggo in 1942. He was subsequently transferred to Papua. Following Japan's defeat, he was appointed as an instructor with Company 142. He later became an MP instructor in Ambon. He also served with Westerling's forces. On 17 January 1950, Samson and his troops, known as the Green Berets, arrived in Ambon. This unit was among the first KNIL forces to arrive in Ambon. He was one of the four former KNIL sergeants who wielded influence in Ambon, alongside Pattiwel, Kastanja, and Pieters.

=== Republic of South Maluku ===
On 9 May 1950, the Armed Forces of the Republic of South Maluku (ARMPS) was established, and he was appointed its commander. He later persuaded the commander of the KNIL Ambon Garrison, M. Nanlohy, to join the ARMPS, but Nanlohy refused, choosing to remain loyal to the Netherlands. When the Indonesian National Armed Forces (TNI) launched an attack on Rutong, Samson, who was not far from there, was forced to flee with his guards. He surrendered on 30 June 1951.

Samson's trial began at the Yogyakarta Military Court on 1 March 1955. During the hearing on 23 March 1955, he denied the charges and said the Republic of South Maluku (RMS) was legitimate because its people had proclaimed it under their right to self-determination. He also acknowledged that ARMPS had committed acts of brutality, but he said that he had not ordered them. On 25 May 1955, military prosecutor Sunarto requested a 15-year prison sentence for Samson. On 8 June 1955, the judge of the Yogyakarta Military Court, Salatun, sentenced Samson to 10 years in prison. Following the sentencing, he applied for a pardon from the Yogyakarta Military Court. In July 1956, he was reportedly imprisoned in Surabaya.

Samson was released in an unknown year. He was offered the opportunity to join the Indonesian National Armed Forces (TNI), but he declined the offer. After his release, Samson worked at the Gumilang Shipyard Company in Jakarta in 1963. In 1978, he was reportedly living in Jakarta and was interviewed by Richard Chauvel.

=== Personal life ===
Samson married Dete Hendrika. In 1934, they had a son named Johny Pieter. A year after Johny's birth, the couple had another son, Rudy, who was born on 4 July. On 15 May 1936, the couple had a daughter whom they named Cornelia Maria Hendrika.

== Bibliographies ==
- Chauvel, Richard (1990). Nationalists, Soldiers and Separatists: The Ambonese Islands from Colonialism to Revolt, 1880-1950. Leiden: KITLV Press. ISBN 9789004253957.
- Matanasi, Petrik (2015). RMS; Republik Militer (Para) Sersan. Sleman: Indie Book Corner.
