= Manipa language =

Austronesian language spoken in Maluku, Indonesia

Manipa
- Soow Huhelia
- Native to: Indonesia (Maluku Islands)
- Region: Manipa Island, west of Seram
- Native speakers: (1,500 cited 1981)
- Language family: Austronesian: Malayo-Polynesian (MP); Central–Eastern MP; Central Maluku ?; East Central Maluku; Seram ?; Nunusaku; Piru Bay; West; Hoamoal; Manipa
- Dialects: Masawoy; Tomalehu; Tuniwara

Language codes
- ISO 639-3: mqp
- Glottolog: mani1297

Manipa is an Austronesian language of eastern Indonesia. It is primarily spoken in the island of Manipa, which is located between Buru island and Seram island in the province of Maluku.
