= Boano =

Island in Maluku, Indonesia

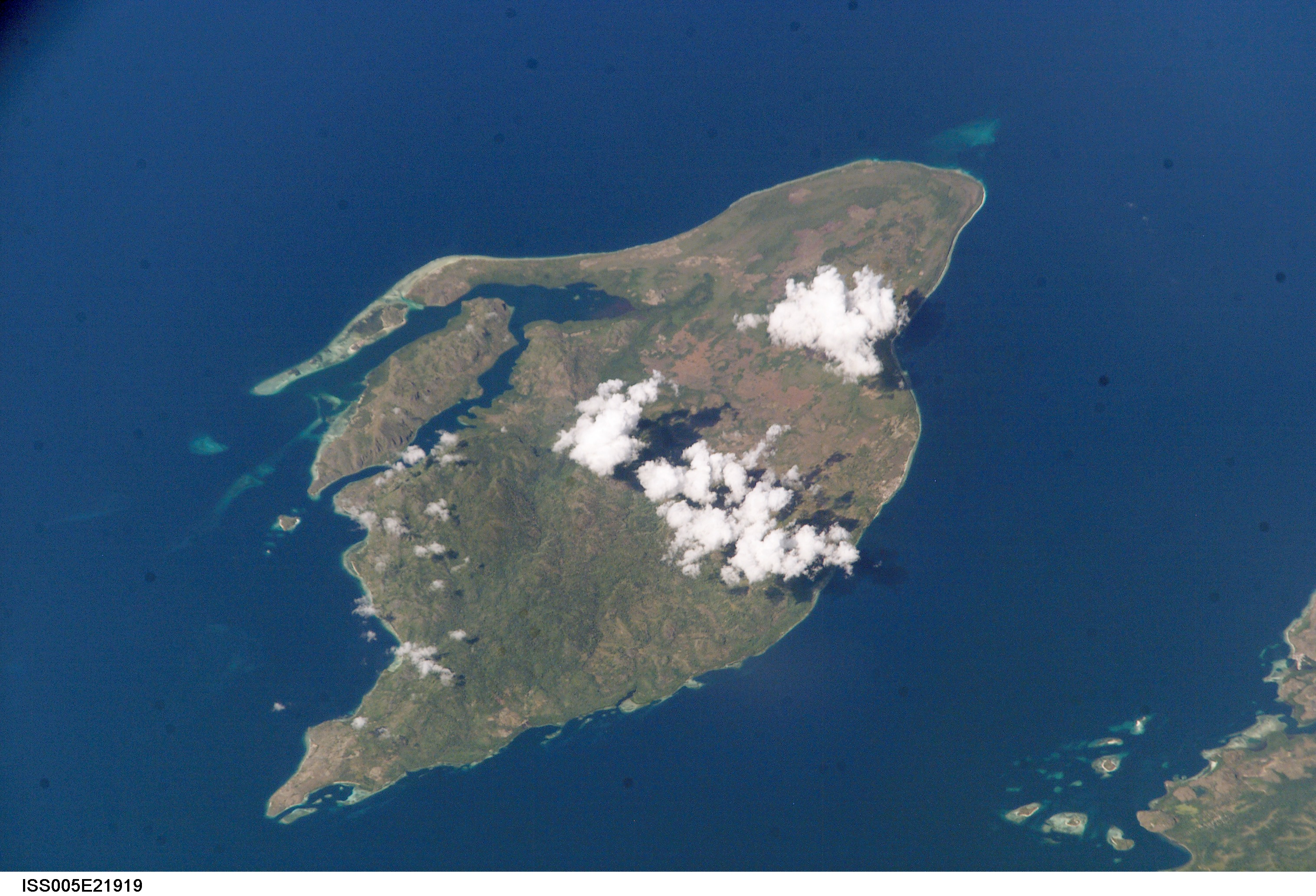
- Buano Island from the ISS space station

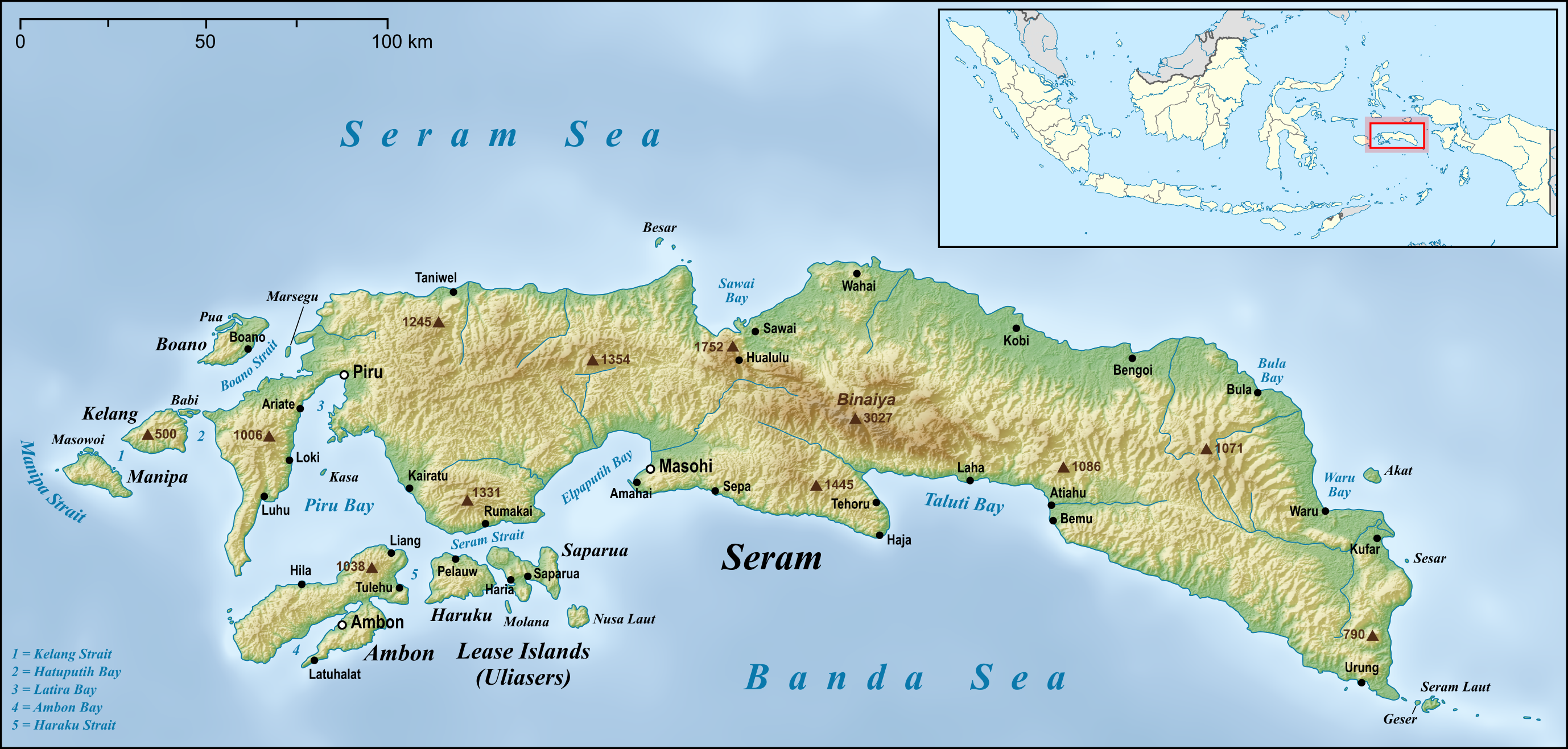

- Location within Indonesia

Geography
- Location: Seram Sea
- Coordinates: 2°59′S 127°55′E
- Archipelago: Maluku Islands
- Area: 134 km^{2} (52 sq mi)
- Highest elevation: 624 m (2047 ft)

Administration
- Indonesia
- Province: Maluku
- Regency: West Seram Regency

Demographics
- Population: 10028 (2020 Census)
- Pop. density: 74.8/km^{2} (193.7/sq mi)
- Languages: Ambonese Malay, Boano, Indonesian, Luhu

Additional information
- Time zone: IEST (UTC+09:00)

Buano Island (formerly called "Boano") is an island in West Seram Regency, Maluku Province, Indonesia. It is located off the northern coast of the Huamual Peninsula at the western end of Seram Island, across the Boano Strait (Selat Buano). The inhabitants speak the Buano and Luhu languages, as well as Indonesian and Ambonese Malay.

The smaller Pua Island (Pulau Pua), highest point 403 metres, is located close off Buano's northwestern tip, while the even smaller (and interlinked by a causeway) Kasuari (Pulau Kasuari) and Niene (Pulau Niene) islands to the north of Pua Island contain much of the district population.

== Geography ==
Buano is mostly flat in the east and north, rising to hills in the west and south. The highest point on Buano is Gunung Tahun in the west of the island, with an altitude of 606 metres (1,988 ft). In the northwest, is the long and narrow Pua Island, separated from Buano by the narrow Valentine Strait, which is interspersed with coral reefs in many places.

Buano has a tropical rainforest climate (Köppen climate classification Af). The island is divided into two villages (desa), whose border is disputed. At the 2020 Census, the population in South Buano was 1,741 while in North Buano (including Pua Island) was 8,287 inhabitants. The main access to the island is by sea.

== History ==
Buano is mentioned by Dutch naturalist and author François Valentijn, in his book Beschryvinge van Amboina in 1724 as Bunoa, Boan, Boano, and Bonnoa, along with a listing of the names of various villages and their leaders. At that time, he estimated the island to have been inhabited by 1,200 people most of whom were subsistence farmers. Valentijn also mentioned the peace talks between Herman van Speult of the Dutch East India Company (VOC) and a local ruler named Sengadji in 1619.

The Huamual Peninsula region in western Seram was a center of the spice trade since before the 17th century's and Buano Island had the advantage of being a safe harbor during the west monsoon season. In the 17th century, Buano Island and the Huamual Peninsula were subject to the Sultanate of Ternate. Islam also spread in this area at that time. Today, Islam tends to dominate the northern part of Buano while Protestant Christianity is concentrated in the south. When the VOC consolidated its monopoly on the spice trade in Maluku, there were several rebellions, including the Huamual War which also involved Buano in 1639. The VOC succeeded in winning the war and in 1656, and subsequently carried out forced displacement of residents to various regions in western Seram in an effort to quell further rebellion. Many inhabitants of Buano were forcibly relocated to Manipa Island. In 1675, Ternate made a treaty with the VOC, withdrawing its claims against the Ambon and surrounding areas including Buano. Until 1917, Buano was listed as an area of the West Seram Onderafdeling, Afdeling Seram, Governorate of Ambon.

The island did not receive significant attention in the later stage of Dutch colonization. After the capture of the Netherlands East Indies by Japan during World War II in 1942, Buano - together with the rest of the Moluccas - was assigned to the zone of occupation of the Japanese 2nd Fleet. The occupation formally ended in August 1945; however, the newly-proclaimed Republic of Indonesia was unable to establish its power in such a remote region, and in early 1946 the Netherlands regained control of Buano without resistance. A few months later, Buano (along with all the Moluccas, Sulawesi and the Lesser Sunda Islands) was included in the quasi-independent State of East Indonesia in December 1949. The decision to incorporate East Indonesia into the Republic of Indonesia in April 1950 was opposed by many inhabitants, leading to the proclamation of the Republic of South Moluccas, which included Buano. The succession was crushed by the Indonesian military by the end of 1950 and Buano was proclaimed part of the Republic of Indonesia.

In 1983, sectarian rioting broke out when several North Buano residents attacked South Buano. Several people were killed and a number of buildings in South Buano were burned. In 1999 during the Maluku sectarian conflict, further violence erupted.
