= Ariate =

- Town
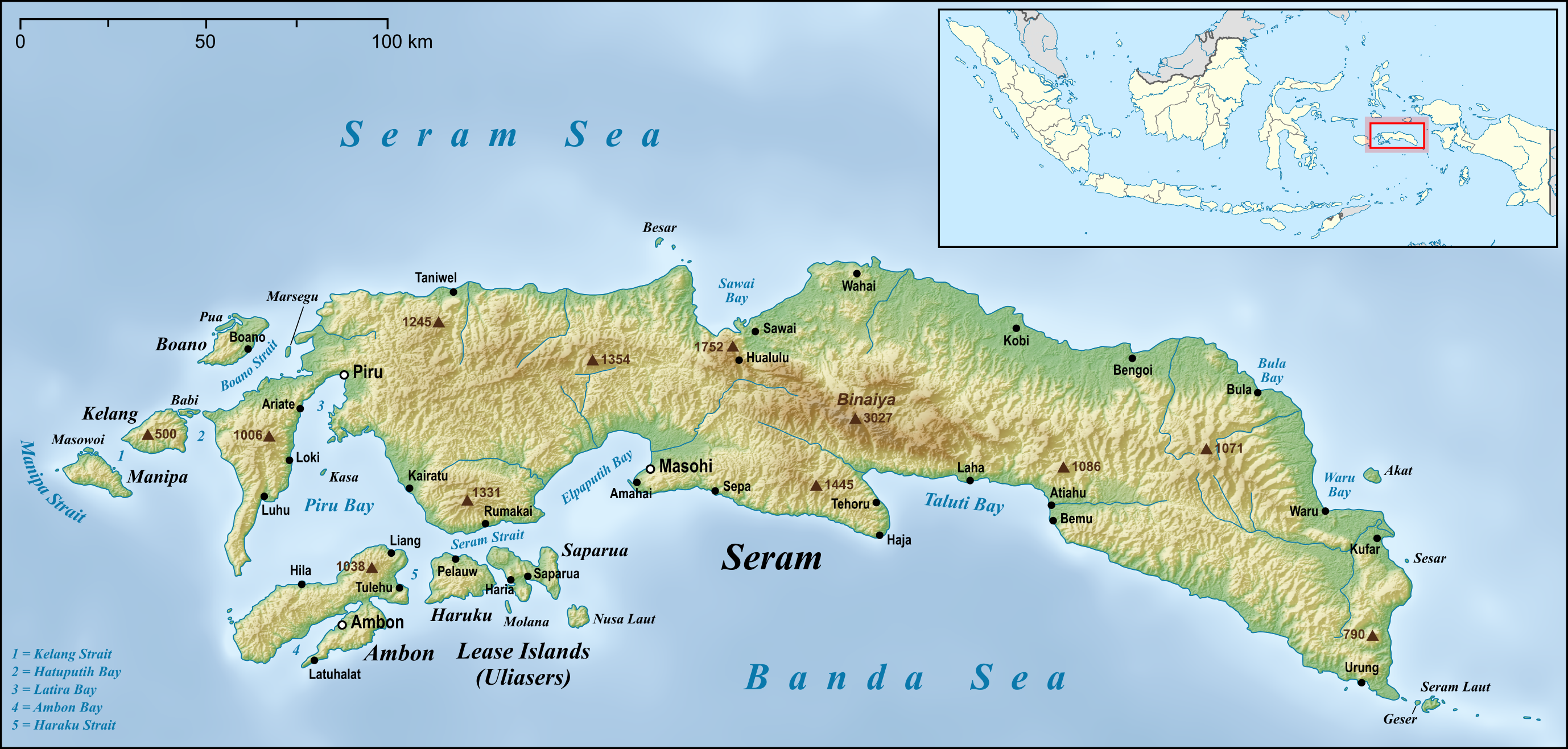
- Location in Seram Island
- Coordinates: 3°11′2″S 128°4′28″E
- Country: Indonesia
- Province: Maluku
- Regency: West Seram
- Time zone: UTC+8 (WITA)

Ariate is a small town on the southwestern coast of the Indonesian island of Seram. On 21–22 August 1999 there was violent conflict in the area and other settlements such as Piru, Loki, Laala and Wailissa, which resulted in 12 deaths in total on the island. Police failed to reach the town on time, due to mobs who "set up roadblocks and fired shots at the reinforcements sent in from Salahutu sub-district town of Masohi".
