= Rossel paradise kingfisher =

Scientific classification
- Kingdom: Animalia
- Phylum: Chordata
- Class: Aves
- Order: Coraciiformes
- Family: Alcedinidae
- Subfamily: Halcyoninae
- Genus: Tanysiptera
- Species: T. rosseliana

Binomial name
- Tanysiptera rosseliana Tristram, 1889

Synonyms
- Tanysiptera galatea rosseliana

Species of bird

The Rossel paradise kingfisher (Tanysiptera rosseliana) is a species of bird in the family Alcedinidae. It is found only on Rossel Island in the Louisiade Archipelago of Papua New Guinea. It was described by Henry Baker Tristram in 1889. It is monotypic.

== Taxonomy and systematics ==
This species was formerly considered a subspecies of the common paradise kingfisher but was separated from it along with four other species based on an examination of the calls of the members of the galatea complex.

== Description ==
This species is similar to the subspecies meyeri of the common paradise kingfisher, but it is separated from it because of its deeper purple-blue upperparts and an almost completely white tail.

It differs from the subspecies minor by having a rich dark blue, not turquoise, crown; a dark blue, not blackish, cheek; and a black, not whitish, underwing.

== Habits ==
This species has a strikingly different call from the other members of the galatea complex. This species has a short introductory note, immediately followed by a rapid trill. Its breeding behaviours are unknown.

== Distribution and habitat ==
This species is found only on Rossel Island, however, it is absent from the Trobriand Islands, the D'Entrecasteaux Islands and the rest of the Louisiade Archipelago. Rossel island is 400 km away from the nearest Tanysiptera population. This isolation is likely to restrict the gene flow between this species and its Papuan counterparts.

This species inhabits the forest interior and is common in lowland forest from 1-300 metres.
