= Kairatu =

- Kecamatan and town
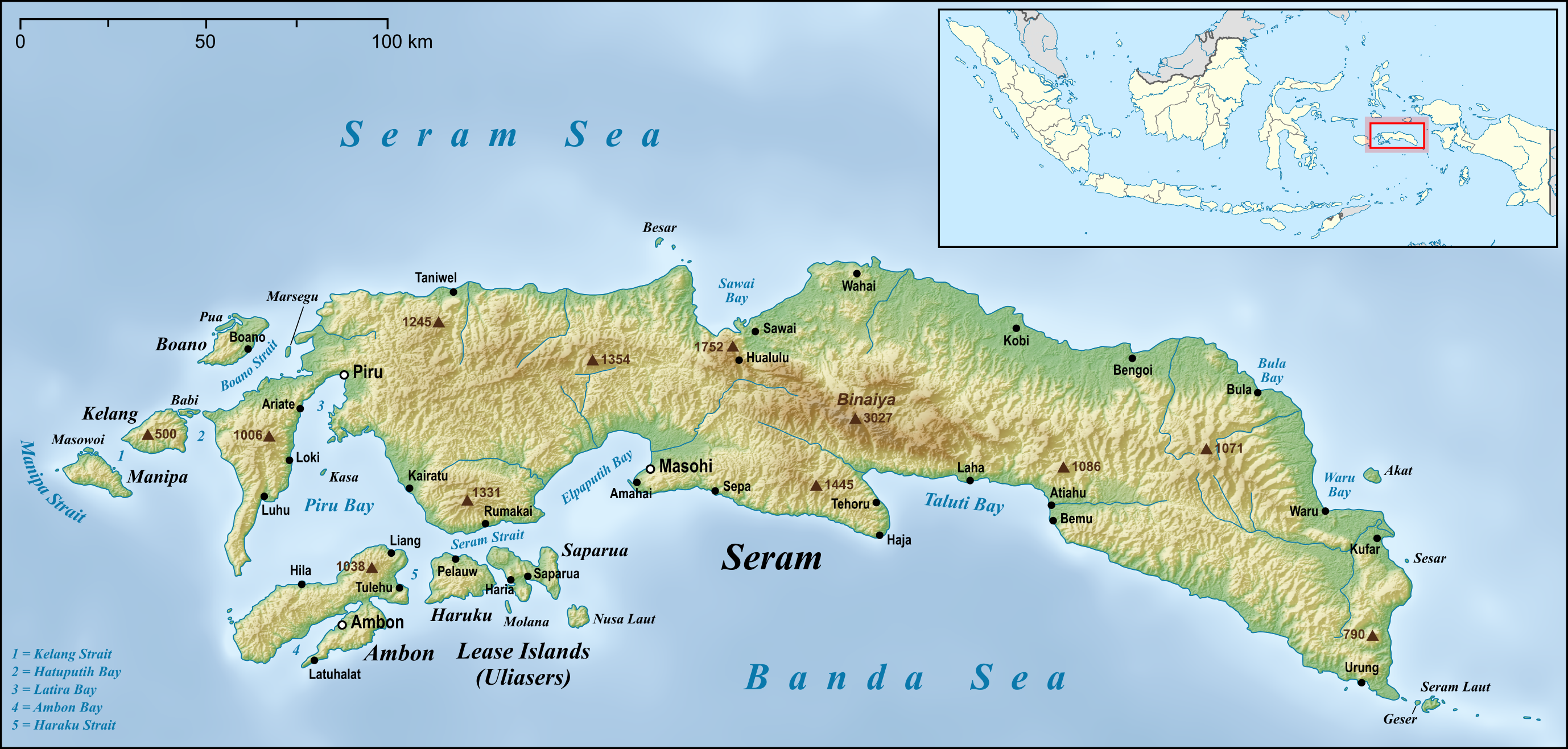
- Location in Seram Island
- Coordinates: 3°12′55″S 128°10′34″E
- Country: Indonesia
- Province: Maluku
- Regency: West Seram

Area
  - Total: 329.65 km^{2} (127.28 sq mi)

Population (2020 Census)
  - Total: 26,717
- Time zone: UTC+8 (WITA)

Kairatu is a small town and district (kecamatan) on the southwestern coast of the Indonesian island of Seram. It is part of West Seram Regency. According to the 2010 census, the district had a population of 54,866 people, but the district has subsequently been split and the reduced area (now 329.65 km^{2}) had 27,040 inhabitants at the 2020 Census, while the official estimate as at mid 2023 was 26,717. The town itself had 10,266 inhabitants in mid 2022.
