= Obi paradise kingfisher =

Scientific classification
- Kingdom: Animalia
- Phylum: Chordata
- Class: Aves
- Order: Coraciiformes
- Family: Alcedinidae
- Subfamily: Halcyoninae
- Genus: Tanysiptera
- Species: T. obiensis

Binomial name
- Tanysiptera obiensis Salvadori, 1877

Synonyms
- Tanysiptera galatea obiensis

Species of bird

The Obi paradise kingfisher (Tanysiptera obiensis) is a species of bird in the family Alcedinidae. It is found on Obi, Obilatu and Bisa Islands in Indonesia. It was described by Tommaso Salvadori in 1877. It is monotypic.

== Taxonomy and systematics ==
This species was formerly considered a subspecies of the common paradise kingfisher but was separated from it along with four other species based on an examination of the calls of the members of the galatea complex.

It is less distinct from T. galatea than other species of the complex, however, its differentiation is not surprising considering the Obi island group is the most isolated island group among the Moluccas. The Obi island group is separated from Bacan, where the nearest population of Tanysiptera resides, by about 30 km of open water.

== Description ==
This species is similar to the common paradise kingfisher, but it is larger, the crown and lesser wing-coverts are bright cobalt-blue, and the rump feathers are white with blue edges.

== Habits ==
This species is the most vocally divergent of all the members of the galatea complex. It is the only member of the complex to have a descending trill.
