= Taniwel =

- Kecamatan and village
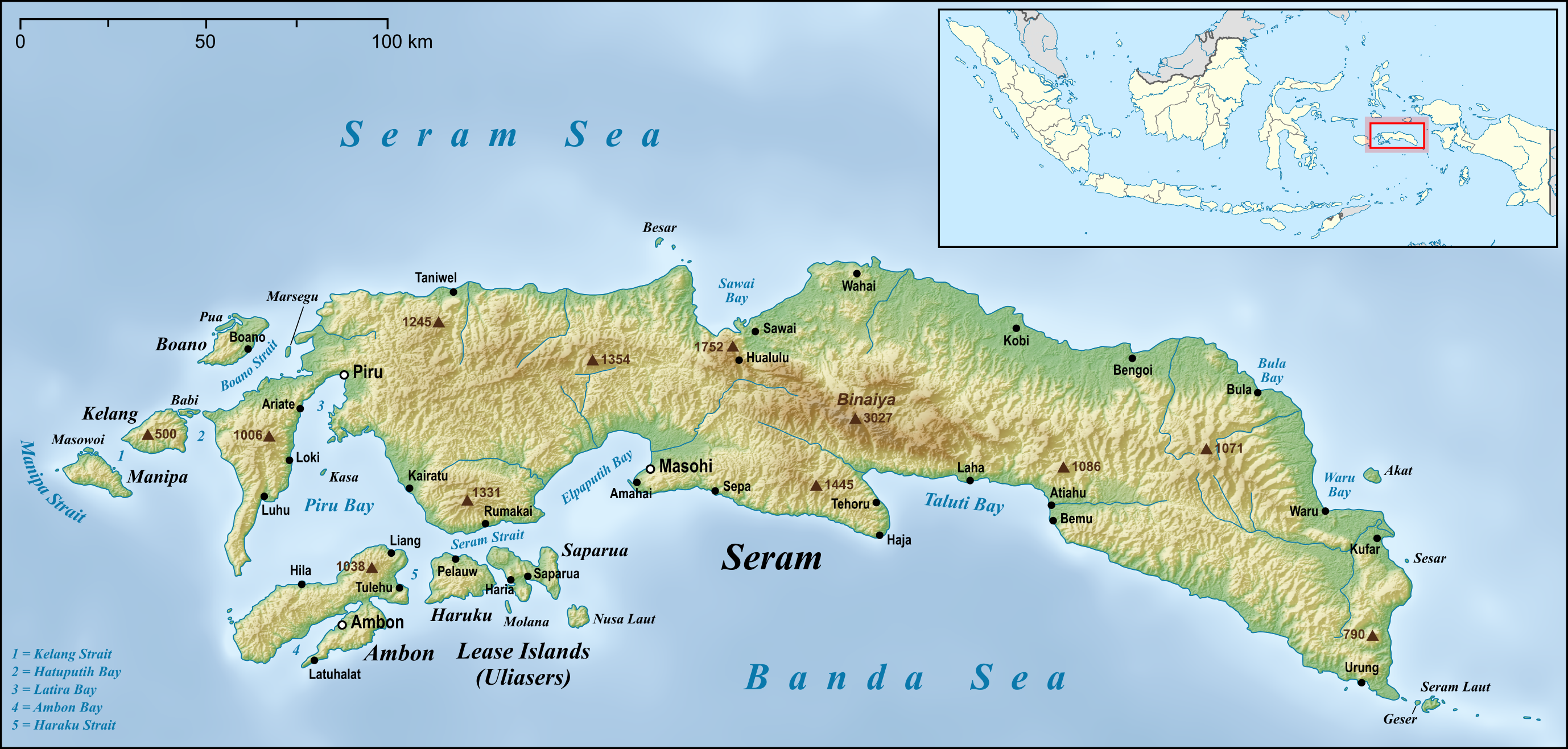
- Location in Seram Island
- Coordinates: 2°50′54″S 128°26′24″E
- Country: Indonesia
- Province: Maluku
- Regency: West Seram
- Time zone: UTC+8 (WITA)

Taniwel is a village and kecamatan on the northwestern coast of the Indonesian island of Seram.

== Geography ==
The Sapalewa River flows underground between the villages of Taniwel and Buria through the mountains of Hatu Toi Siwa, currently explored for about 3.7 kilometers. It is one of the largest underground rivers of the planet.

== See also ==
- Niwelehu: village in Taniwel
