= West Seram Regency =

Regency in Maluku, Indonesia

West Seram Regency Kabupaten Seram Bagian Barat
- Regency
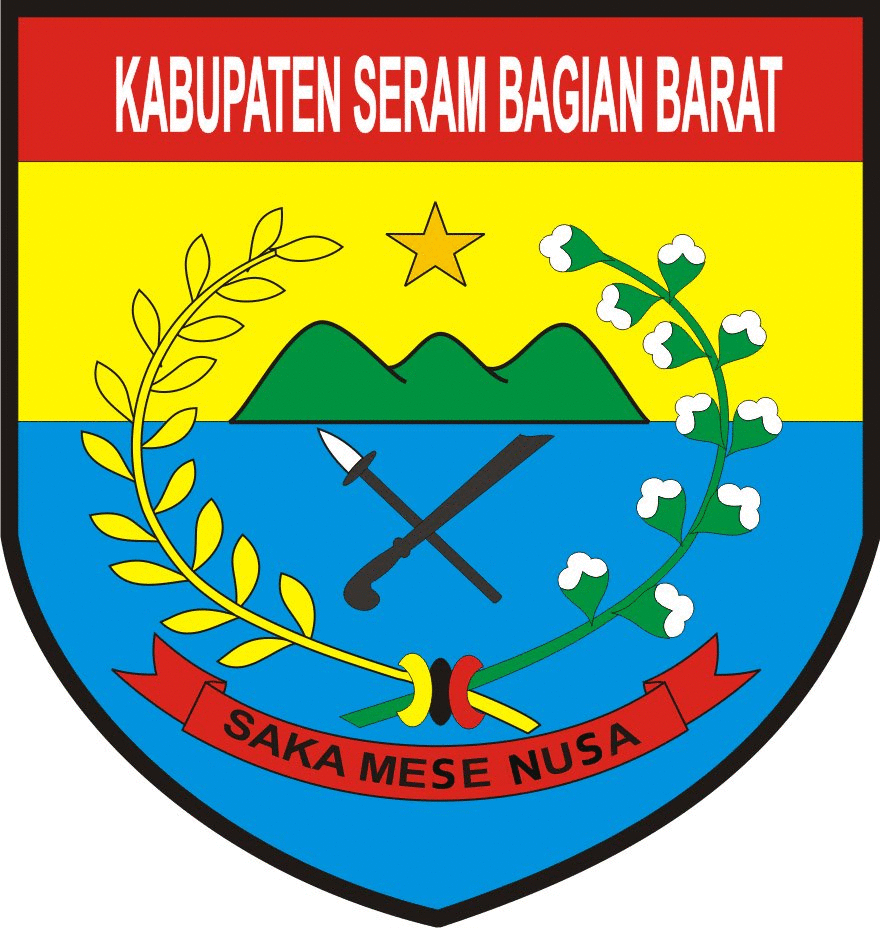
- Coat of arms
- Motto: Saka Mese Nura (Protect and Defend the Island)
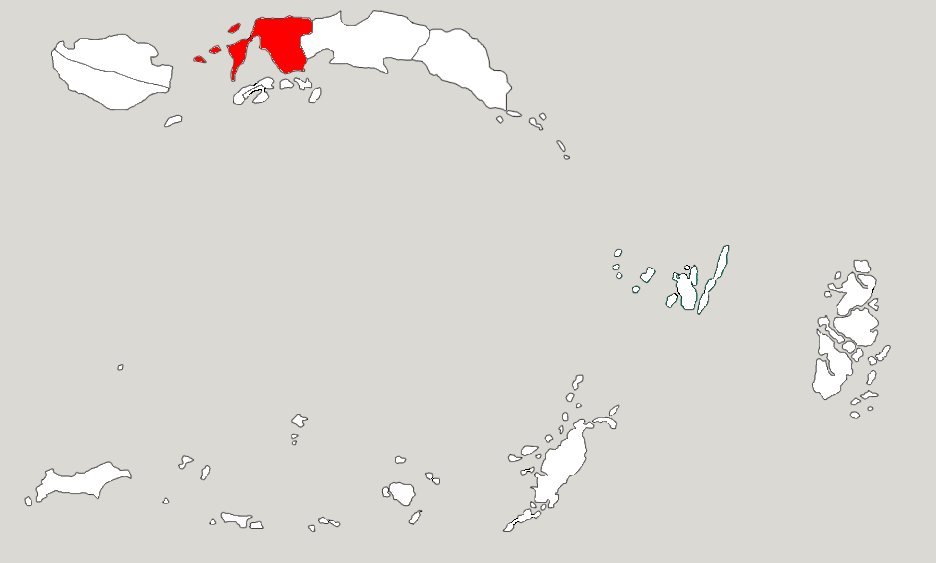
- Location within Maluku

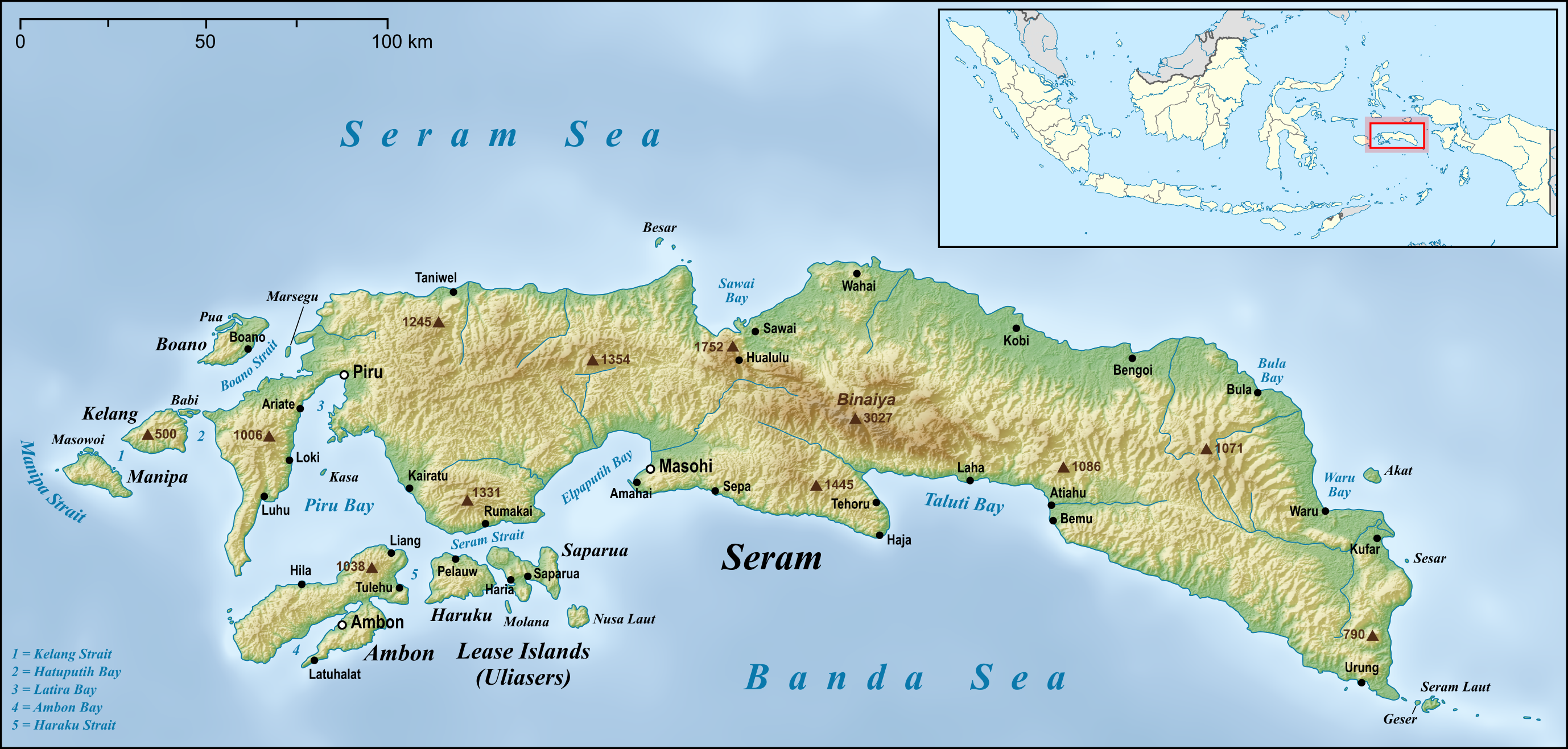
- Location in Seram, Maluku and Indonesia West Seram Regency (Maluku) West Seram Regency (Indonesia)
- Coordinates: 3.1027°S 128.4300°E
- Country: Indonesia
- Province: Maluku
- Capital: Piru

Government
  - Regent: Asri Arman
  - Vice Regent: Selfinus Kainama

Area
  - Total: 5,014.24 km^{2} (1,936.01 sq mi)

Population (mid 2025 estimate)
  - Total: 218,637
  - Density: 43.6032/km^{2} (112.932/sq mi)
- Time zone: UTC+9 (IEST)
- Area code: (+62) 911
- Website: sbbkab.go.id

West Seram Regency is a regency of Maluku, Indonesia. It is mainly located on Seram, but includes various islands lying to the west of Seram - the largest being Manipa, Kelang and Buano, as well as the smaller islets of Babi, Pua, Masowoi, and Marsegu. It covers a land area of 5,014.24 km^{2}, and had a population of 164,654 at the 2010 Census and 212,393 at the 2020 Census; the official estimate as at mid 2025 was 218,637 (comprising 109,683 males and 108,954 females). The principal town lies at Piru, a port at the northern coast of Latira Bay (Teluk Latira) which is a northwards extension of Piru Bay (Teluk Piru) and almost separates the Huamual Peninsula from the rest of Seram Island. The western sector of the Regency (the Huamual Peninsula and the islands off the west coast) occupies just under 25% of the land area, but held over 42.2% of the Regency's population in 2025.

== Administrative districts ==
At the time of the 2010 Census the regency was divided into four districts (kecamatan) - Huamual Belakang in the far west (including the islands), Seram Barat in the centre-west, Kairatu in the southeast and Taniwel in the northeast. Subsequent to 2010, seven additional districts have been created by the division of the original four districts, so that the regency is now divided into eleven districts. The Manipa Islands District was cut out of Huamual Belakang District, the new Huamual District was cut out of Seram Barat District, four new districts (West Kairatu, Inamosol, Amalatu and Elpaputih) were cut out of Kairatu District, and East Taniwel District was cut out of Taniwel District.

These districts are tabulated below with their areas and populations at the 2010 Census and 2020 Census, together with the official estimates as at mid 2025. The table also includes the locations of the district headquarters, as well as the number of administrative villages (all classed as rural desa) in each district, and its postal code.

Kode Wilayah	Name of District (kecamatan)	Area in km^{2}	Pop'n Census 2010	Pop'n Census 2020	Pop'n Estimate mid 2025	Admin centre	No. of villages	Post code
81.06.04	Huamual Belakang ^{(a)}	409.65	25,629	33,132	36,191	Waesala	7	97567
81.06.09	Kepulauan Manipa (Manipa Islands) ^{(b)}	159.71	5,810	7,165	8,091	Masawoi	7	97569
81.06.08	Huamual ^{(c)}	1,162.99	34,919	49,097	48,026	Luhu	5	97560
	Totals of Western sector	1,732.35	66,358	89,394	92,306		19	
81.06.02	Seram Barat ^{(d)} (West Seram)	503.33	27,311	35,045	35,921	Piru	7 ^{(e)}	97562
81.06.01	Kairatu	329.65	23,240	27,040	27,065	Kairatu	7	97566
81.06.07	Kairatu Barat ^{(f)} (West Kairatu)	132.25	13,146	14,478	14,275	Kamal	6	97568
81.06.06	Inamosol ^{(f)}	504.61	5,311	6,422	6,862	Honitetu	5	97565
81.06.05	Amalatu ^{(f)}	665.35	10,979	12,537	13,292	Latu	7	97563
81.06.11	Elpaputih ^{(f)}	1,165.74	1,453	5,233	5,110	Elpaputih	7	97564
81.06.03	Taniwel	1,181.32	12,133	15,448	16,307	Taniwel	19	97559
81.06.10	Taniwel Timur ^{(g)} (East Taniwel)	733.80	5,375	6,796	7,497	Uwen Pantai	15	97561
	Totals of Eastern sector	5,014.24	98,948	122,999	126,329		73	
	Totals	6,948.40	164,654	212,393	218,637		92	

Notes: (a) Huamual Belakang District includes Buano (formerly Boano) and Kelang Islands, as well as Babi (a small island situated between Kelang Island and Seram), Pua (a small island off Buano) and 26 other small islands, as well as part of the 'mainland' of Seram (the 2 desa of Waesala and Allang Asaude). The district comprises the 7 towns and villages (all classed as desa) of Tahalupu (with 7,775 inhabitants as at mid 2024), Sole (3,212) and Tonu Jaya (2,100) - all 3 on Kelang Island; Buano Selatan (1,772) and Buano Utara (or Putia)(8,890) - both on Buano Island; and Waesala (10,848) and Allang Asaude (1,125) in the northern part of the Huamual Peninsula on Seram Island.
(b) Manipa Islands District consists of the main island of Manipa together with adjacent small islands; it was formerly part of Huamual Belakang District.
(c) formerly part of Seram Barat District, this district comprises the southern part of the Huamual Peninsula; in the north it is now bordered by Huamual Belakang and Seram Barat Districts, in the south it is bordered by the Banda Sea, in the east it is bordered by the residual Seram Barat District, and in the west it is bordered by the Manipa Passage. The district comprises the 5 towns and villages (all classed as desa) - Luhu (with 26,709 inhabitants in mid 2024), Lokki (12,780), Iha (6,358), Ariate (1,158) and Kulur (934).
(d) includes the northeast part of the Huamual Peninsula as well as areas further east.
(e) the 7 desa are Piru (a town with 16,377 inhabitants in mid 2023), Eti (7,625), Kawa (5,904), Kaibobo (2,083), Lumoli (1,424), Neniari (1,226) and Morekau (959).
(f) formerly parts of Kairatu District. (g) formerly part of Taniwel District.

== Nature Reserves ==
There are two major Nature Reserves within the regency. The Sahuwai Nature Reserve covers an area of 28,872 hectares within the Huamual Peninsula. Further to the northeast, the Pulau Marsegu DSK (Nature Recreation Park) covers an area of 11,000 hectares; Marsegu Island has a very high diversity of marine resources, various types of birds and various vegetation diversity of trees; the results of research conducted in the eastern and western parts of Marsegu Island found 22 species of trees in the protected forest on Marsegu Island.
