= Boano language (Maluku) =

Austronesian language spoken in Maluku, Indonesia

Boano
- Buano
- Sou Puan
- Native to: Indonesia
- Region: Boano Island, Maluku
- Native speakers: (3,240 cited 1982)
- Language family: Austronesian: Malayo-Polynesian (MP); Central–Eastern MP; Central Maluku ?; East Central Maluku; Seram ?; Nunusaku; Piru Bay; West; Hoamoal; Boano

Language codes
- ISO 639-3: bzn
- Glottolog: boan1242
- ELP: Boano (Maluku, Indonesia)

Boano (Buano) is an Austronesian language spoken in eastern Indonesia. It is spoken in Boano island, off the western end of Seram Island.
