= Piru, Indonesia =

Piru
- Town
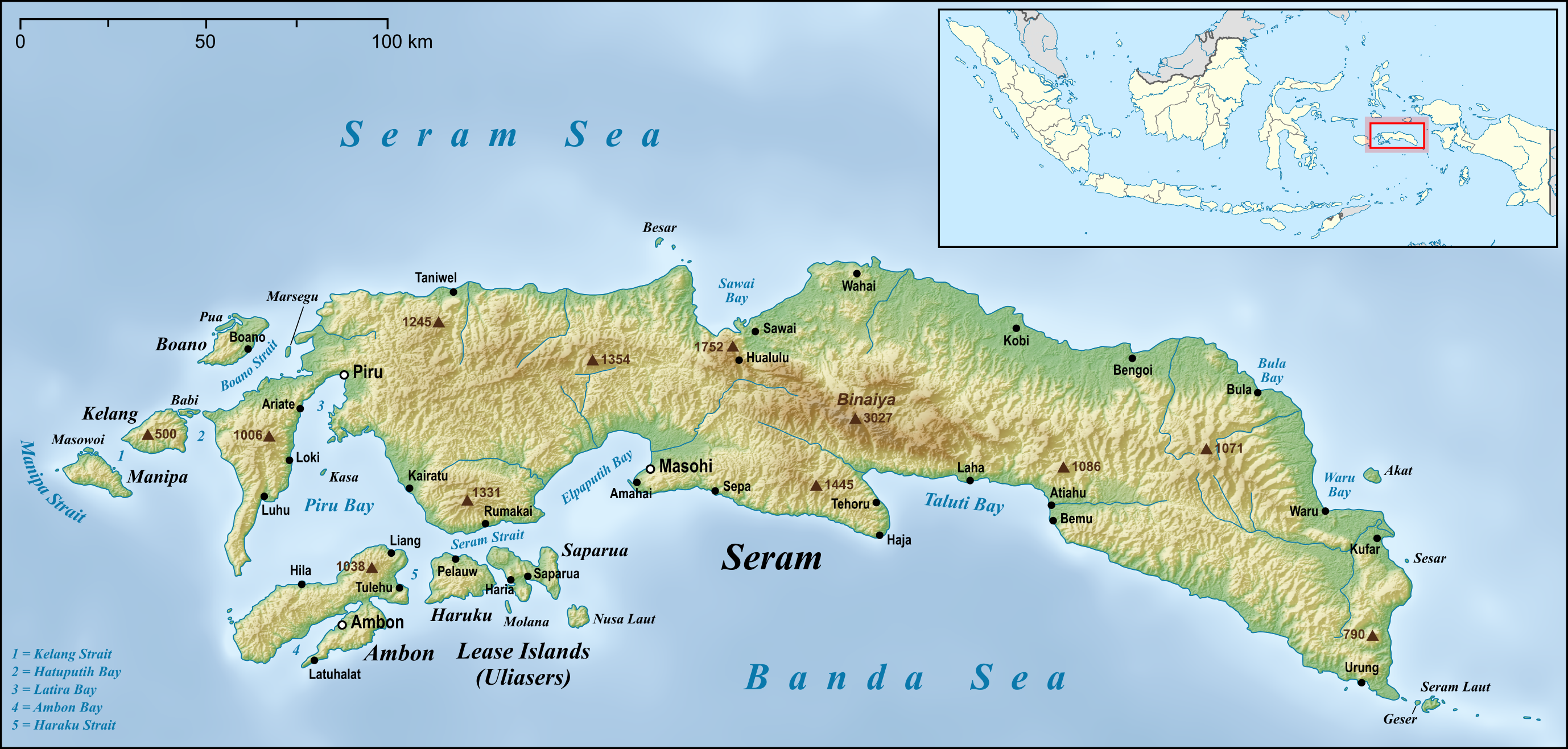
- Location in Seram Island
- Coordinates: 3°4′52″S 128°8′28″E
- Country: Indonesia
- Province: Maluku
- Regency: West Seram

Population (mid 2022 estimate)
  - Total: 16,368
- Time zone: UTC+9 (WITA)

Piru is a small town and capital of the West Seram Regency on the southwestern coast of the Indonesian island of Seram. At the 2020 Census, it had 16,336 inhabitants, increasing to 16,368 at the mid 2022 official estimate.

On 21–22 August 1999 there was violent conflict in the area and other settlements such as Ariate, Loki, Laala and Wailissa, which resulted in 12 deaths in total on the island.

== Climate ==
Piru has a tropical rainforest climate (Af) with moderate rainfall in July and August and heavy rainfall in the remaining months.

Climate data for Piru
Month	Jan	Feb	Mar	Apr	May	Jun	Jul	Aug	Sep	Oct	Nov	Dec	Year
Mean daily maximum °C (°F)	30.8 (87.4)	30.8 (87.4)	30.7 (87.3)	30.1 (86.2)	29.4 (84.9)	28.5 (83.3)	27.6 (81.7)	27.8 (82.0)	28.9 (84.0)	29.7 (85.5)	30.9 (87.6)	30.8 (87.4)	29.7 (85.4)
Daily mean °C (°F)	27.4 (81.3)	27.3 (81.1)	27.3 (81.1)	26.9 (80.4)	26.6 (79.9)	26.0 (78.8)	25.3 (77.5)	25.4 (77.7)	26.0 (78.8)	26.4 (79.5)	27.3 (81.1)	27.3 (81.1)	26.6 (79.9)
Mean daily minimum °C (°F)	24.0 (75.2)	23.9 (75.0)	23.9 (75.0)	23.8 (74.8)	23.8 (74.8)	23.5 (74.3)	23.1 (73.6)	23.1 (73.6)	23.2 (73.8)	23.2 (73.8)	23.8 (74.8)	23.9 (75.0)	23.6 (74.5)
Average rainfall mm (inches)	214 (8.4)	205 (8.1)	211 (8.3)	183 (7.2)	184 (7.2)	173 (6.8)	107 (4.2)	117 (4.6)	139 (5.5)	128 (5.0)	197 (7.8)	283 (11.1)	2,141 (84.2)
Source: Climate-Data.org
