= Luhu language =

Austronesian language spoken in Maluku, Indonesia

Luhu
- Native to: Indonesia
- Region: Seram Island, Maluku
- Native speakers: (6,500 cited 1983) extinct by 2010 (Piru)
- Language family: Austronesian: Malayo-Polynesian; Central–Eastern Malayo-Polynesian; Central Maluku ?; East Central Maluku; Seram ?; Nunusaku; Piru Bay; West; Hoamoal; Luhu
- Dialects: Piru †

Language codes
- ISO 639-3: lcq – inclusive code Individual code: ppr – Piru (retired)
- Glottolog: luhu1243
- ELP: Piru

Luhu is an Austronesian language spoken in the west of Seram Island in eastern Indonesia. It was spoken in Luhu village on Hoamoal Peninsula at the western end of Seram, and in Boano and Kelang islands, off the western tip of Seram Island.

The northernmost dialect, Piru, was separated from the rest of the language through colonial depopulation, and was influenced by neighboring languages as it became moribund. In 1989, there were an estimated 3,500 native speakers, but by 2010, the language had gone extinct.
