= Halmahera paradise kingfisher =

Scientific classification
- Kingdom: Animalia
- Phylum: Chordata
- Class: Aves
- Order: Coraciiformes
- Family: Alcedinidae
- Subfamily: Halcyoninae
- Genus: Tanysiptera
- Species: T. margarethae

Binomial name
- Tanysiptera margarethae Heine, 1860

Synonyms
- Tanysiptera galatea margarethae

Species of bird

The Halmahera paradise kingfisher (Tanysiptera margarethae) is a species of bird in the family Alcedinidae. It is found in the northern Moluccas in Indonesia. It was described by Ferdinand Heine in 1860.

== Taxonomy and systematics ==
This species was formerly considered a subspecies of the common paradise kingfisher but was separated from it along with four other species based on an examination of the calls of the members of the galatea complex.

Four subspecies are recognised-

- Tanysiptera margarethae browningi Ripley, 1983- Halmahera
- Tanysiptera margarethae brunhildae Jany, 1955- Doi island
- Tanysiptera margarethae margarethae Heine, 1860- Bacan
- Tanysiptera margarethae sabrina Gray, 1861- Kayoa

== Description ==
Subspecies margarethae is similar to subspecies galatea of the common paradise kingfisher, but it differs from it because of its purple-blue crown and a mainly blue tail. Subspecies brunhildae has a blue tail with white sides, while browningi has a deep blue crown encircled by a narrow line of cobalt-colored feathers. Subspecies sabrina has a white patch in the middle of the back and entirely white outer tail feathers.

The juvenile is brown with a vertically barred breast and a short tail.

Illustration in A Monograph of the Alcedinidae by Richard Bowdler Sharpe

== Habits ==
The call of this species differs from the rest of the complex by having a descending introductory note followed by another introductory note which is then followed by a trill that gradually increases in pitch.

This species nests in arboreal termite mounds, mostly in trees of Vitex cofassus, at a distance of 5 m from the ground, from September to January. The clutch size is 2.
