= Manipa =

Island in Indonesia

- Location of Manipa

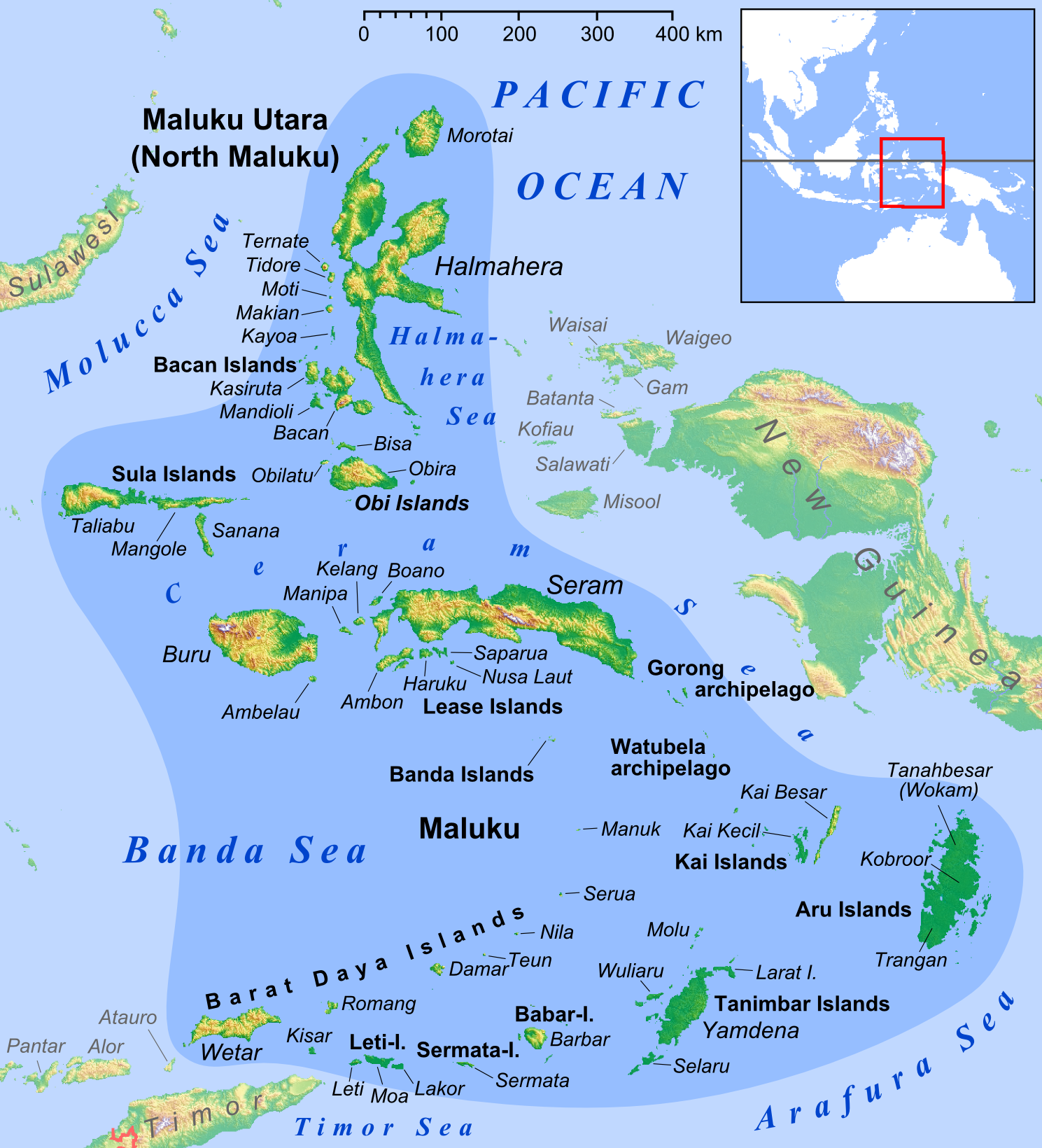

Geography
- Location: South East Asia
- Archipelago: Maluku Islands
- Area: 159.71 km^{2} (61.66 sq mi)
- Highest elevation: 632 m (2073 ft)
- Highest point: Kala Huhun

Administration
- Indonesia

Demographics
- Population: 7,793 (mid 2023 estimate)
- Pop. density: 48.8/km^{2} (126.4/sq mi)
- Ethnic groups: Manipa and Butonese

Manipa Island is an island in West Seram Regency, Maluku Province, Indonesia. It is located 8 km off the western coast of Kelang (from which it is separated by the Kelang Strait) at the western end of Seram Island and 25 km off the western coast of Buru. Including adjacent small islands, it forms an administrative district (kecamatan) within the regency, with its district centre at Masawoi. The district covers an area of 159.71 km^{2} and had a population of 7,165 at the 2020 Census; the official estimate as at mid 2023 was 7,793.

There are 7 villages (desa), listed with their populations according to the official estimates as at mid 2022: Luhutuban (3,288), Tuniwara (865), Buano Hatuputih (359), Tomalehu Barat (1,057), Tomalehu Timur (285), Kelang Asaude (889) and Masawoi (727). The inhabitants speak the Manipa language, as well as Indonesian and Ambonese Malay.

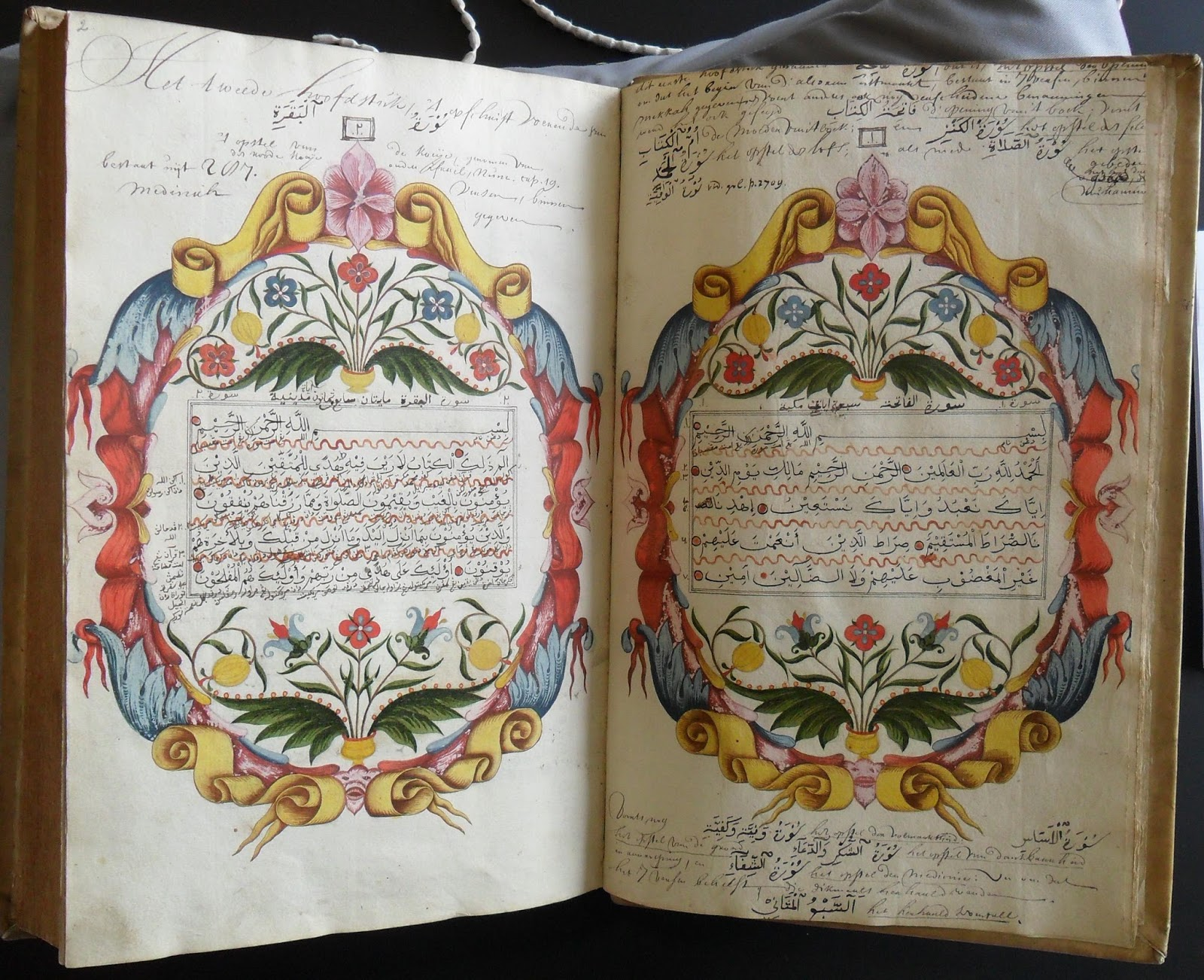
Illuminated opening in the Western style of the Qur'an from Manipa, dated 1694. Adriaan Reland collection. Leiden University Library

This island gives its name to the Manipa Strait between Buru and Seram.

== Adjacent islands ==
Manipa District includes a number of small offshore islands that are very close to its shores.

- Masawi and Asamamonuke on a reef on its northeastern coast.
- Maupora off its western tip. It is located in the Manipa Strait between Buru and Seram. Notoriously called Suanggi, other names include Batu Timbul or Watupalpiali. 3°18′S 127°28′E
- Tuban in the south
- Luhu in the north.
