= Kulur, Indonesia =

Kulur
- Town
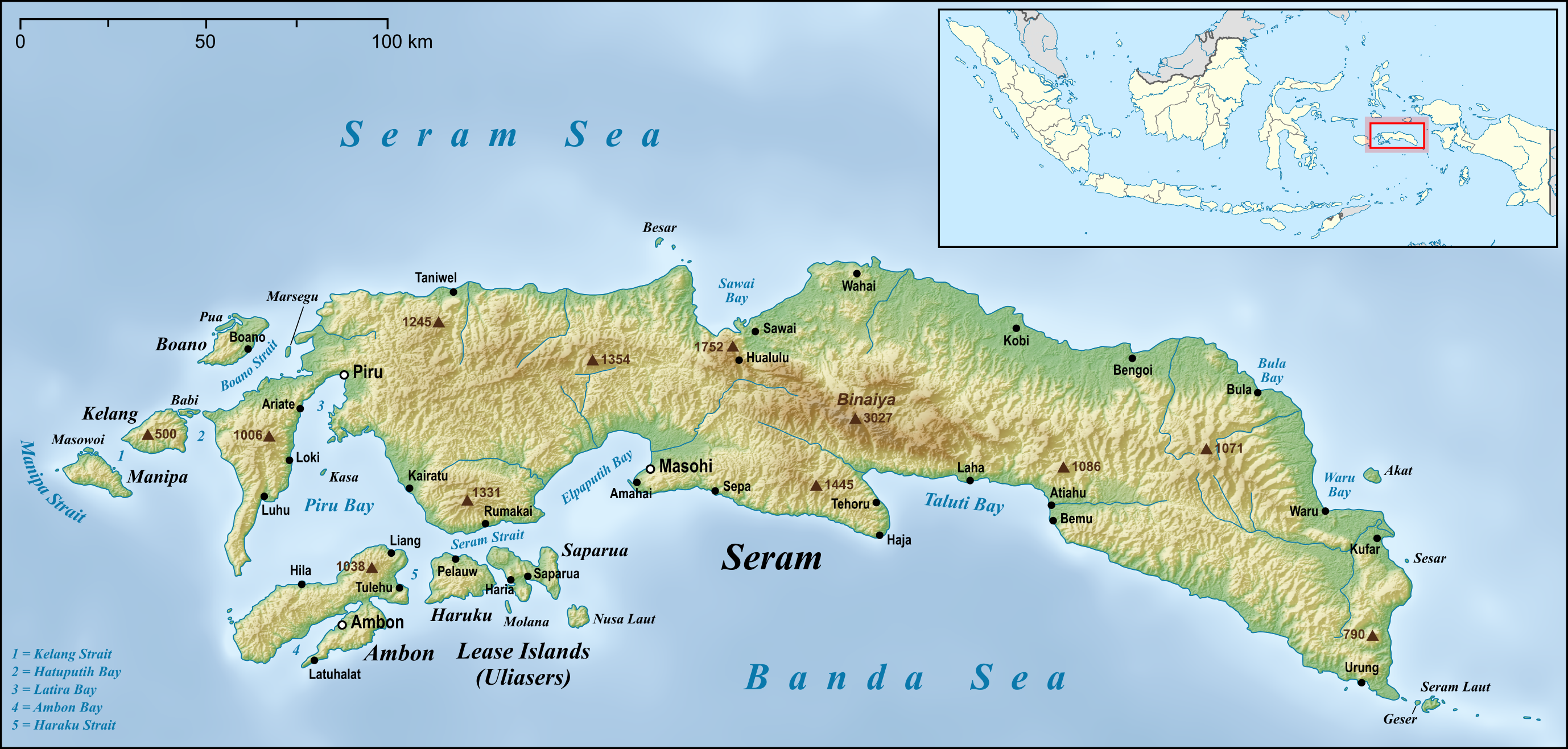
- Location in Seram Island
- Coordinates: 3°23′30″S 127°58′50″E
- Country: Indonesia
- Province: Maluku
- Regency: West Seram
- Time zone: UTC+8 (WITA)

Kulur is a small town on the southwestern coast of the Indonesian island of Seram. It is believed that the people of Kulur moved from Saparua to Piru Bay during the Dutch rule of the 17th century to avoid having to change religion, and returned at the time of the Pattimura rebellion in 1817. Many locals today still speak the Saparua language, particularly a dialect known as Iha-Kulur.
