= R556 (South Africa) =

Regional route in South Africa

Regional route R556

Route information
- Length: 80.2 km (49.8 mi)

Major junctions
- North-west end: R565 in Sun City
- R510 north of Rustenburg; N4 in Modderspruit
- South-east end: R104 in Modderspruit

Location
- Country: South Africa

Highway system
- Numbered routes of South Africa
| ← R555 | → R557 |

The R556 is a Regional Route in North West, South Africa that connects Sun City with Modderspruit.

== Route ==
Its north-western terminus is in Sun City, at a junction with the northern terminus of the R565 from Rustenburg (east of Phatsima). It heads east, passing the southern entrance of the Pilanesberg National Park, bypassing the Sun City Resort and the Pilanesberg International Airport, before bending south-east to cross the R510 south of Monakato. It proceeds south-east through Barseba to cross the N4 (Platinum Highway) at Modderspruit. It ends shortly thereafter at a junction with the R104.
