= R565 (South Africa) =

Regional route in South Africa

Regional route R565

Route information
- Length: 32.3 km (20.1 mi)

Major junctions
- North end: R556 in Sun City
- South end: R104 in Rustenburg

Location
- Country: South Africa
- Major cities: Sun City, Rustenburg

Highway system
- Numbered routes of South Africa
← R564	→ R566

The R565 is a Regional Route in North West, South Africa that connects Sun City with Rustenburg.

== Route ==
Its northern terminus is in Sun City, at a junction with the north-western terminus of the R556 (south of Pilanesberg National Park, east of Phatsima and west of the Sun City Resort). It heads south-south-east for 32 kilometres to pass through Phokeng and end at a junction with the R104 in Rustenburg (north-west of the city centre).
