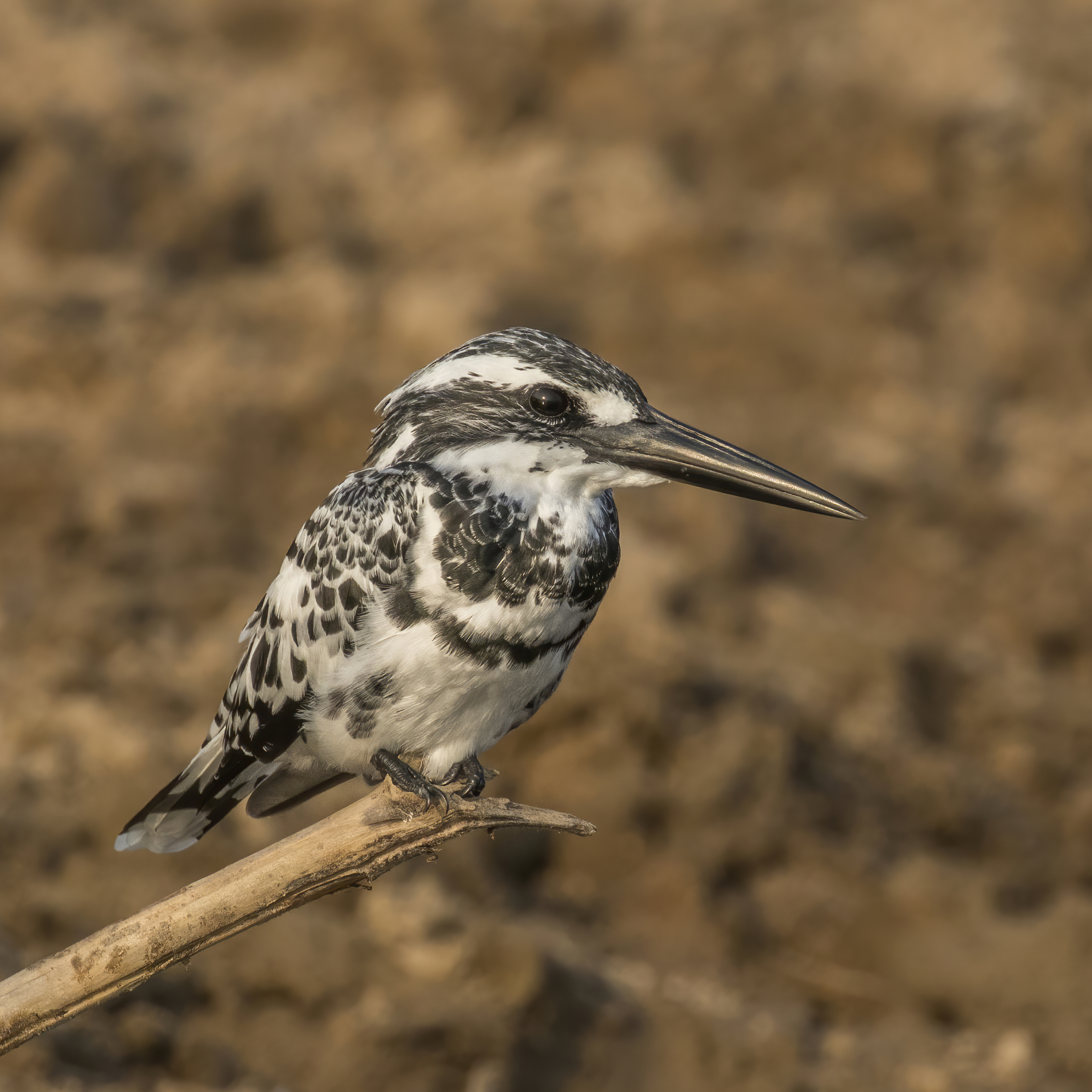
- Male
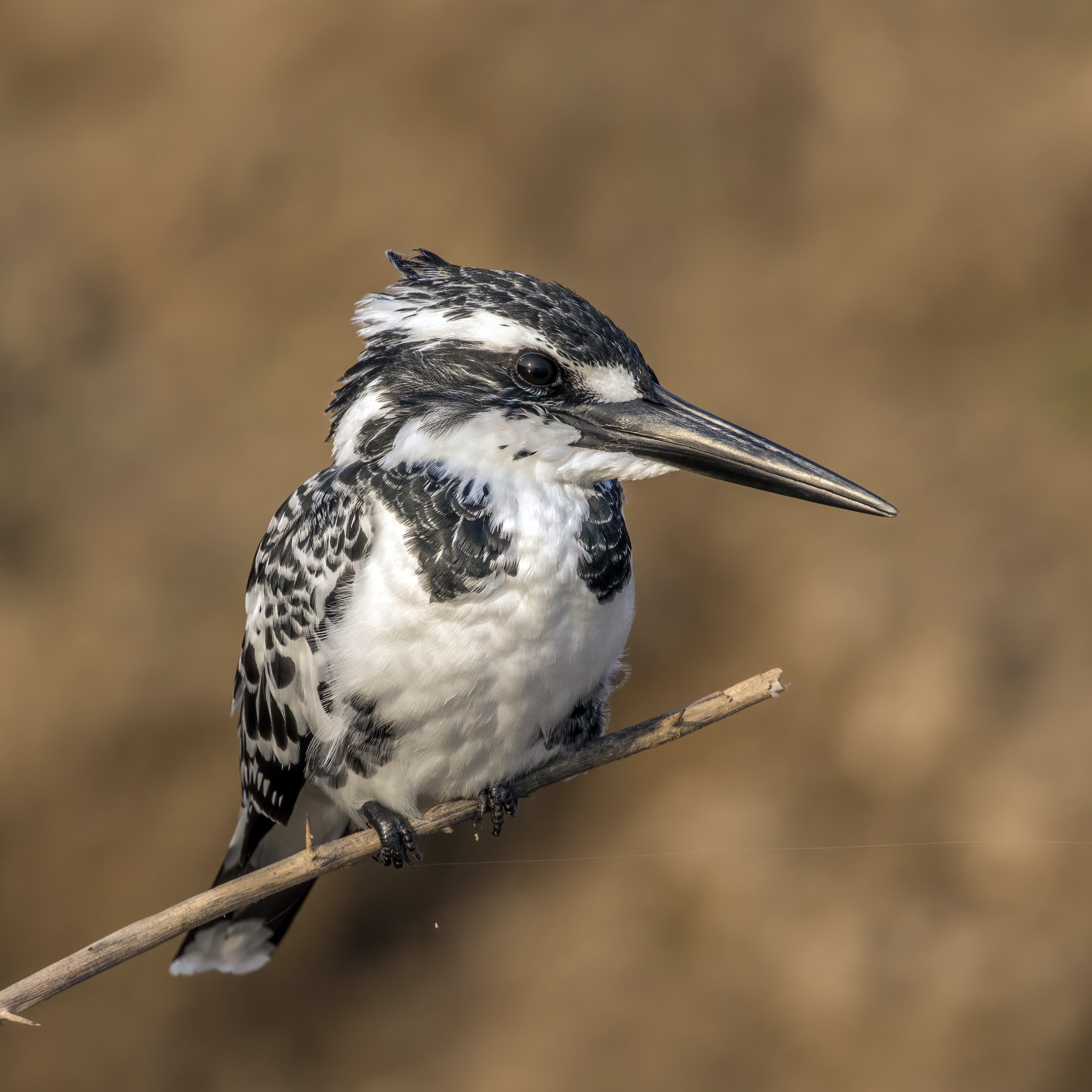
- Female both C. r. leucomelanurus Chambal River, Uttar Pradesh, India

Conservation status
- Least Concern (IUCN 3.1)

Scientific classification
- Kingdom: Animalia
- Phylum: Chordata
- Class: Aves
- Order: Coraciiformes
- Family: Alcedinidae
- Subfamily: Cerylinae
- Genus: Ceryle; F. Boie, 1828
- Species: C. rudis

Binomial name
- Ceryle rudis (Linnaeus, 1758)

Synonyms
- Alcedo rudis Linnaeus, 1758

= Pied kingfisher =

Species of bird

The pied kingfisher (Ceryle rudis) is a species of water kingfisher widely distributed across Africa and Asia. Originally described by Carl Linnaeus in 1758, it has five recognised subspecies, and is the only member of the genus Ceryle. Its black-and white-plumage and crest, as well as its habit of hovering over clear lakes and rivers before diving for fish, make it distinctive. Males have a double band across the breast, while females have a single broken breast band. They are usually found in pairs or small family groups. When perched, they often bob their heads and flick up their tails.

== Taxonomy and evolution ==
The pied kingfisher was one of the many bird species originally described by Linnaeus in the landmark 1758 10th edition of his Systema Naturae, who noted that it lived in Persia and Egypt. He named it Alcedo rudis. The German naturalist Friedrich Boie erected the genus Ceryle in 1828. The name is from classical Greek kērulos, an unidentified and probably mythical bird mentioned by Aristotle and other authors. The specific epithet rudis is Latin for "wild" or "rude".

The pied kingfisher is the only member of the genus Ceryle. Molecular analysis shows it is an early offshoot of the lineage that gave rise to American kingfishers of the genus Chloroceryle. The pied kingfisher was initially believed to be descended from an ancestral American green kingfisher, which crossed the Atlantic Ocean about one million years ago. A more recent suggestion is that the pied kingfisher and the American green kingfishers are derived from an Old World species, with the pied kingfisher or its ancestor losing the metallic colouration afterwards.

The five subspecies are:

- C. r. syriacus Roselaar, 1995 – Turkey to Israel east to southwest Iran (some ornithologists do not recognise this subspecies)
- C. r. rudis (Linnaeus, 1758) – Egypt and Africa south of the Sahara
- C. r. leucomelanurus Reichenbach, 1851 – east Afghanistan through India to south China and north Indochina
- C. r. travancoreensis Whistler, 1935 – southwest India
- C. r. insignis Hartert, 1910 – east and southeast China, Hainan Island

== Description ==
This is a medium-sized kingfisher, about 25 cm (9.8 in) long with a white and black mask, a white supercilium, and black breast bands. The crest is neat and the upperparts are barred in black. Several subspecies are recognized within the broad distribution. The nominate race is found in sub-Saharan Africa, extending into West Asia. The subspecies C. r. syriacus is a larger, northern bird similar to the nominate subspecies (following Bergmann's rule). Subspecies leucomelanura is found from Afghanistan east into India, Thailand, and Southeast Asia. The subspecies C. r. travancoreensis of the Western Ghats is darker with the white reduced. The subspecies C. r. insignis is found in Hainan and southeastern China and has a much larger bill. Males have a narrow, second breast band, while females have a single broken breast band.

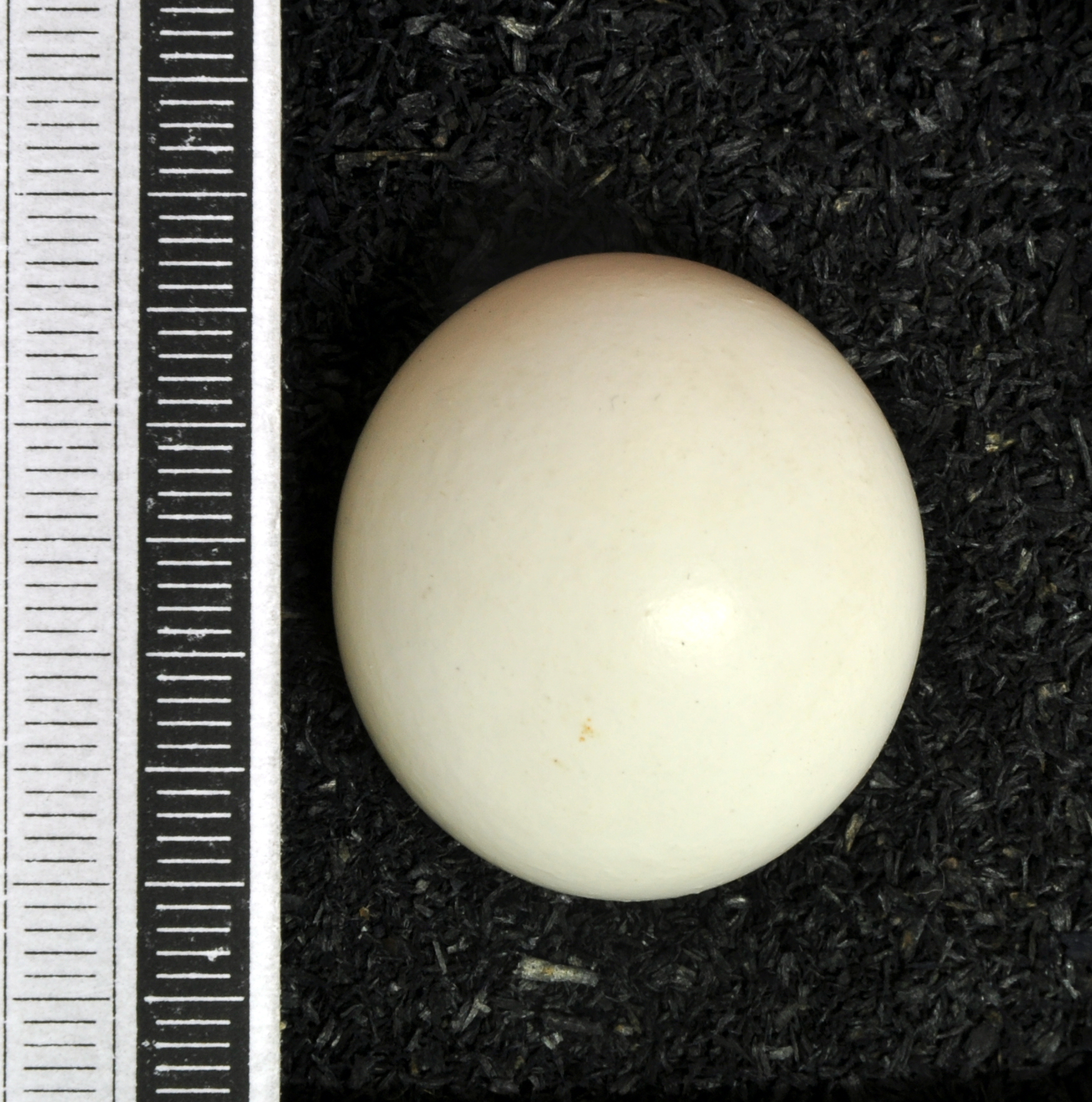
Egg, collection Museum Wiesbaden

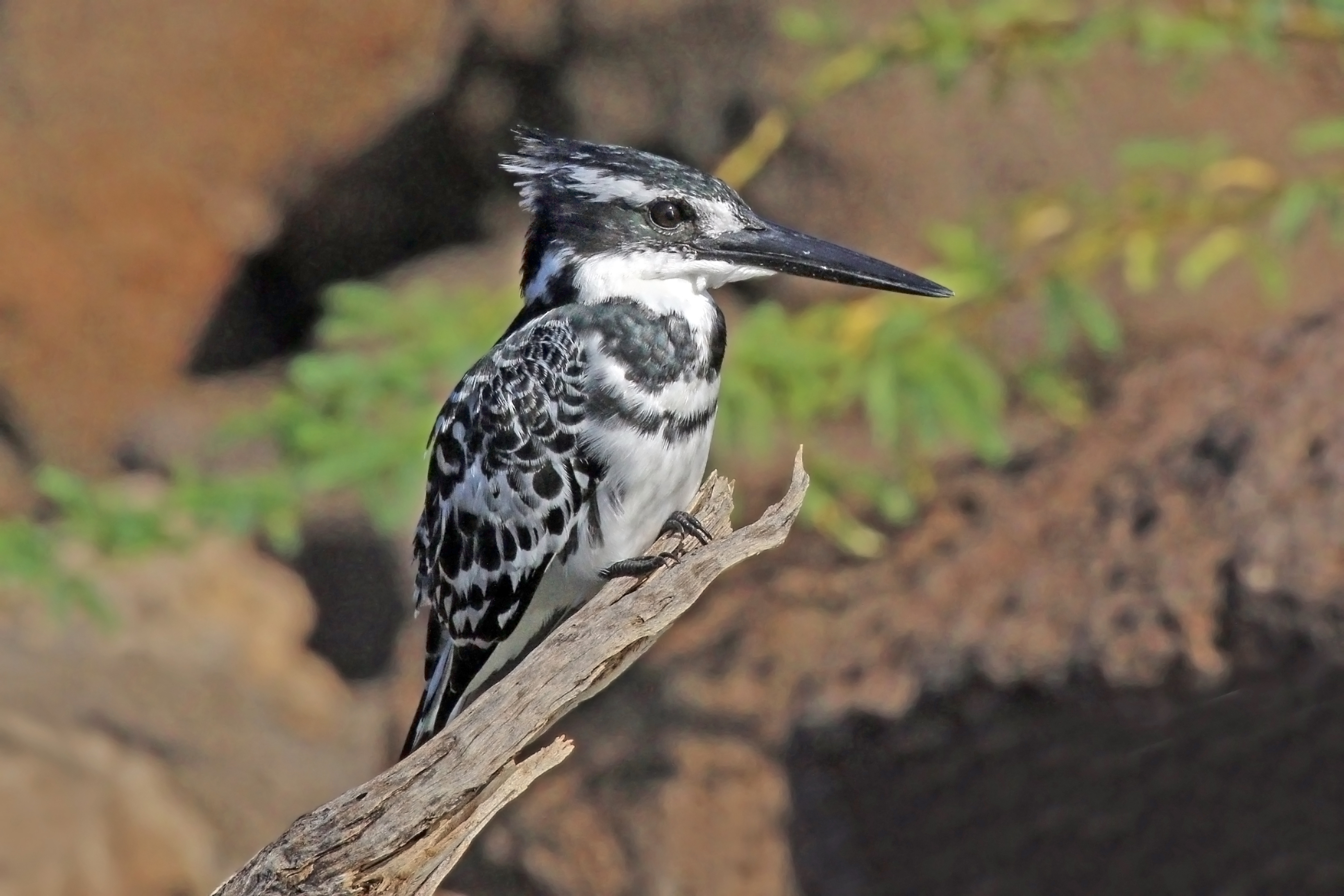
Immature male C. r. rudis
Uganda

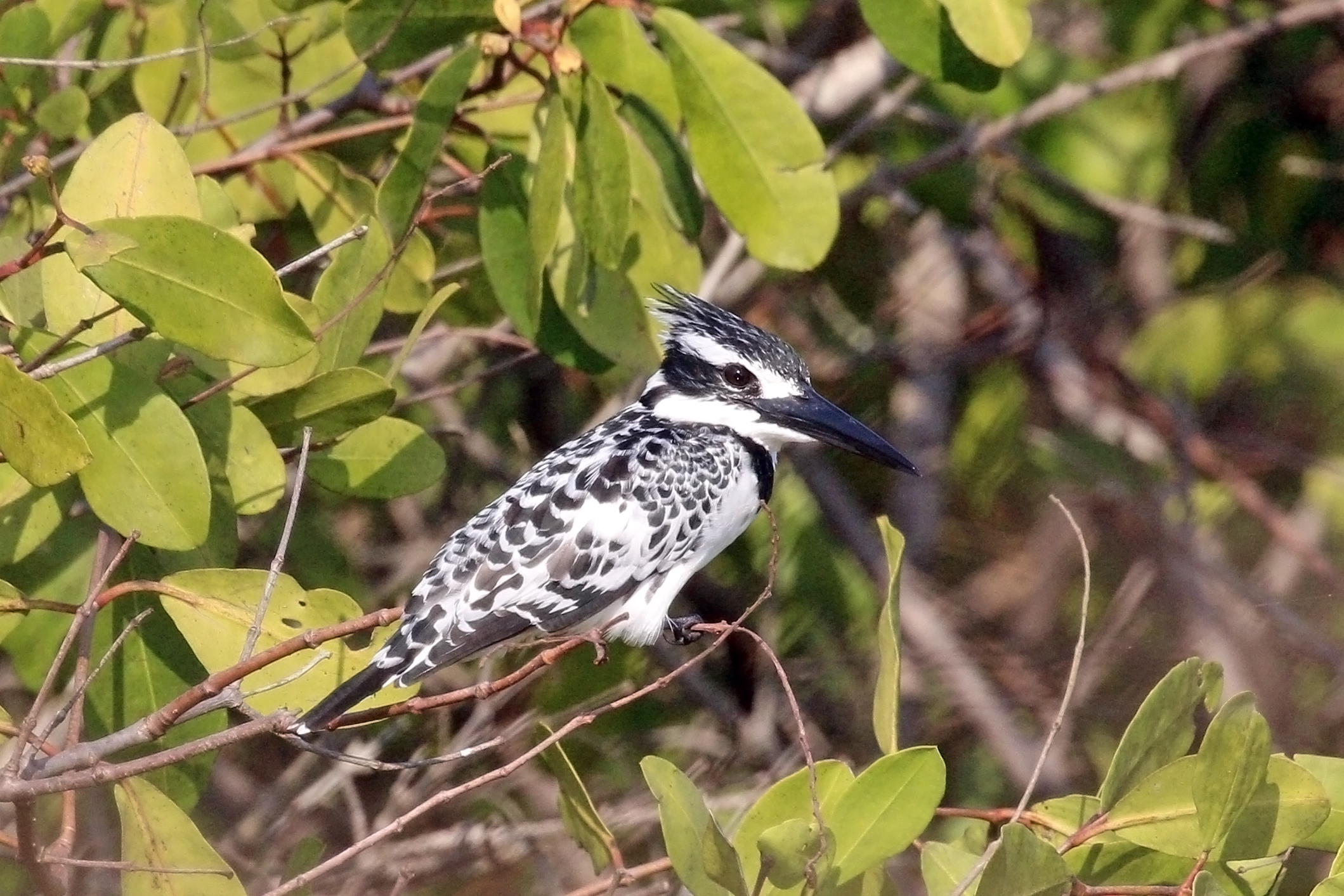
female C. r. rudis
the Gambia

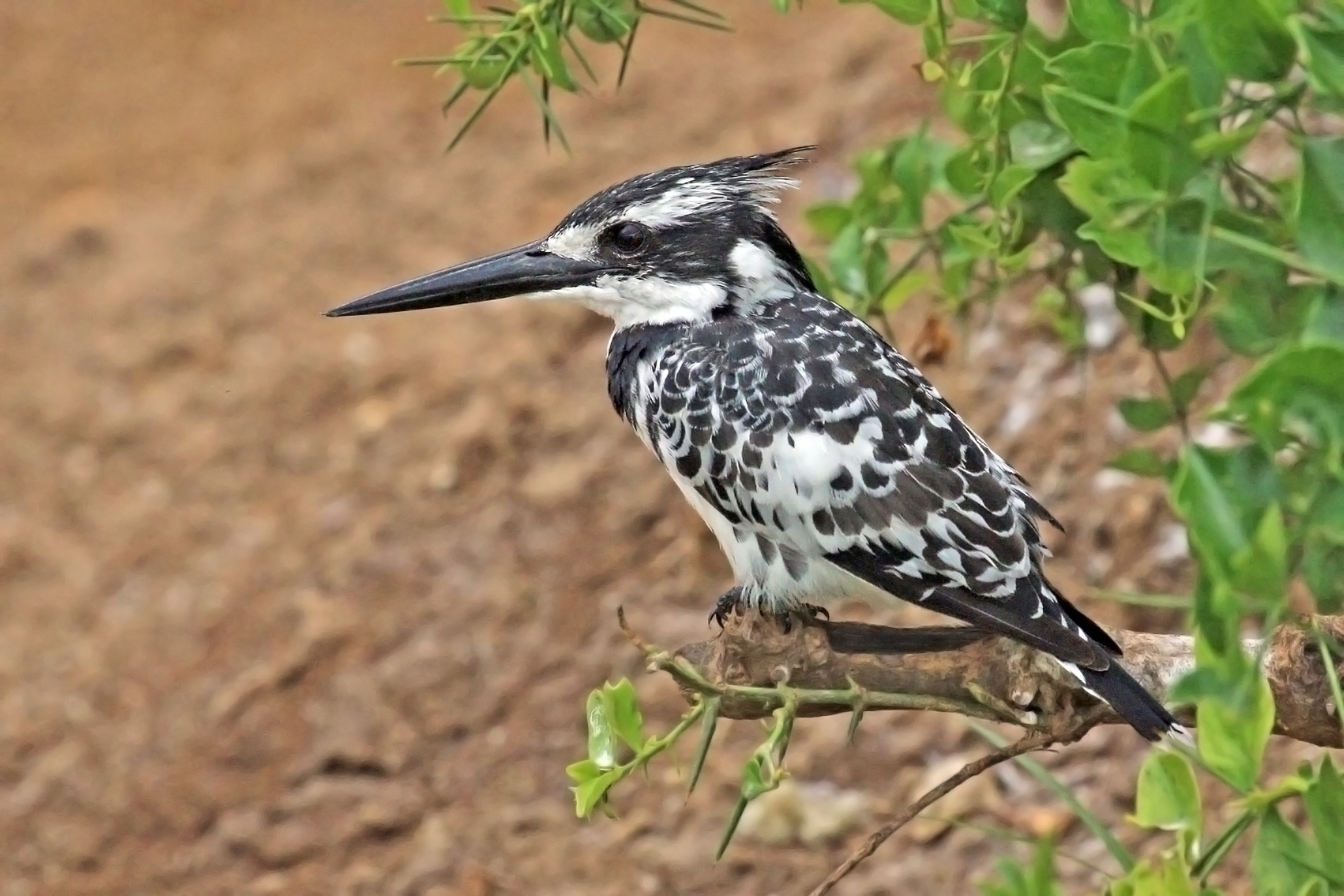
male C. r. rudis
Kazinga Channel, Uganda

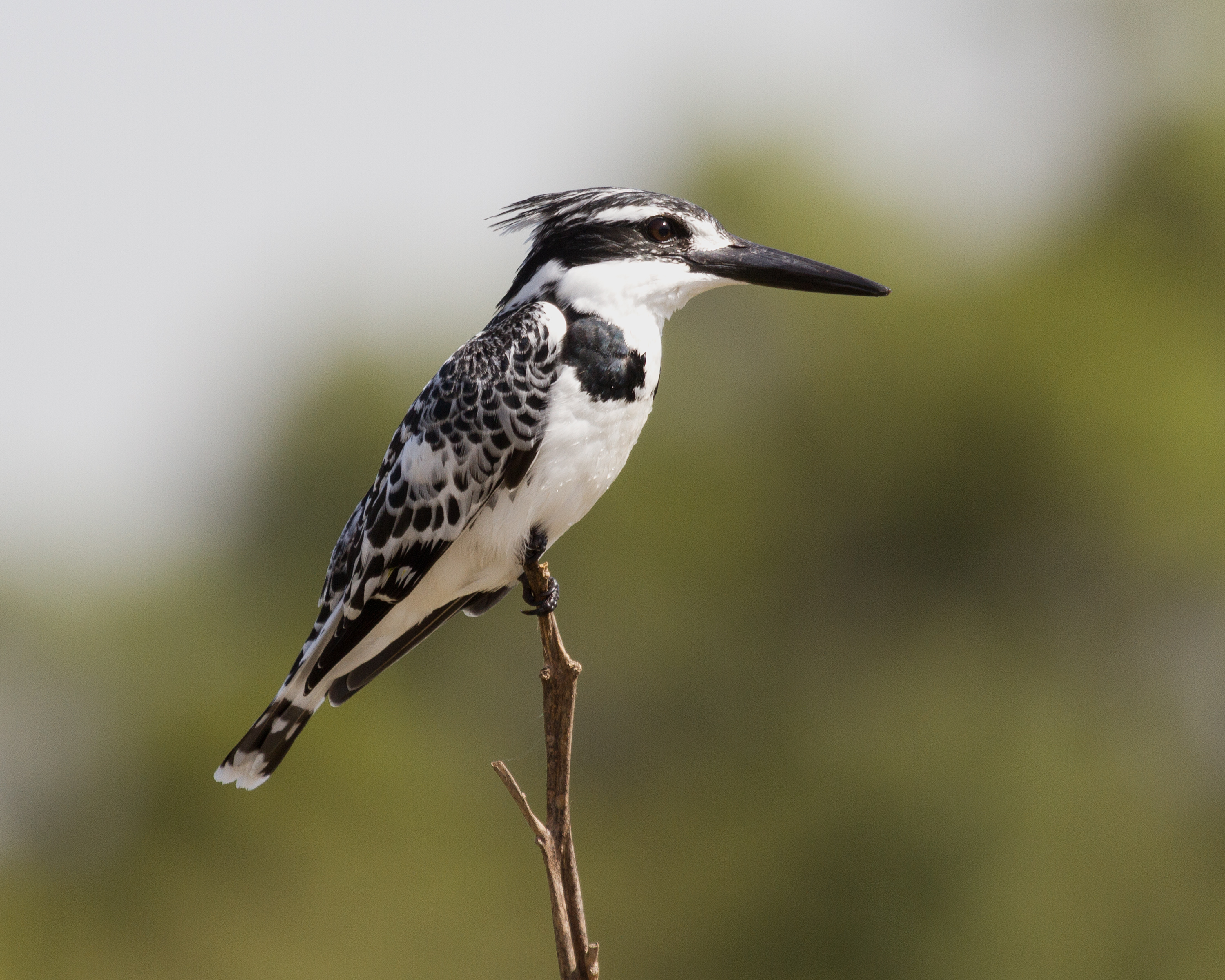
Female C. r. syriacus
Israel

C. r. rudis eating a fish
Pilanesberg Game Reserve, South Africa

== Distribution ==
It is common throughout sub-Saharan Africa and southern Asia from Turkey to India to China. It is resident, and most birds do not migrate, other than short-distance, seasonal movements. In India, it is distributed mainly on the plains and is replaced in the higher hills of the Himalayas by the crested kingfisher (Megaceryle lugubris).

The pied kingfisher is estimated to be one of the three most-numerous kingfishers in the world; the other two are the common kingfisher (Alcedo atthis) and collared kingfisher (Todiramphus chloris). It is a noisy bird, making it hard to miss.

== Behaviour ==
When perched, the pied kingfisher often bobs its heads up and down and sometimes raises its tail and flicks it downwards. It calls often with sharp chirruk chirruk notes. Unlike some kingfishers, it is quite gregarious, and forms large roosts at night.

=== Feeding ===
This kingfisher feeds mainly on fish, although it takes crustaceans and large aquatic insects such as dragonfly larvae. It usually hunts by hovering over the water to detect prey, before diving vertically, bill-first, to capture fish. When not foraging, it has a straight, rapid flight and have been observed flying at speeds approaching 50 km/h. In Lake Victoria in East Africa, the introduction of the Nile perch reduced the availability of haplochromine cichlids, which were formerly the preferred prey of these birds.

It can consume prey without returning to a perch, often manipulating the subject with its bill and swallowing in flight, so can hunt over large water bodies or in estuaries that lack perches required by other kingfishers.

=== Breeding ===
The breeding season in India is February to April. Its nest is a hole excavated in a vertical mud bank about 5 feet (1.8 m) above water. The nest tunnel is 4-5 feet deep and ends in a chamber. Several birds may nest in the same vicinity. The usual clutch is three to six white eggs. The pied kingfisher sometimes reproduces cooperatively, with young, nonbreeding birds from an earlier brood assisting parents or even unrelated older birds. In India, nestlings have been found to be prone to maggot infestations (probably by Protocalliphora species) and in some areas to leeches. Nest holes may sometimes be used for roosting.

In 1947, British zoologist Hugh B. Cott noticed while skinning birds that hornets were attracted to certain birds, but avoided the flesh of pied kingfishers. This led to a comparative study of edibility of birds, and he suggested that more conspicuously plumaged birds may be less palatable. This suggestion, however, was not supported by a subsequent reanalysis of his data.

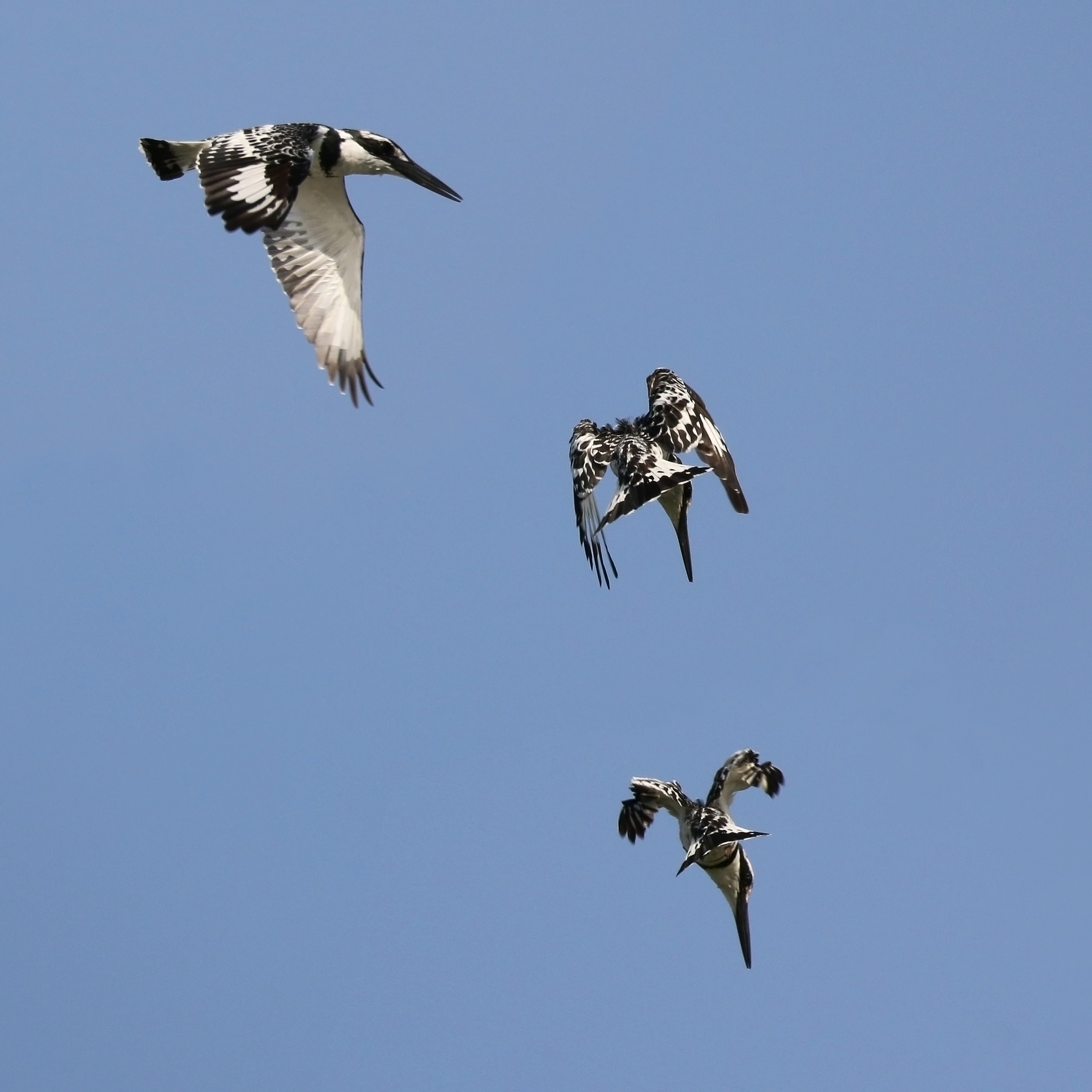
Composite showing C. rudis rudis dive, the Gambia

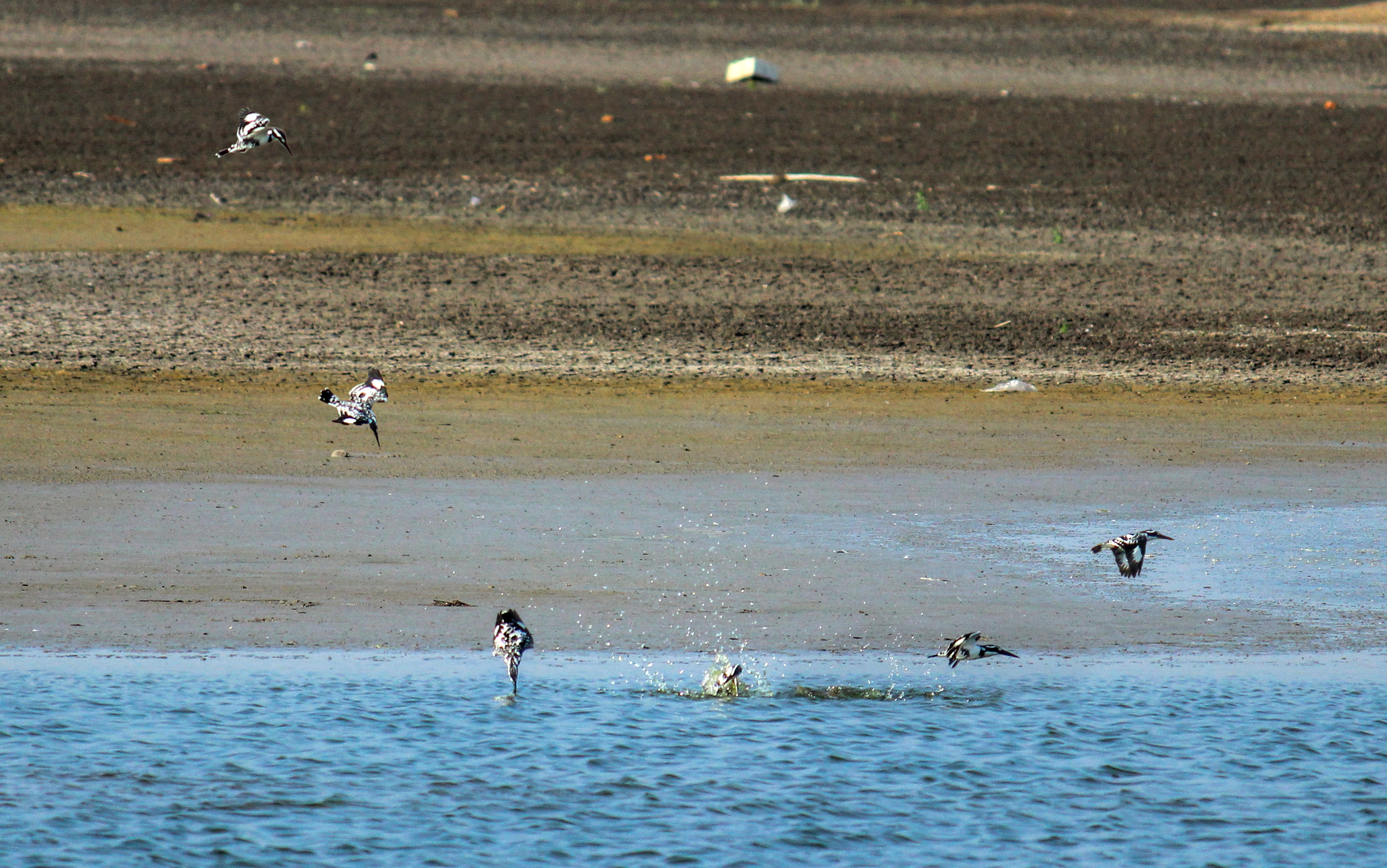
Composite showing fishing - from hovering to re-emergence

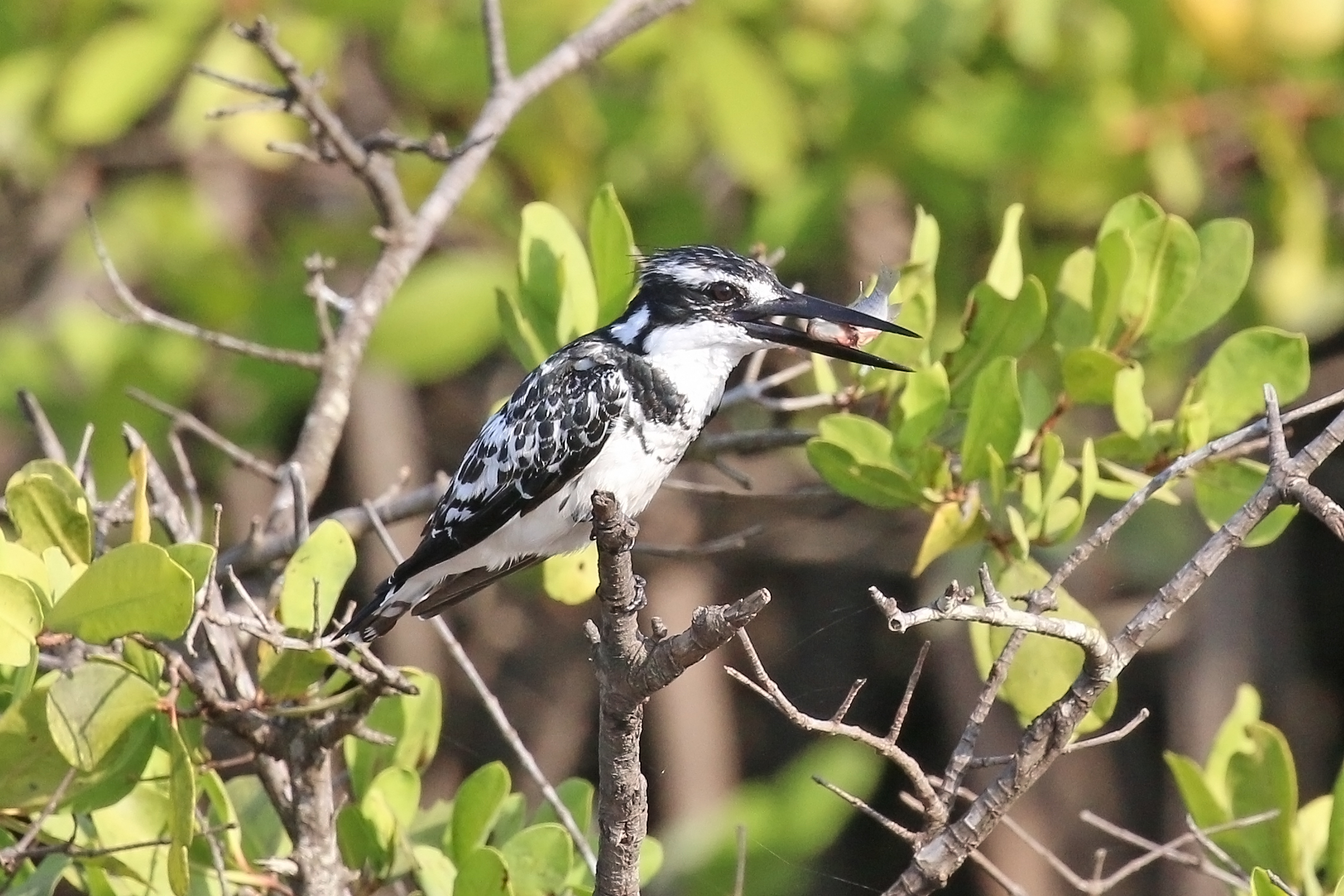
C. r. rudis eating fish
the Gambia

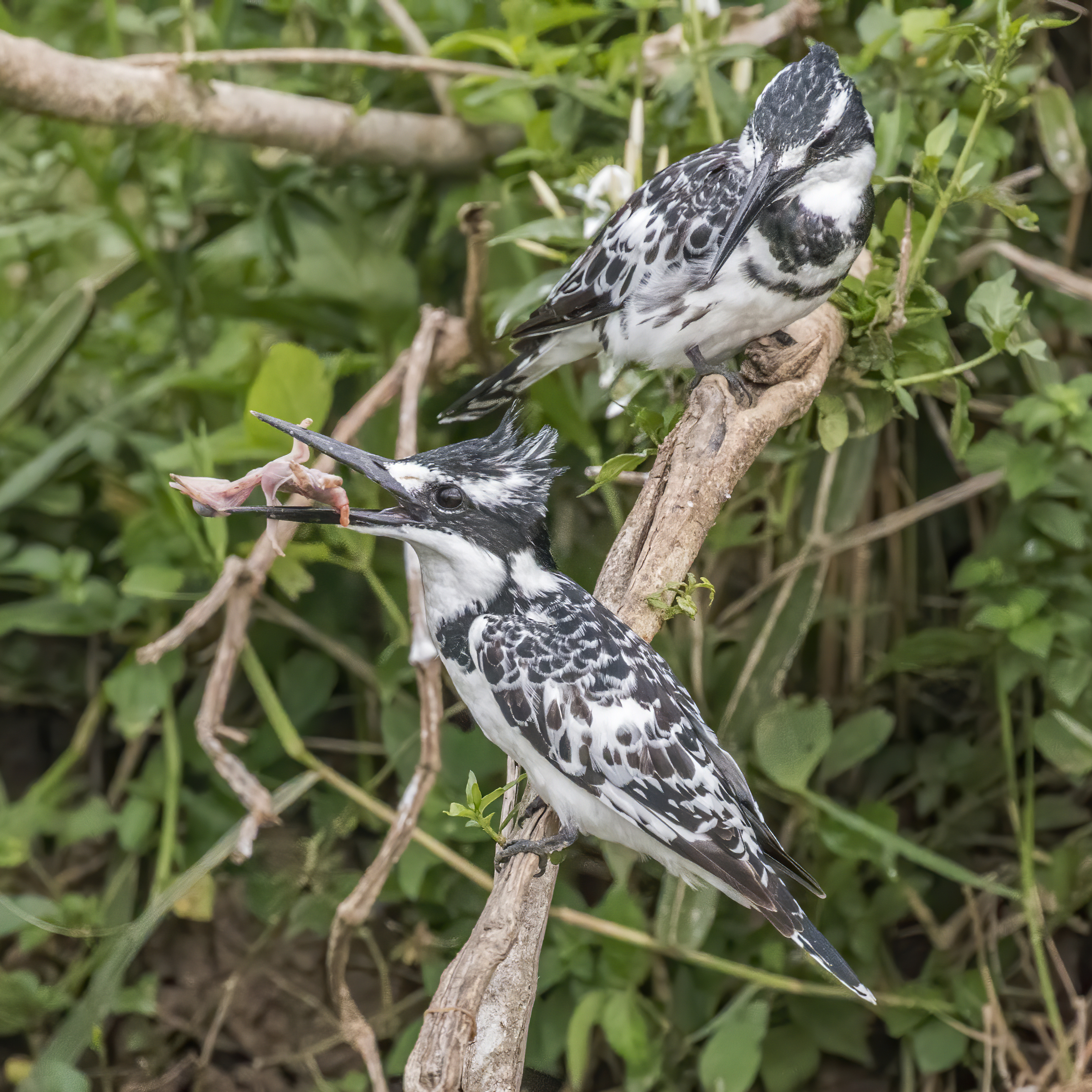
female C. r. rudis eating chick
Kazinga Channel, Uganda

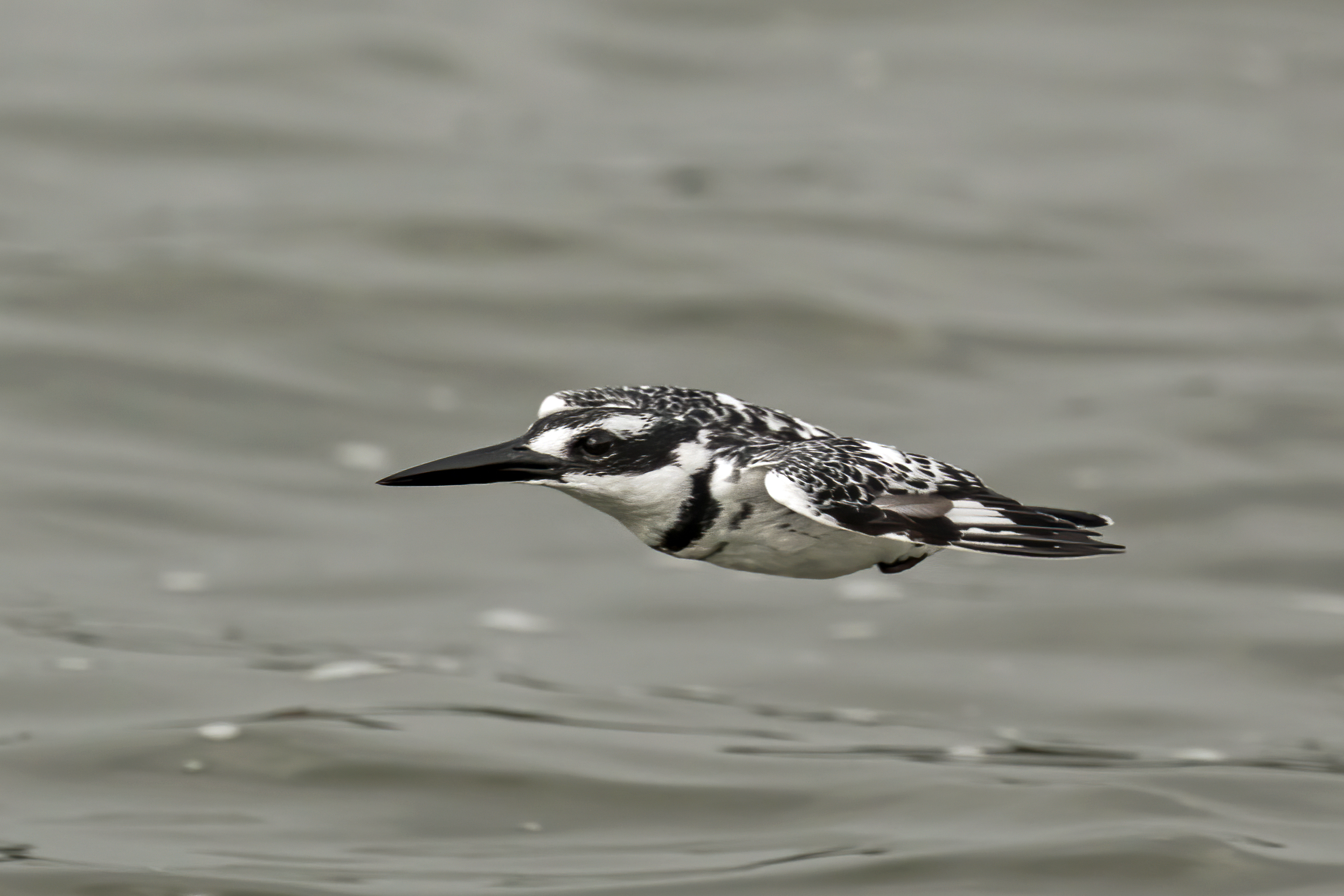
male C. r. rudis in flight
Kazinga Channel, Uganda

female C. r. rudis in flight
Egypt

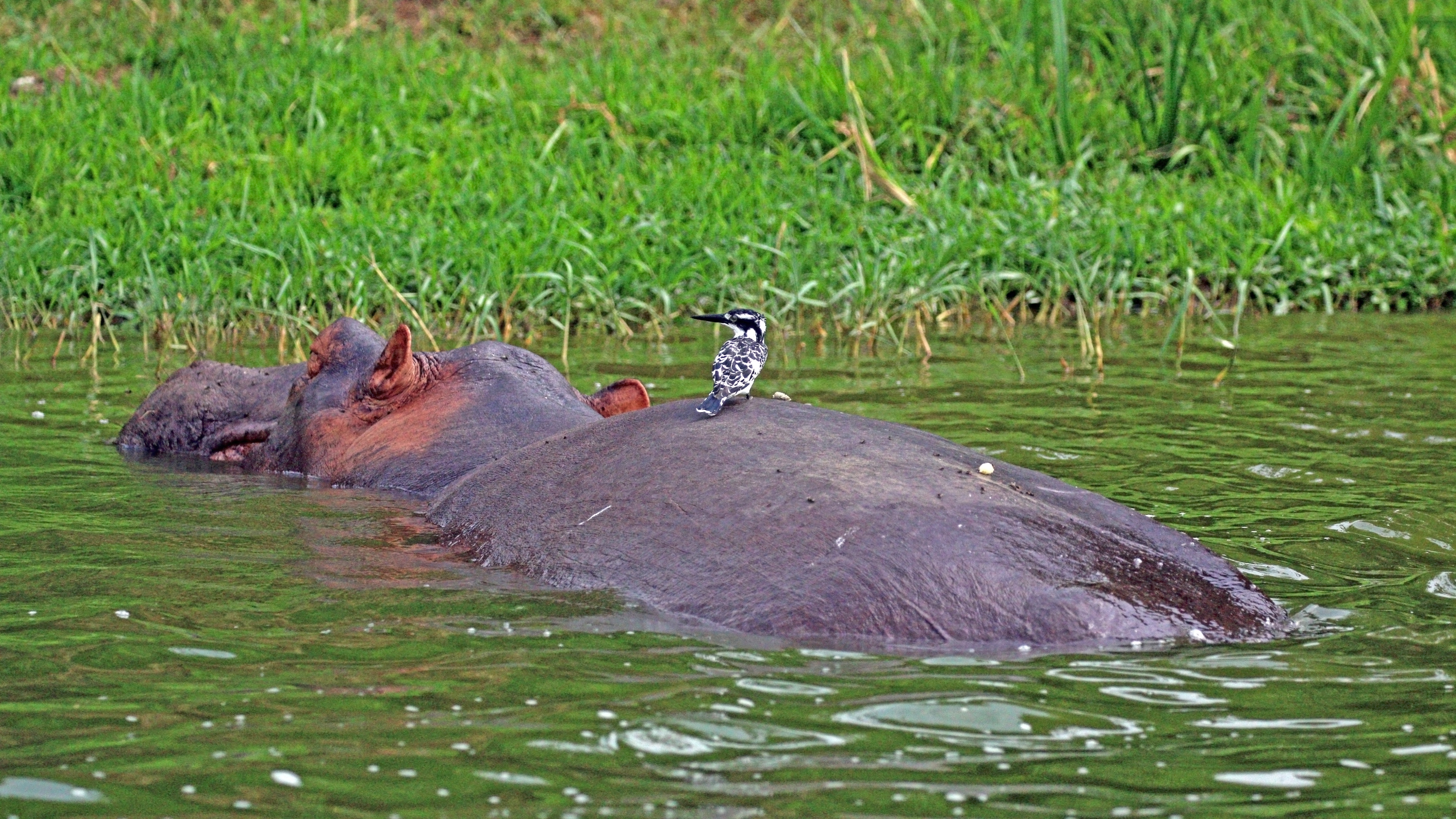
C. r. rudis on hippo
Kazinga Channel, Uganda
