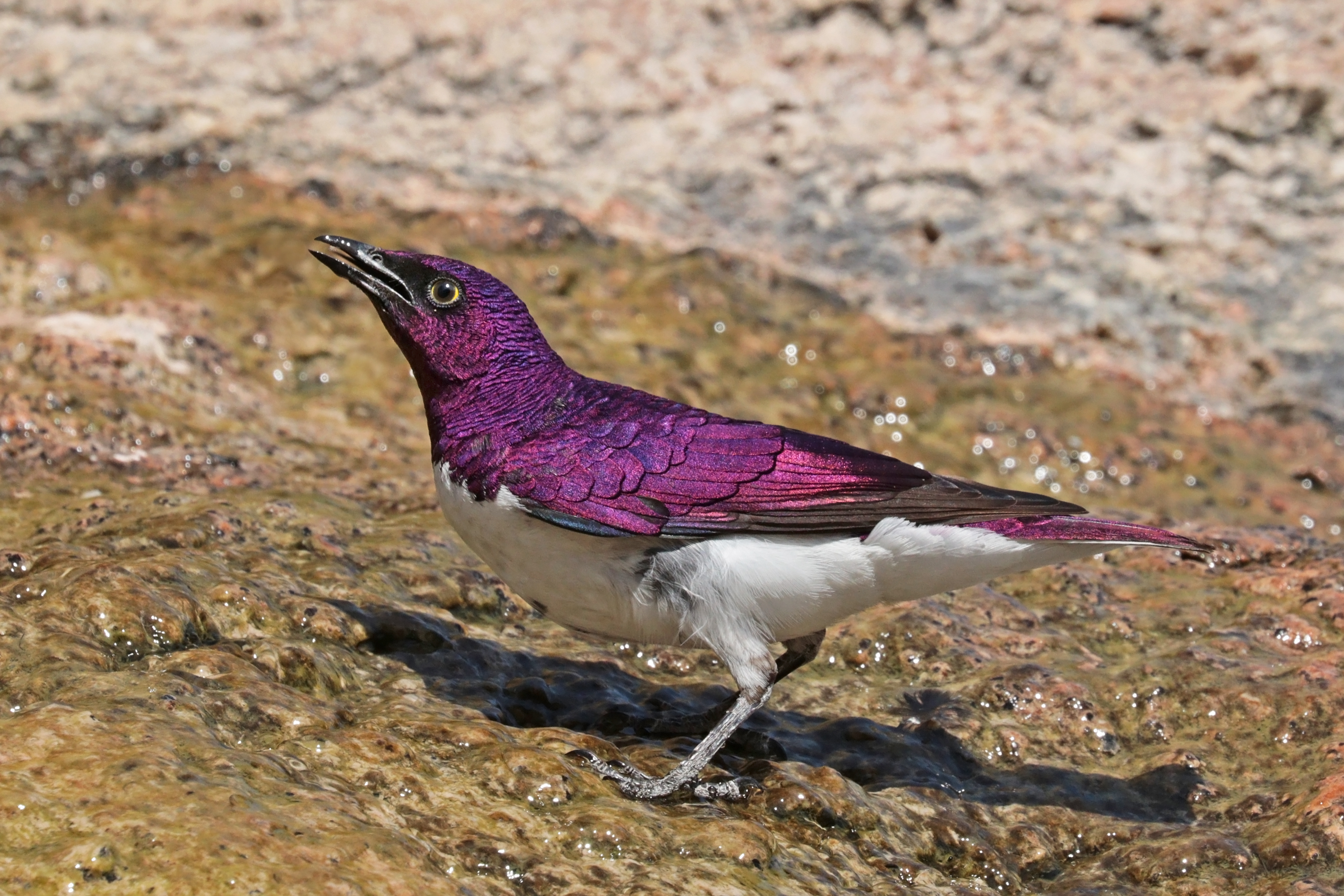
- Male
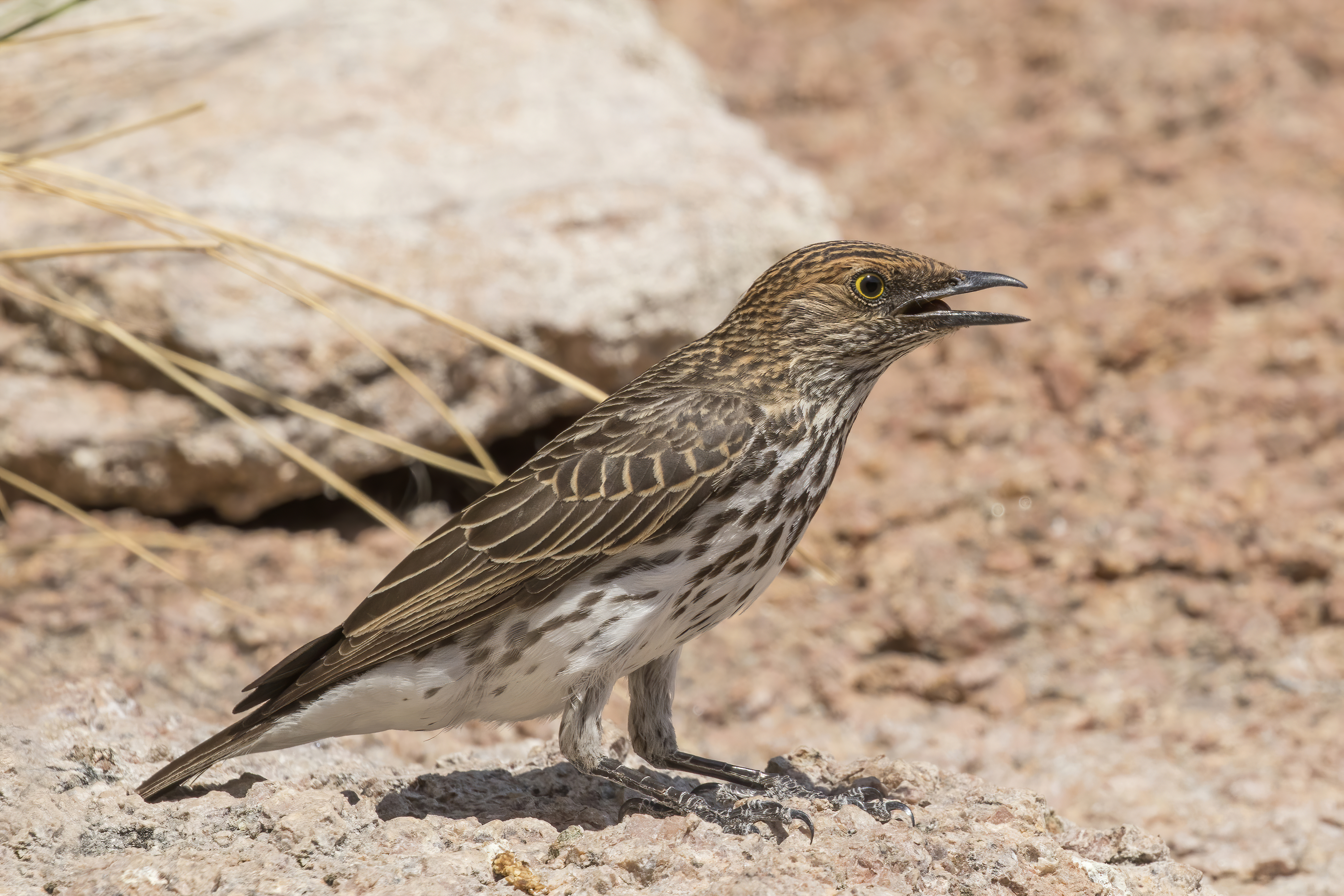
- Female both C. l. verreauxi Damaraland, Namibia

Conservation status
- Least Concern (IUCN 3.1)

Scientific classification
- Kingdom: Animalia
- Phylum: Chordata
- Class: Aves
- Order: Passeriformes
- Family: Sturnidae
- Genus: Cinnyricinclus; Lesson, 1840
- Species: C. leucogaster

Binomial name
- Cinnyricinclus leucogaster (Boddaert, 1783)

Synonyms
- Turdus leucogaster Boddaert, 1783

Audio
- Song recorded in Tanzania

= Violet-backed starling =

Species of bird

The violet-backed starling (Cinnyricinclus leucogaster), also known as the plum-coloured starling or amethyst starling, or Ndambamukula in the Venda language, is a relatively small species (17 cm) of starling in the family Sturnidae. It is the only member of the genus Cinnyricinclus. This strongly sexually dimorphic species is found widely in the woodlands and savannah forest edges of mainland sub-Saharan Africa. It is rarely seen on the ground, but instead found in trees and other locations away from the ground.

== Taxonomy ==
The violet-backed starling was described by the French polymath Georges-Louis Leclerc, Comte de Buffon in 1775 in his Histoire Naturelle des Oiseaux. The bird was also illustrated in a hand-coloured plate engraved by François-Nicolas Martinet in the Planches Enluminées D'Histoire Naturelle, which was produced under the supervision of Edme-Louis Daubenton to accompany Buffon's text. Neither the plate caption nor Buffon's description included a scientific name but in 1783 the Dutch naturalist Pieter Boddaert coined the binomial name Turdus leucogaster in his catalogue of the Planches Enluminées. The type locality is Benin in West Africa. The violet-backed starling is now the only species placed in the genus Cinnyricinclus that was introduced by French naturalist René Lesson in 1840. The violet-backed starling was designated as the type species by the English naturalist George Robert Gray in 1855.

The genus name is combines Cinnyris, a genus of sunbirds that had been introduced by the French naturalist Georges Cuvier in 1816, and the Neo-Latin cinclus, meaning "thrush". The specific leucogaster is from the Ancient Greek leukos meaning "white" and gastēr meaning "belly".

=== Subspecies ===
Three subspecies are recognised:

- C. l. leucogaster (Boddaert, 1783) – Senegal and Gambia to Ethiopia, Kenya, and Tanzania
- C. l. arabicus (Grant, CHB & Mackworth-Praed, 1942) – east Sudan to northwest Somalia, and the Arabian Peninsula
- C. l. verreauxi (Finsch & Hartlaub, 1870) – south DR Congo to west Tanzania south to Botswana, northeast South Africa, and Mozambique

== Description ==
The violet-backed starling is a sexually dimorphic species with adults reaching a length of about 18 cm (7 in). The male has an iridescent violet head and back, and pure white underparts. The female has a thrush-like appearance with brown, boldly-streaked upper parts and white, heavily-streaked underparts. Both sexes have yellow irises, and black bills and legs.

== Distribution and habitat ==
The violet-backed starling is a common bird in Sub-Saharan Africa, occurring in most locations with the exception of the dense rainforest of the Congo Basin, and the more arid parts of southwestern Africa. It is found in open woodland, gallery forests, forest verges and clearings. In the Chyulu Hills of Kenya, it occurs at altitudes up to 2,100 m (6,900 ft).

== Behaviour ==
The diet of the violet-backed starling includes fruits, seeds and arthropods. It sometimes hawks for insects in a manner similar to flycatchers. It largely feeds in the canopy, seldom foraging on the ground. The nest is usually located in a crevice in a tree within a few metres of the ground. Nesting material includes green leaves and dung. The female will incubate the clutch of two to four eggs, which are pale blue with reddish-brown spots, for 12–14 days. The male will help feed chicks until they fledge after about 21 days.

== Gallery ==
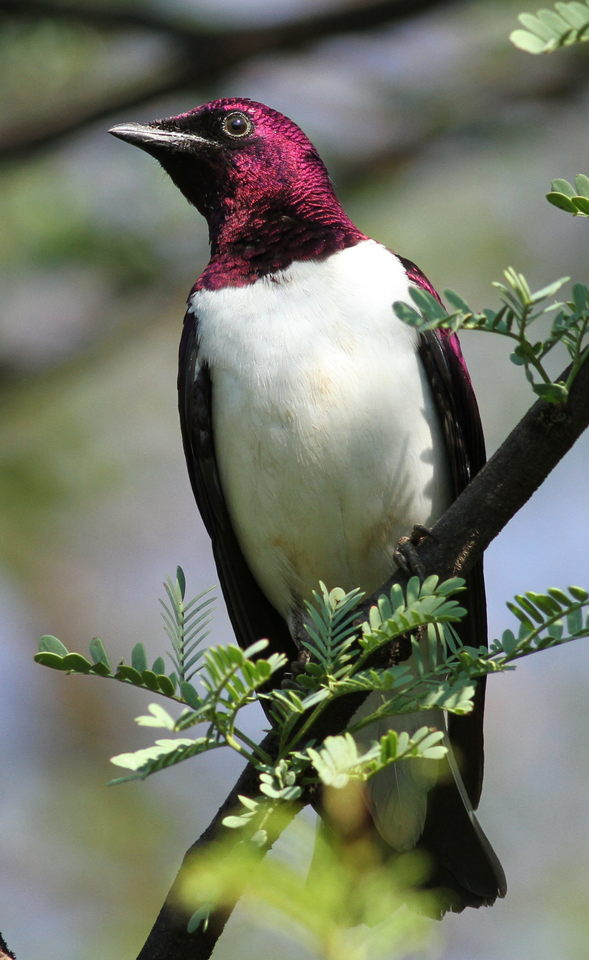
Male violet-backed starling, Pilanesberg NP, South Africa

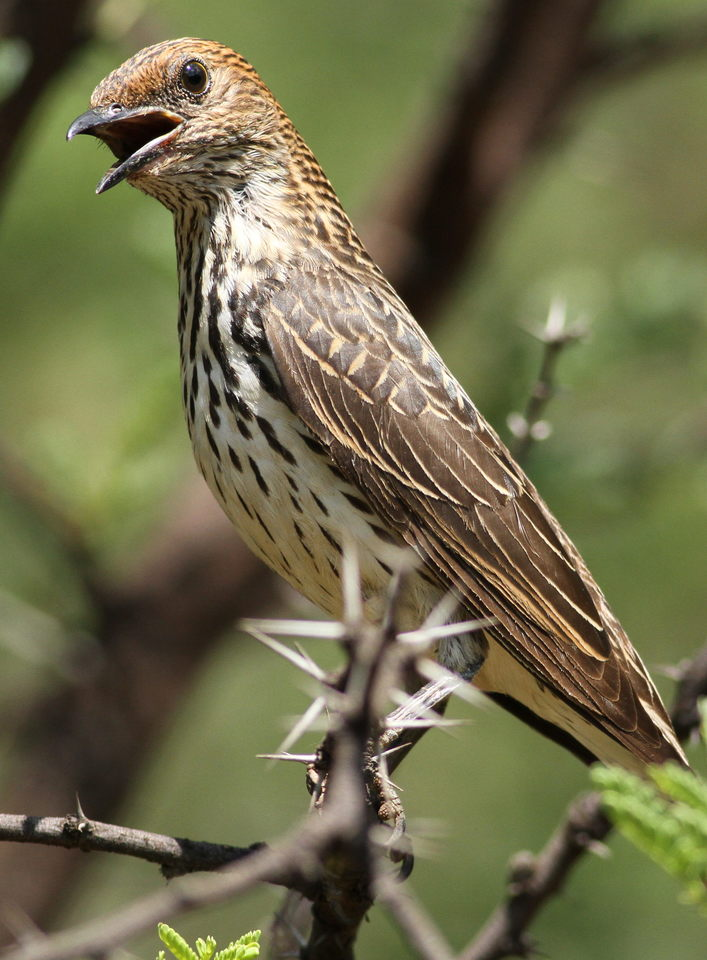
Female violet-backed starling, Pilanesberg NP, South Africa
