= Elands River (North West) =

- Location of the Elands River mouth
- Etymology: Named after the Common Eland (Taurotragus oryx)
- Native name: Tswana: Kgetleng

Location
- Country: South Africa
- Province: North West
- Cities: Swartruggens, Sun City

Physical characteristics
- Source
  - location: West of Koster
  - elevation: 1,650 m (5,410 ft)
- Mouth: Crocodile River (West)
  - location: Near Vaalkop Dam
  - coordinates: 25°27′51″S 26°45′24″E
  - elevation: 971 m (3,186 ft)

Basin features
- Tributaries
  - right: Koster River, Selons River, Hex River

The Elands River (Tswana: Kgetleng, Afrikaans: Elandsrivier) is located in the North West Province, South Africa. It is a tributary of the Crocodile River, part of the Limpopo River basin.

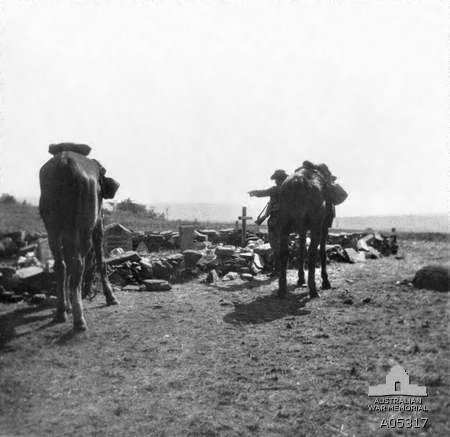
A soldier from the 3rd New South Wales Bushmen contingent at Elands River in 1901, one year after the battle

== Course ==
The Elands River originates west of Koster, North West Province, flowing northwards across Swartruggens into the Lindleyspoort Dam. A few kilometers downstream from the dam wall it bends eastwards east of Silwerkrans and goes meandering in an ENE direction across the veld for many kilometres. Further east it flows right south of the Pilanesberg, barely 1.5 km from the outer perimeter of the ancient crater formation.

The Elands continues flowing eastward to the Vaalkop Dam. Finally, about 5 km downstream, it joins the Crocodile River's left bank. Its main tributaries are the Koster River, Selons River and Hex River, the latter joining its right bank at the Vaalkop Reservoir.

There is much platinum mining, including its related elements palladium, rhodium, ruthenium, iridium and osmium, in the Elands River basin, as well as the gold, nickel and copper present in the ores. The only major city in the area is Rustenburg. Sun City is located between the Elands River and the Pilanesberg mountain.

== History ==
This river is famous for the Battle of Elands River of the Second Anglo-Boer War. It was fought in 1900 between a force of 2,000 to 3,000 Boers who attacked a garrison of 500 Australian, Rhodesian, Canadian and British soldiers who were posted at a supply dump in Brakfontein Drift. The battle took place at point close to the river along the supply route between Rustenburg and Zeerust.

== Dams in the river ==
- Lindleyspoort Dam
- Vaalkop Dam
