= Vaalkop Dam =

- Interactive map of Vaalkop Dam
- Official name: Vaalkop Dam
- Location: North West, South Africa
- Coordinates: 25°18′37″S 27°28′33″E
- Opening date: 1972 (renovated 2008)
- Operators: Department of Water Affairs and Forestry

Dam and spillways
- Type of dam: gravity & earth-fill
- Impounds: Elands River and Hex River
- Height: 33 metres (108 ft)
- Length: 2,491 metres (8,173 ft)

Reservoir
- Creates: Vaalkop Dam Reservoir
- Total capacity: 53,500,000 cubic metres (1.89×10^{9} cu ft)
- Catchment area: 6 115 km^{2}
- Surface area: 1,110.5 hectares (2,744 acres)

The Vaalkop Dam is a combined gravity and earth-fill type dam located in North West Province, South Africa. Its reservoir is located at the confluence of the Elands River and the Hex River, part of the Crocodile basin. The dam was established originally in 1972 and was renovated in 2008 in order to supply water for the platinum and associated metals mining operations in the area. The dam mainly serves for irrigation purposes, municipal water supply and industrial uses. The hazard potential of the dam has been ranked high.

The Vaalkop Dam lies near Pilanesberg, 23 km (14 mi) ESE from the outer perimeter of the ancient crater formation.

== See also ==
- List of reservoirs and dams in South Africa
