= Pilanesberg =

Ancient volcanic structure in South Africa

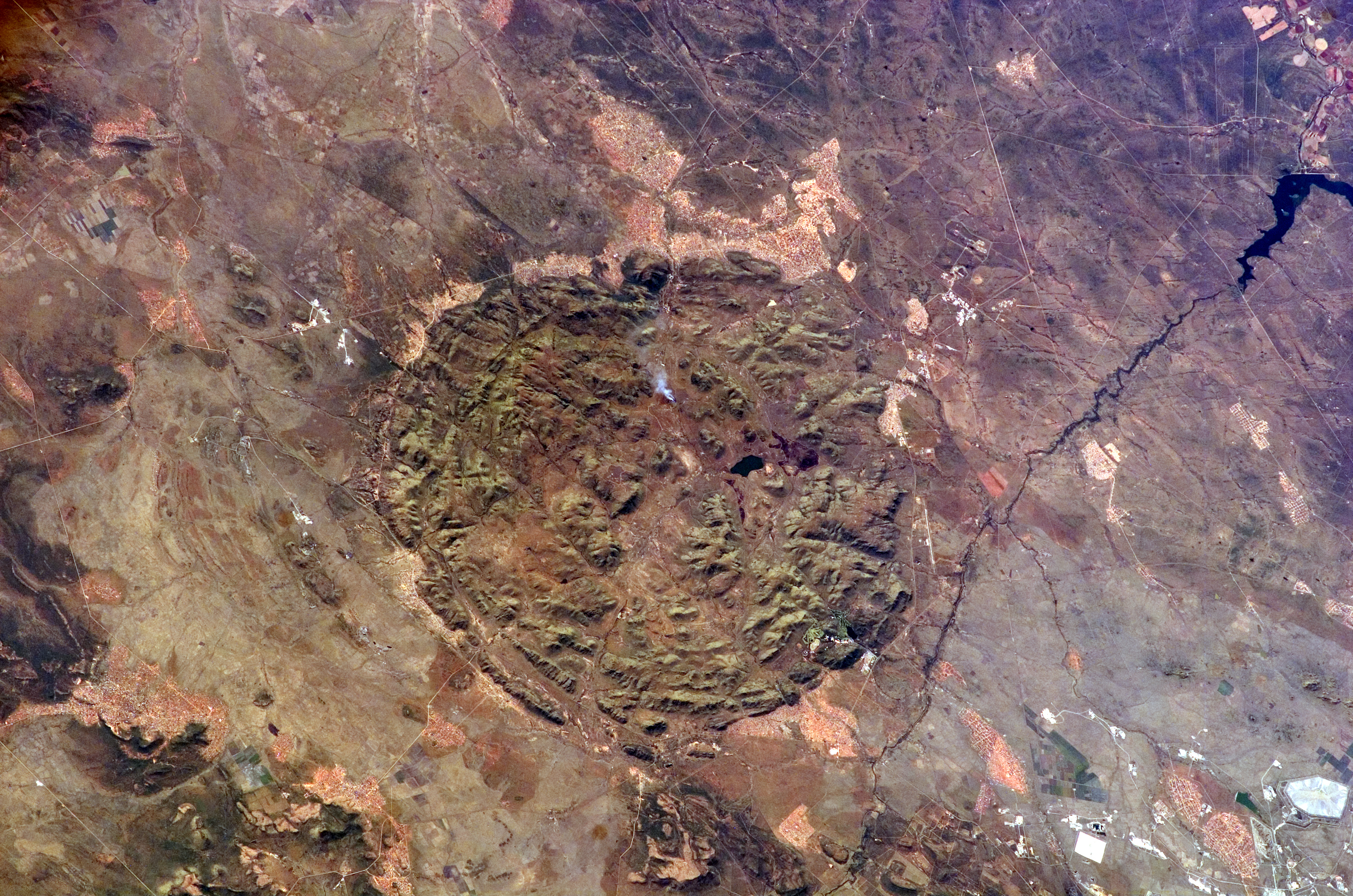
- NASA picture of Pilanesberg with Vaalkop Dam on the right side

Highest point
- Elevation: 1,687 m (5,535 ft)
- Listing: List of mountains in South Africa
- Coordinates: 25°14′25″S 27°4′33″E

Geography
- Location within South Africa
- Location: North West Province
- Parent range: Witwatersrand

Geology
- Rock age: Proterozoic
- Mountain type: Extinct volcano

The Pilanesberg (formerly Pilandsberg) is a mountain in the North West Province, South Africa. The mountain is an ancient volcanic structure, circular in shape, that rises from flat surrounding plains. It is formed by three concentric ridges or rings of hills, of which the outermost has a diameter of about 24 km. The Pilanesberg is located 100 km to the North-West of Pretoria and is for the greater part enclosed in a protected area known as Pilanesberg National Park.

The Elands River flows South of the Pilanesberg in an Easterly direction. There are a number of platinum mines at the perimeter of the crater formation.

The name "Pilanes" comes from a historic Tswana chief named Pilane.

== Geology ==
Although geographically located within the Witwatersrand range, the mountain is geologically part of a feature known as the Pilanesberg Alkaline Ring Complex. It is a vast ring dike of a very ancient extinct volcano that last erupted some 1,200 million years ago.

The Pilanesberg is one of the largest volcanic complexes of its type; there are few similar alkaline volcanic structures in the world. Different types of syenites, including a number of rare minerals, occur in the crater area.

At its zenith, the volcano towered 7,000 metres in height. Over time, a series of volcanic eruptions occurred. There were further outpourings of lava, craters collapsed, ring fracturing took place around the volcano and magma was squeezed into these fractures. The result is several "onion rings" of rock of different ages. Erosion over many millions of years has stripped away the mountain and the highest peak. What we see today is not so much a volcanic crater, but a cross section through the magma pipes that were located at great depth below the mountain.

== See also ==
- Pilanesberg National Park
- Pilanesberg International Airport
- Sun City
