= Lindleyspoort Dam =

- Interactive map of Lindleyspoort Dam
- Official name: Lindleyspoort Dam
- Location: North West, South Africa
- Coordinates: 25°29′0″S 26°41′7″E
- Opening date: 1943 (renovated: 1968)
- Operators: Department of Water Affairs and Forestry

Dam and spillways
- Type of dam: concrete arch
- Impounds: Elands River
- Height: 37.8 m
- Length: 177 m

Reservoir
- Creates: Lindleyspoort Dam Reservoir
- Total capacity: 14 381 000 m³
- Catchment area: 704 km^{2}
- Surface area: 180.1 ha

Lindleyspoort Dam is a concrete arch type dam located on the Elands River, near Swartruggens, North West, South Africa. It was constructed in 1943 and renovated in 1968. The main purpose of the dam is to provide irrigation. Its hazard potential has been ranked high (3).

== See also ==
- List of reservoirs and dams in South Africa
- List of rivers of South Africa
