= Pilanesberg International Airport =

Pilanesberg International Airport Pilanesberg Internasionale Lughawe
- IATA: NTY; ICAO: FAPN

Summary
- Airport type: Public
- Owner/Operator: North West Provincial Government (NWPG) (2011–present); Airports Company South Africa (Until 2011)
- Serves: Sun City, North West, South Africa
- Elevation AMSL: 3,412 ft (1,040 m)
- Coordinates: 25°20′01″S 027°10′24″E
- Website: acsa.co.za

Map
- Location of airport in North West province Location of North West in South Africa

Runways
Direction	Length		Surface
Direction	m	ft	Surface
05/23	2,750	9,022	Asphalt
- Sources: South African AIP, DAFIF

Pilanesberg International Airport (IATA: NTY, ICAO: FAPN) was an airport serving Sun City in the North West province of South Africa. It is located adjacent to the Pilanesberg National Park. The airport was severely damaged during a fire in August 2023.

== Facilities ==
The airport resides at an elevation of 3,412 feet (1,040 m) above mean sea level. It has one runway designated 05/23 with an asphalt surface measuring 2,750 by 30 metres (9,022 ft × 98 ft).

== Communication ==
The Communication Frequency for Pilanesberg International Airport is 118.40 MHz. Runway lights can be activated by making 3-7 clicks on 118.40 MHz. The control tower can be contacted on +27 (0)14 55 22154.

== Recent history ==
The airport's main terminal building as well as the airport's manager's office and boardroom were destroyed during a fire on 29 August 2023, which halted all commercial operations at the airport.

On 20 February 2026, the North West provincial government and the Department of Public Works and Infrastructure signed a Memorandum of understanding to rebuild the airport.

== Nearby airports ==
- Lanseria International Airport
- Rustenburg Airfield

== See also ==
- Pilanesberg
- Pilanesberg National Park
- Sun City
