= Barseba =

- Location within North West (South African province) Location within South Africa
- Coordinates: 25.551°S 27.532°E
- Country: South Africa
- Province: North West
- District: Bojanala
- Municipality: Rustenburg

Area
  - Total: 2.22 km^{2} (0.86 sq mi)

Population (2001)
  - Total: 1,572
  - Density: 708/km^{2} (1,830/sq mi)
- Time zone: UTC+2 (SAST)

Barseba is a village in Bojanala District Municipality in the North West province of South Africa.
