= Pilanesberg National Park =

Wildlife reserve in an extinct volcano in South Africa

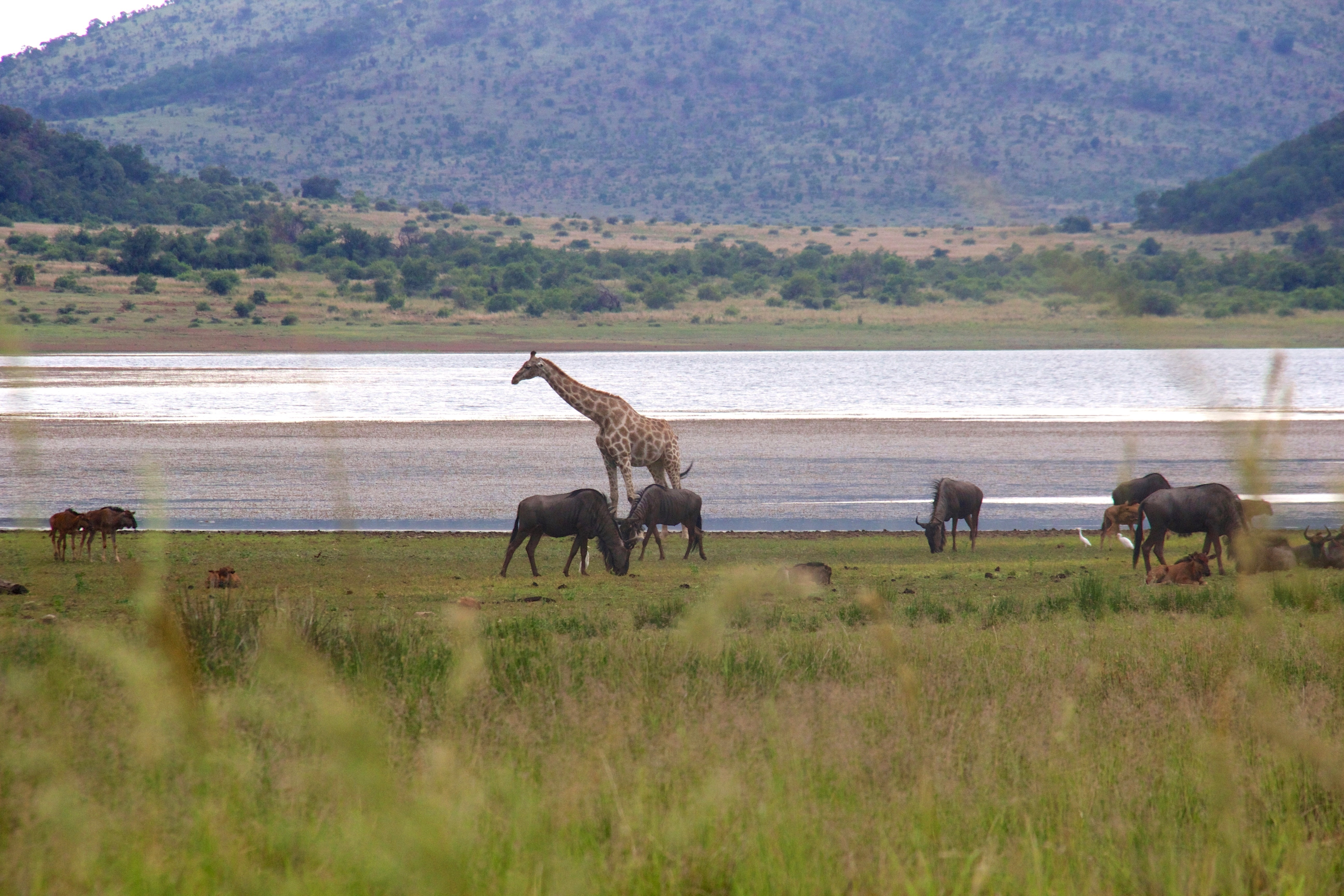
- South African giraffe and blue wildebeest at Mankwe Dam
- Location in the North West province
- Location: Pilanesberg, Bojanala Municipality, North West Province, South Africa
- Nearest city: Sun City, South Africa
- Coordinates: 25°15′40″S 27°06′03″E
- Area: 572 square kilometres (221 sq mi)
- Established: 1 April 1984; 42 years ago
- Administrator: North West Parks and Tourism Board
- Website: Pilanesberg National Park
- Pilanesberg National Park (South Africa) Pilanesberg National Park (North West (South African province))

Pilanesberg National Park is a national park in North West Province South Africa. Established in 1979 following a rehabilitation project, Operation Genesis, under which several wildlife species were introduced. It constitutes the fourth biggest protected area in South Africa, and has become a popular destination due to its proximity to Gauteng. The park is administered by the North West Parks and Tourism Board, while concessionaires operate its rest camps, bush lodges and lodges. In the south it borders the Sun City entertainment complex.

Pilanesberg National Park encompasses the root zone of a 1.25 billion year old extinct volcano, which is now defined by alternating ridges and valleys forming concentric rings. The geological formation rises abruptly in the form of hills 300–600 m (980–1,970 ft) above the surrounding bushveld plains.

Scattered throughout the park are various sites assigned to the Iron and Stone Age and illustrate the presence of humans during these early periods.

== History ==
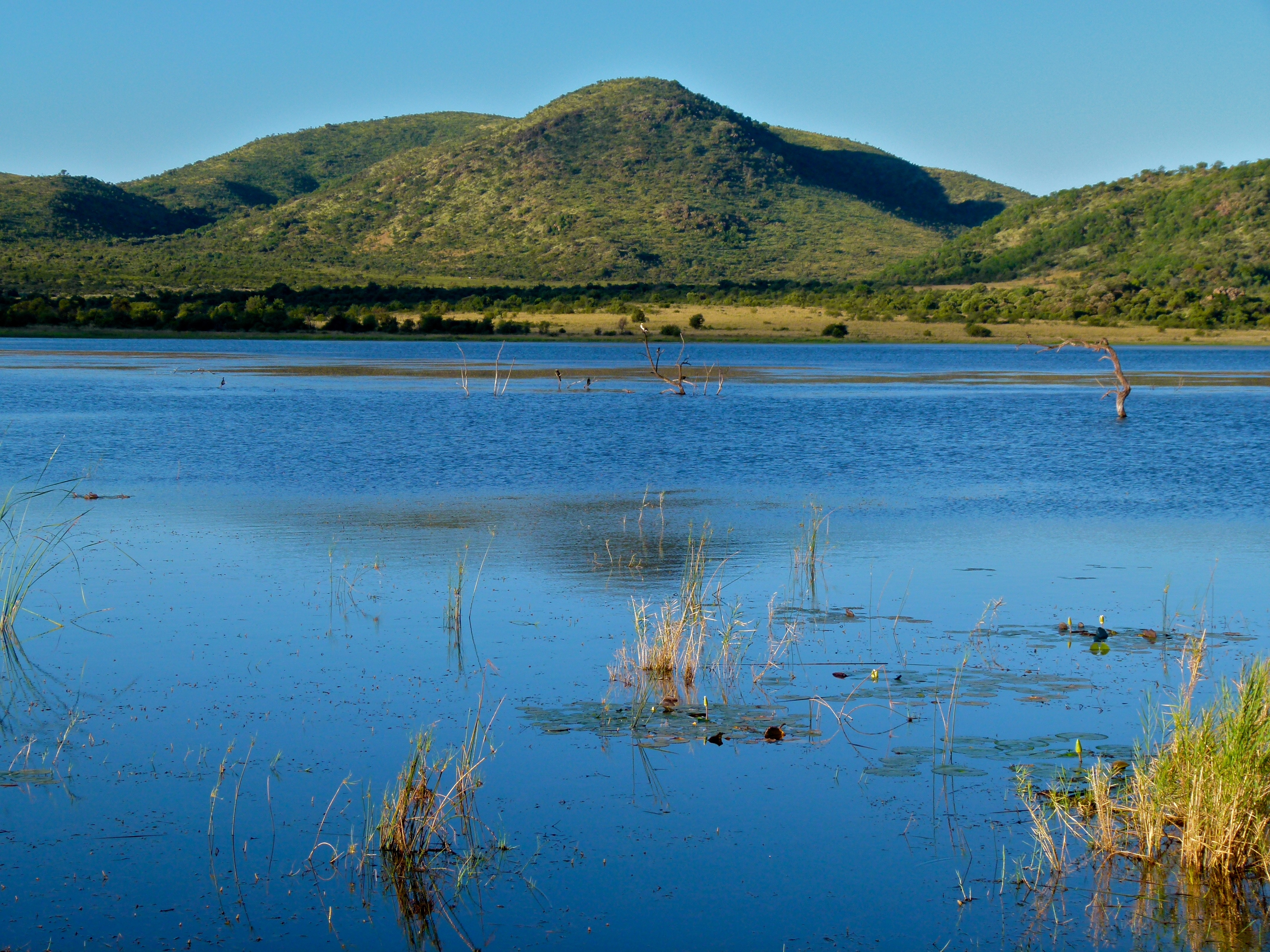
View from the bird hide at the Mankwe Dam

=== Tswana period ===
Major Tswana towns were established during the late 18th century. Most of these towns were destroyed during the Difaqane wars that raged in the Pilanesberg/Magaliesberg region in the late 1820s, when Mzilikazi occupied the region. The towns were destroyed, South Ndebele people ruled over the area during the period. The Pilanesberg is named after chief Pilane of the Kgafêla people, who ruled from Bogopane, Mmamodimokwana and eventually Mmasebudule during the 1800s.

== Geography ==
The 'Pilanesberg Alkaline Ring Complex' is the park's primary geological feature. Ring dikes fed a completely eroded caldera created by volcanic eruptions between 1.25 and 1.4 billion years ago. It is one of the largest volcanic complexes of its type in the world, and rare rock types and minerals make it globally distinguished. Pilanesberg National Park covers an area of 572 km^{2} (221 sq mi).

The northern section has the highest hills, with Matlhorwe's peaks reaching 1,687 and 1,670 m (5,535 and 5,479 ft) respectively. Somewhat southward are Marutlhare, Ratshwane and Lenong (eagle hill), the latter offering views of the surrounding land from four different lookout points. Bakenkop (1,455 m (4,774 ft)), Thabayadiotso, the "proud mountain", Thaba ya Ditshwene, the "mountain of baboons", Dithabaneng (1,416 m (4,646 ft)) and Nkakane (1,382 m (4,534 ft)) are nestled in the eastern section. The southern hills are Madapya (1,455 m (4,774 ft)), Magare (1,455 m (4,774 ft)), Masebudule (1,455 m (4,774 ft)), Maritane and Bopitikwe.

=== Climate ===
The climate of Pilanesberg National Park is subtropical with dry winters and hot summers, a hot semi-arid climate (Köppen Cwa). The rainy season is from October to April, and the dry season from May to September.

Climate data for Kwa Maritane Lodge
Month	Jan	Feb	Mar	Apr	May	Jun	Jul	Aug	Sep	Oct	Nov	Dec	Year
Mean daily maximum °C (°F)	32 (90)	32 (90)	30 (86)	27 (81)	23 (73)	20 (68)	19 (66)	22 (72)	26 (79)	29 (84)	29 (84)	30 (86)	33 (91)
Daily mean °C (°F)	23.0 (73.4)	22.8 (73.0)	21.3 (70.3)	18.3 (64.9)	15.2 (59.4)	12.4 (54.3)	12.1 (53.8)	15.6 (60.1)	19.7 (67.5)	22.2 (72.0)	22.7 (72.9)	23.0 (73.4)	19.0 (66.2)
Mean daily minimum °C (°F)	15 (59)	15 (59)	13 (55)	10 (50)	6 (43)	3 (37)	5 (41)	8 (46)	12 (54)	15 (59)	16 (61)	16 (61)	14 (57)
Average precipitation mm (inches)	119 (4.7)	101 (4.0)	81 (3.2)	49 (1.9)	18 (0.7)	9 (0.4)	6 (0.2)	6 (0.2)	16 (0.6)	56 (2.2)	87 (3.4)	—	—

== Biodiversity ==
=== Vegetation ===
The terrain lies in the transition zone between Kalahari and bushveld, and both types of vegetation occur. As a result of the park being in a transition zone, there are overlaps in mammals, birds, and vegetation.

=== Fauna ===
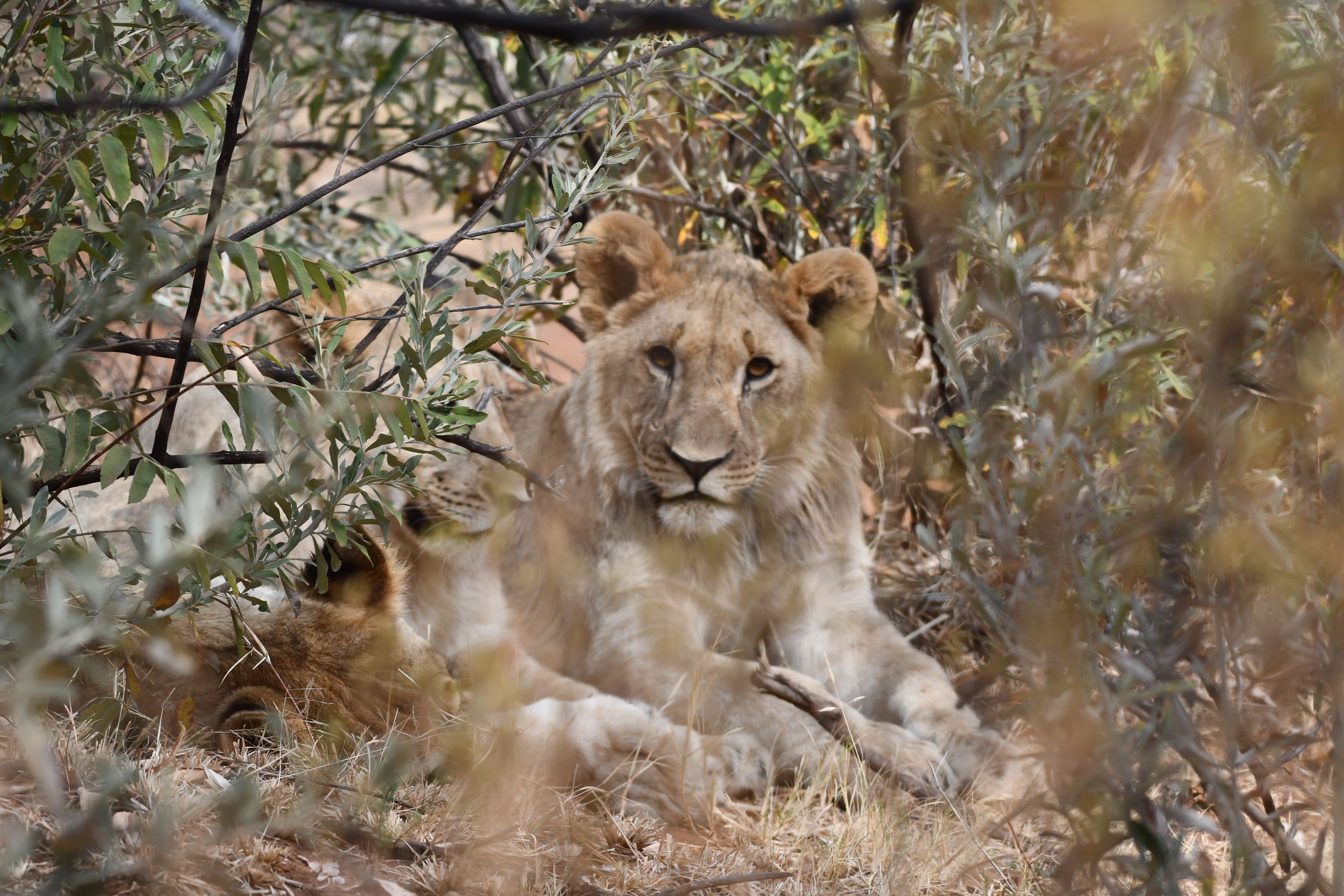
Cubs of a resting lion pride

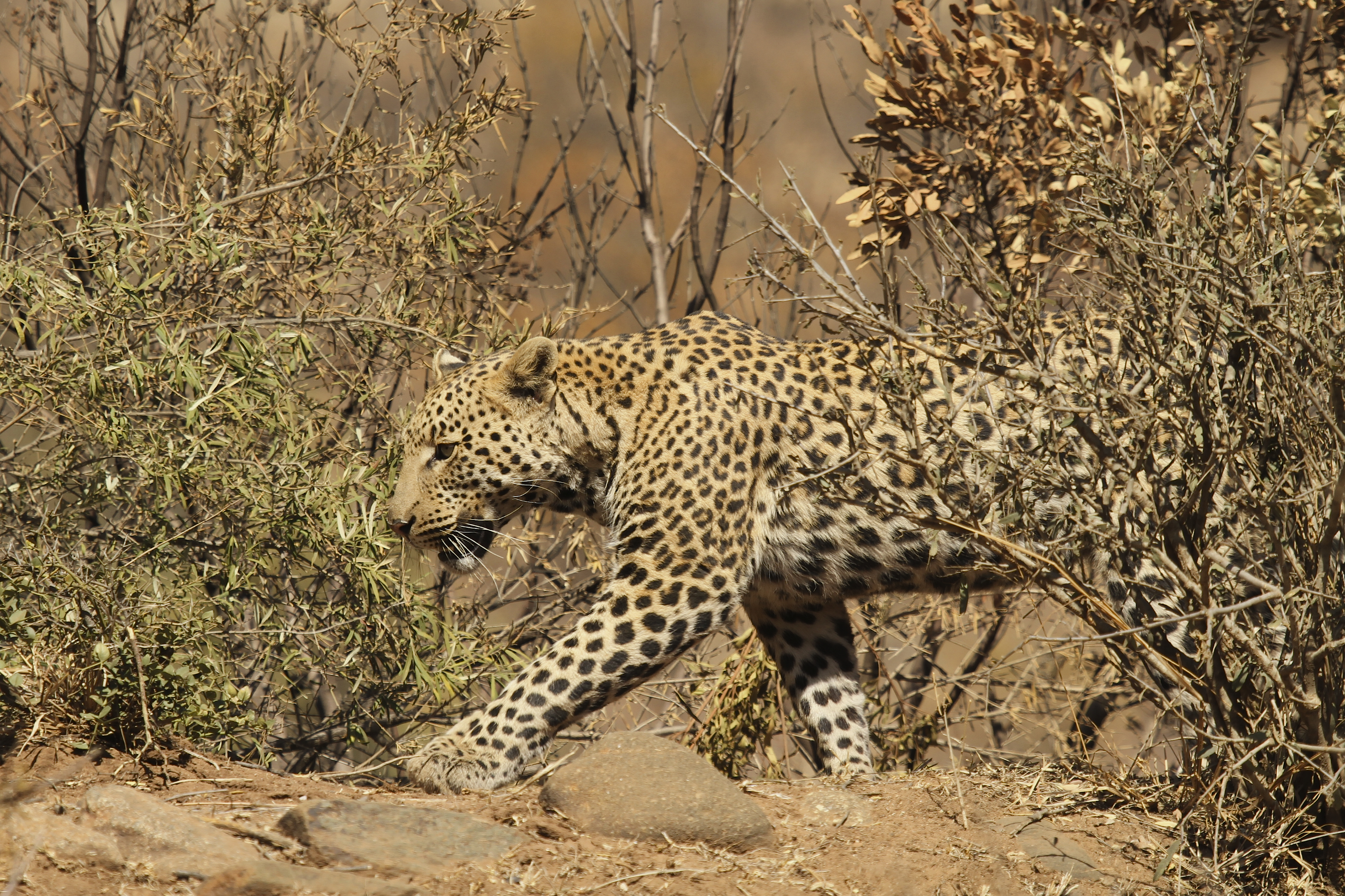
African leopard at Kubu drive

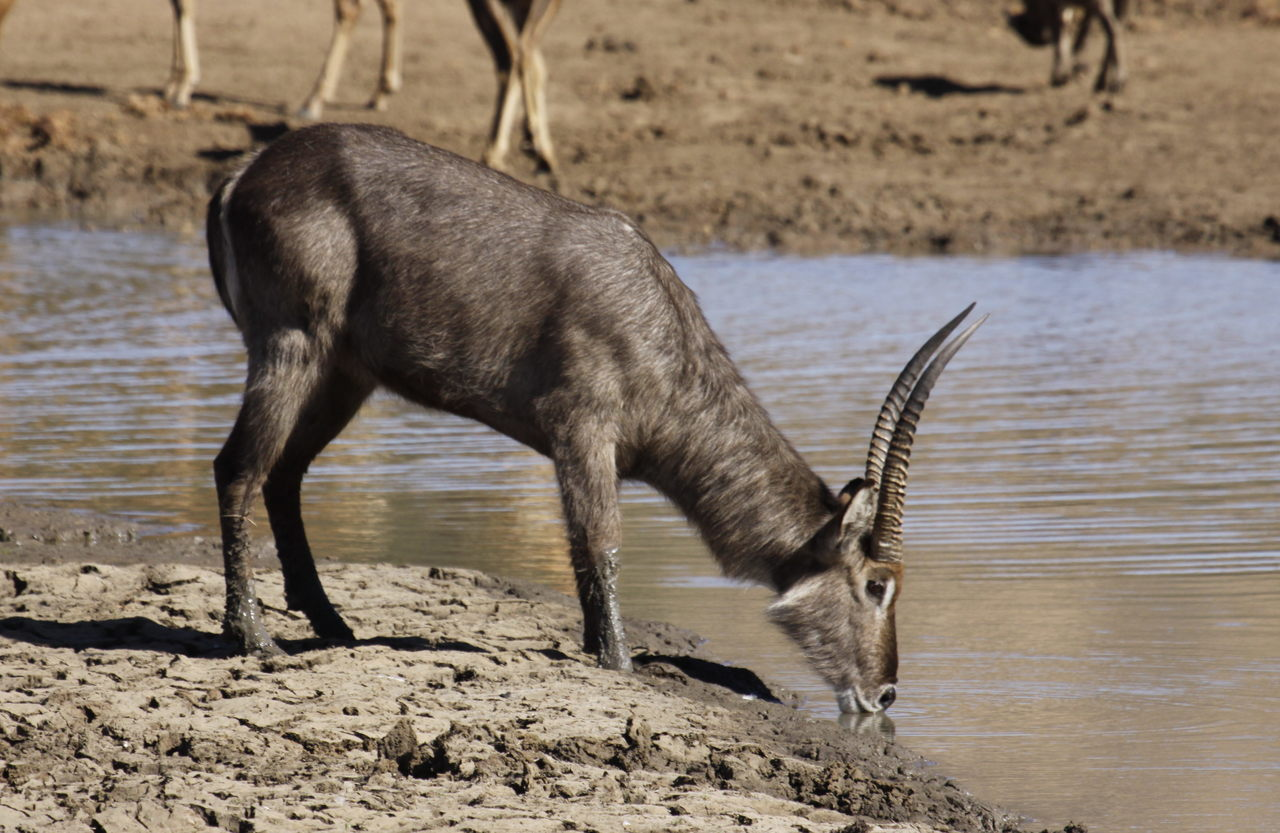
Waterbuck drinking

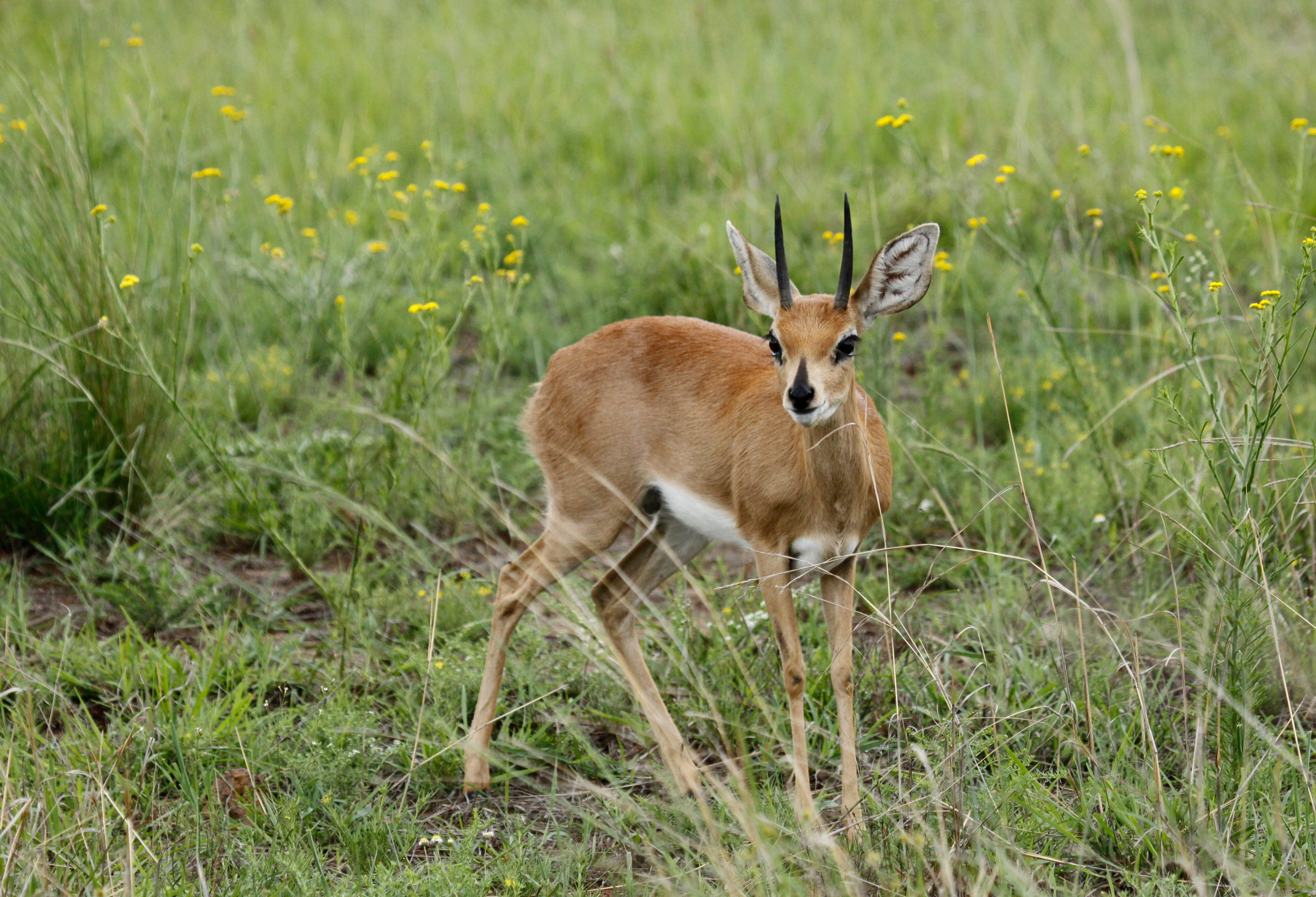
Steenbok in open veld

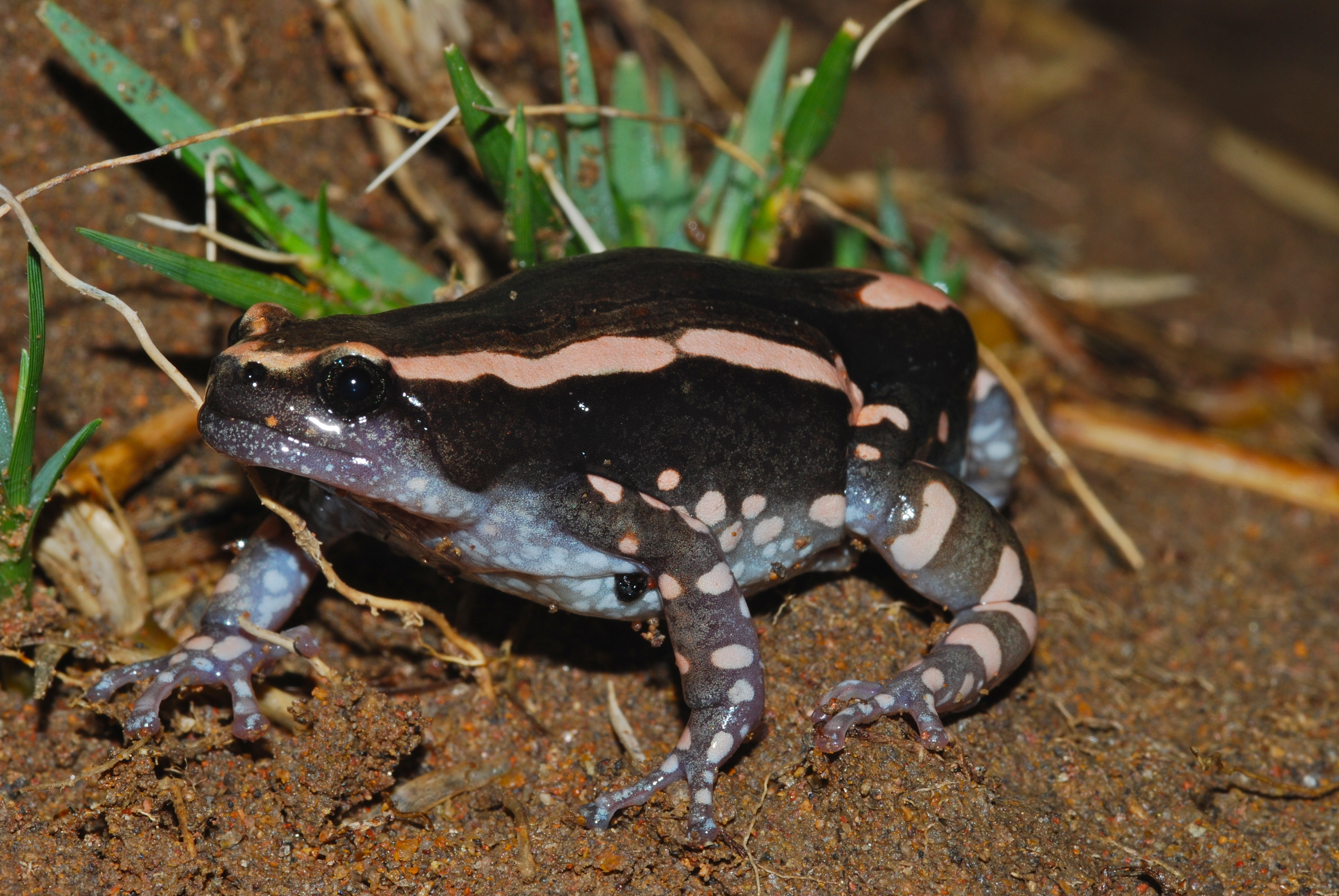
Banded rubber frog strolling at night

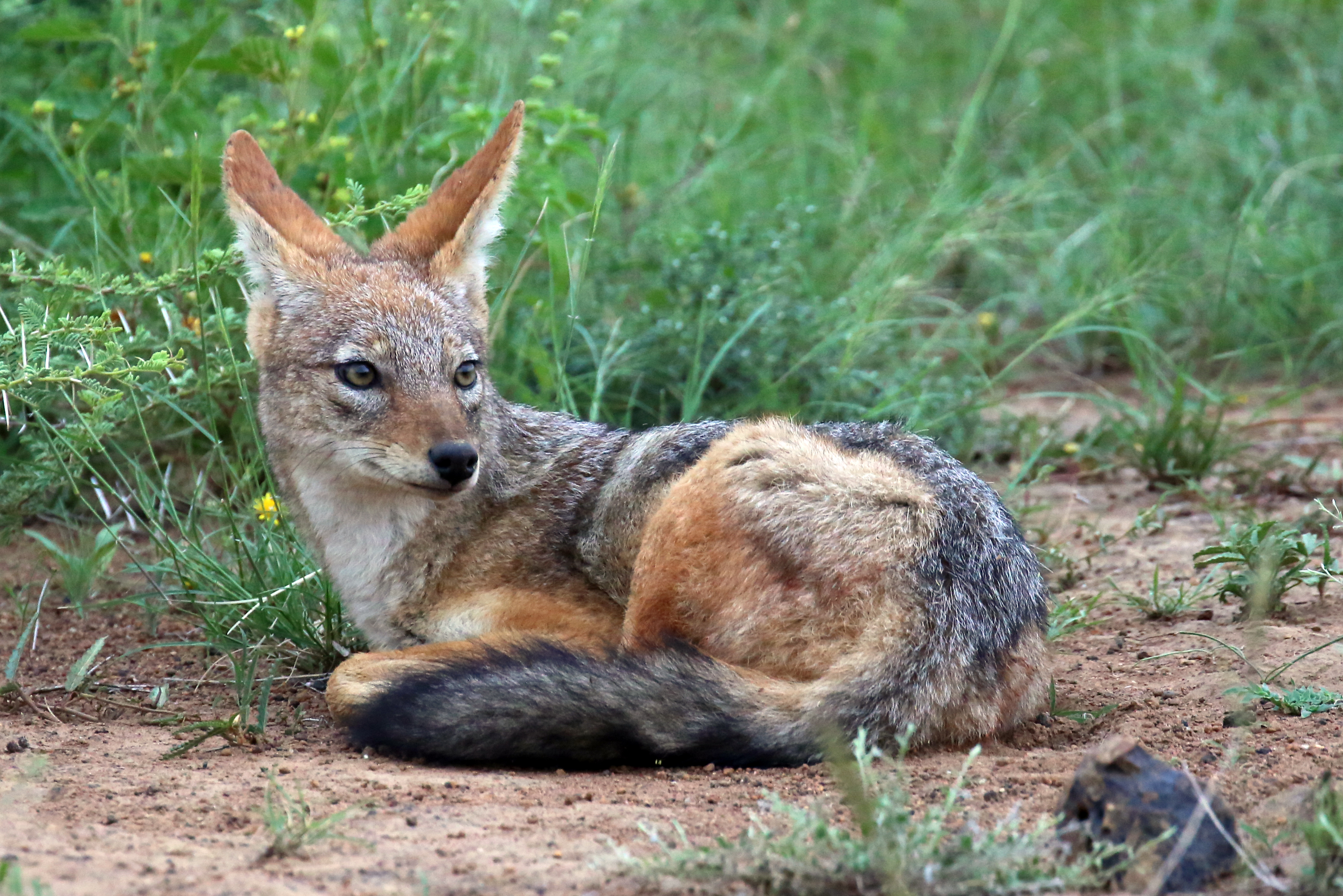
Black-backed jackal

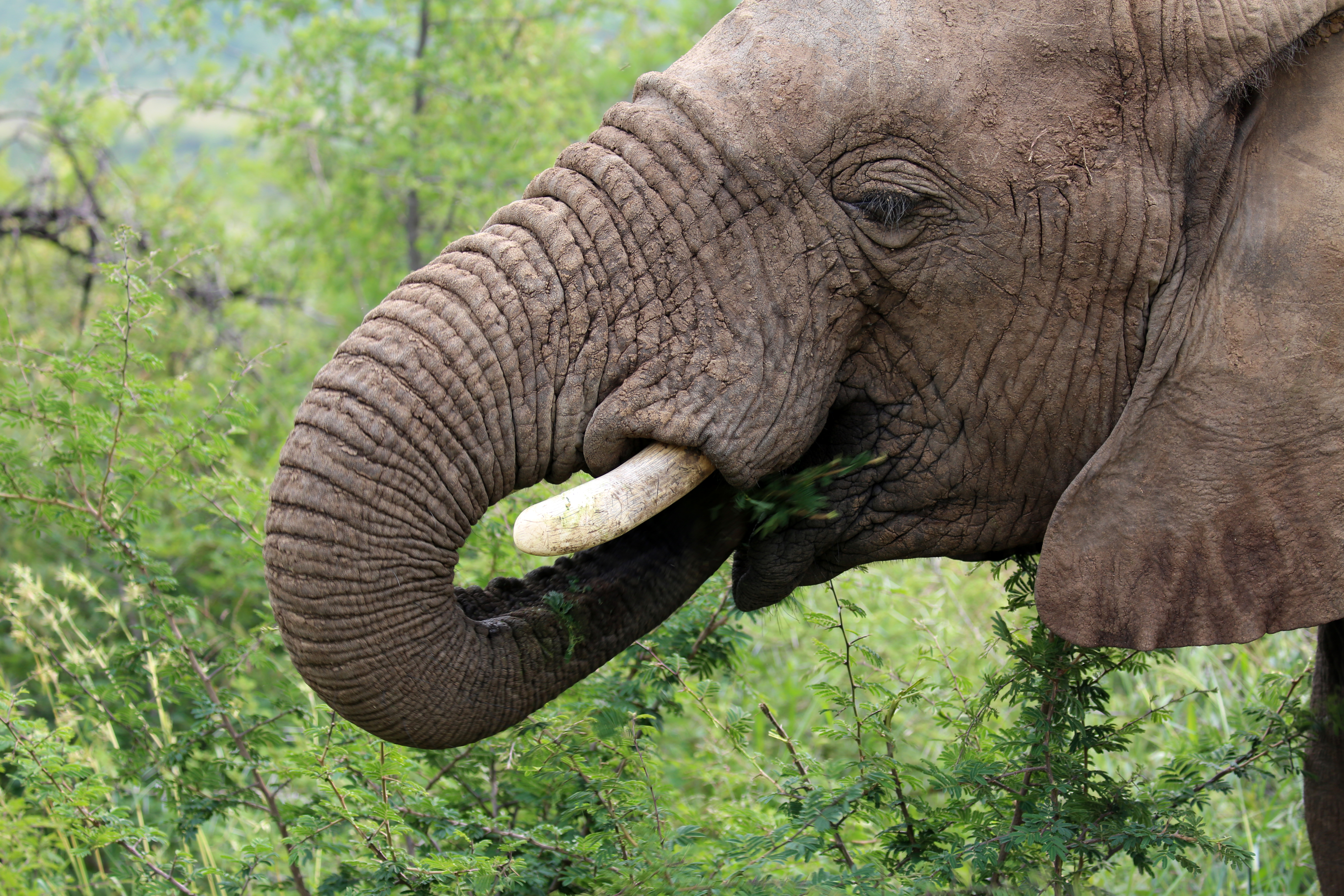
African bush elephant feeding

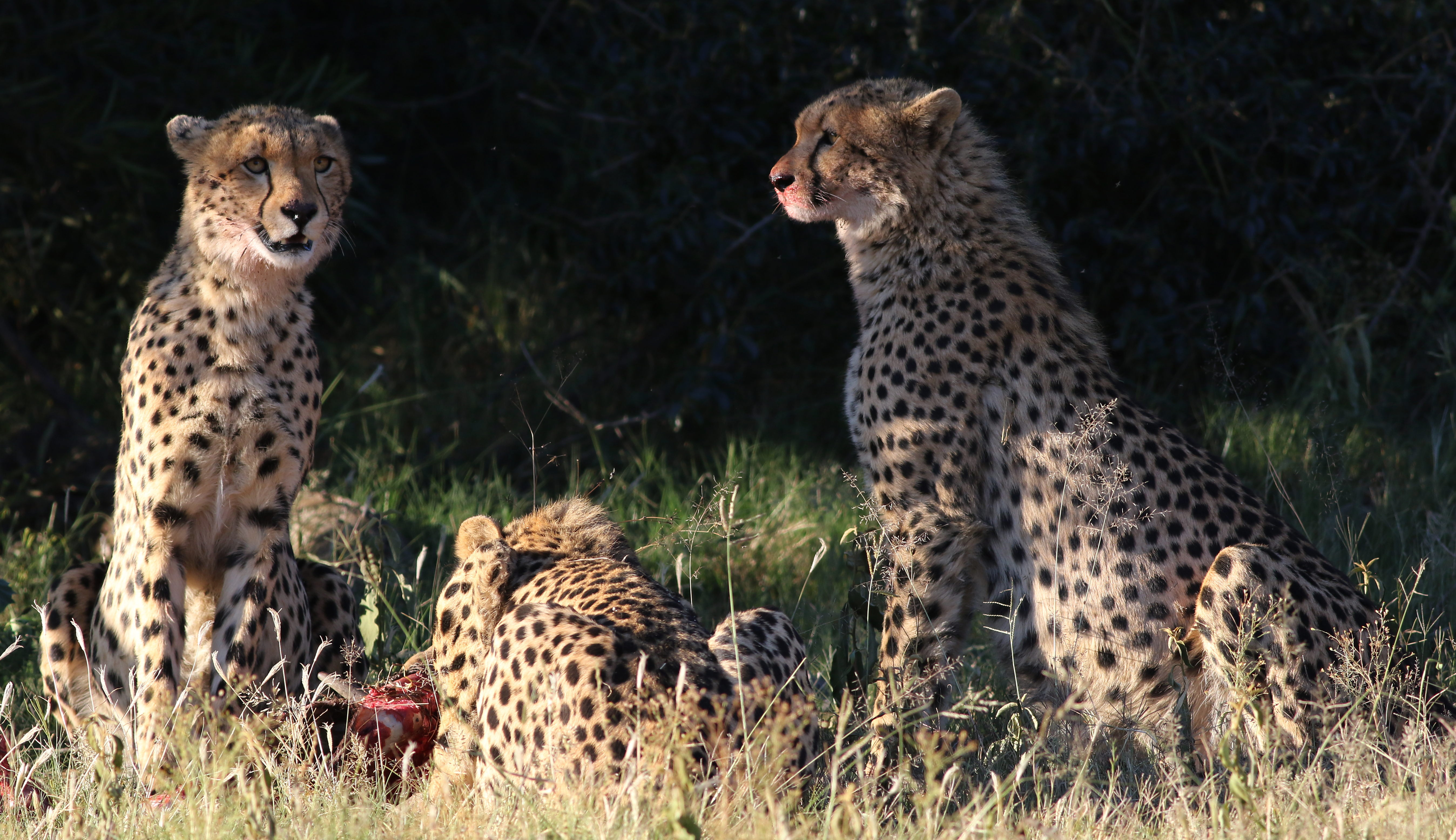
Feeding cheetah family

==== Mammals ====
Resident mammal species in Pilanesberg National Park include the lion, African leopard, South African cheetah, brown hyena, caracal, banded mongoose, African bush elephant, South-western black rhinoceros, southern white rhinoceros, African buffalo, Chapman's zebra, South African giraffe, impala, blue wildebeest, kudu, hippopotamus, waterbuck, mountain reedbuck, springbok, tsessebe, red hartebeest, klipspringer, steenbok, common eland, sable antelope, Cape bushbuck, Southern reedbuck, common duiker, warthog; primates include the chacma baboon, vervet monkey and mohol bushbaby.

The African wild dog (Lycaon pictus pictus) was extirpated from the park by poachers, but subsequent reintroduction efforts were successful. The spotted hyena was recorded in 2019.

==== Birdlife ====
Over 360 bird species having been recorded, including migrants.

==== Reptiles ====
Pilanesberg National Park harbours 66 reptilian species including tortoises, geckos, lizards, crocodiles inhabiting around Mankwe Dam and 22 snake species and amphibians living in wetlands.

==== Invertebrates ====
The park is diverse with insects, molluscs, arachnids and other forms of aquatic invertebrates shaped by Kalahari-Lowveld transition habitats and wetlands around water ways as they play a major role in Pilanesberg's ecosystem.

== Threats ==
Threats to Pilanesberg National Park's biodiversity include poaching, deteriorating infrastructure like roads and electric fence as a result of financial mismanagement, neglected public camps, violent crimes e.g robberies outside its borders on the R556, animal overpopulation, traffic congestion and speeding result in excessive levels of roadkill, encroachment of invasive species, global warming contributes to droughts and wildfires and platinum mining expansion.

== Gates to Pilanesberg ==
Pilanesberg has 4 public gates and 2 private gates:

Name	Road	Town	Coordinates
Bakubung Gate	On R556	From Ledig	25°20′23.45″S 27°03′49.14″E
Kwa-Maritane Gate	R556	From Ledig to Mogwase via Sun City	25°20′05″S 27°08′44″E
Manyane Gate	On R510	From Mogwase	25°15′14.51″S 27°13′10.35″E
Bakgatla Gate	On Kgabo Road	From Saulspoort	25°11′15″S 27°08′45″E
Black Rhino Reserve Gate	On R565	From Rustenburg	25°10′54.84″S 26°57′17.55″E
Shepherd's Tree Gate	On R565	From Rustenburg	25°18′08.57″S 26°58′56.25″E

== See also ==
- Pilanesberg International Airport
- Protected areas of South Africa
- Doornkop Reserve
