= Sun City (South Africa) =

Luxury resort and casino in North West, South Africa

Sun City Resort
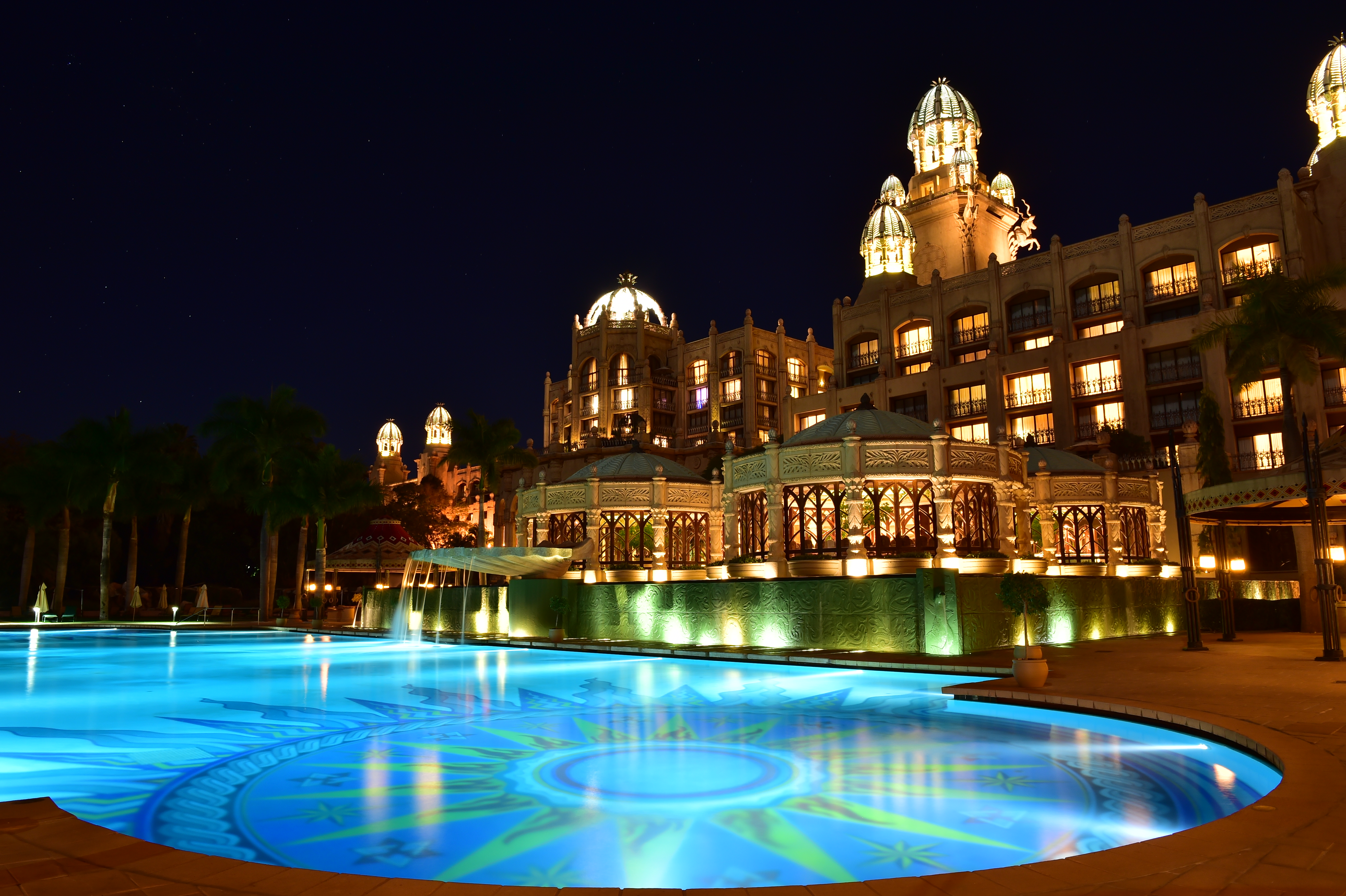
- The Palace of the Lost City

- Location within North West (South African province) Location within South Africa
- Coordinates: 25°20′25″S 27°5′27″E
- Country: South Africa
- Province: North West
- Municipality: Moses Kotane
- Established: 1979
- Time zone: UTC+2 (SAST)
- Postal code (street): 2999
- Area code: 2999
- Website: www.suninternational.com/sun-city/

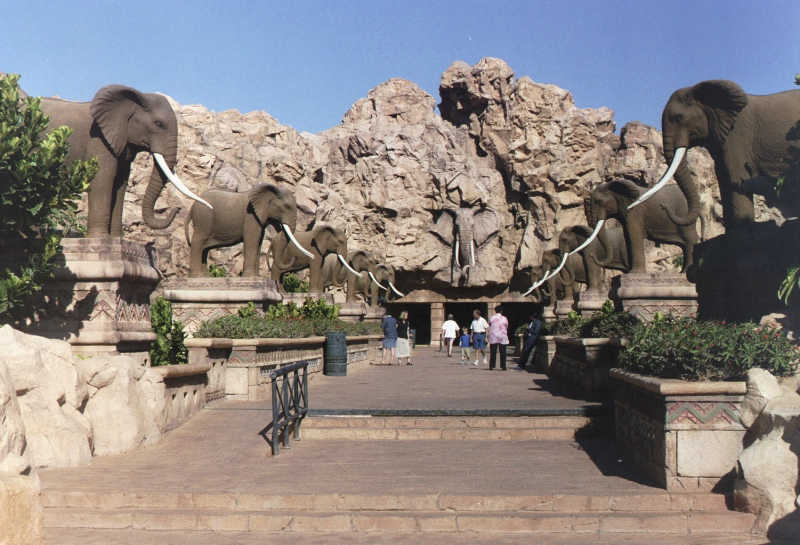
The Bridge of Time to the Lost City facing Sun central mall

Sun City is a luxury resort and casino, situated in the North West Province of South Africa. It is located between the Elands River and the Pilanesberg, built on the land of Bakubung Village (known as Ledig) about 140 km (90 miles) northwest of Johannesburg, near the city of Rustenburg. The complex borders the Pilanesberg National Park. It is made up of a number of themed sub-resorts with hotels on each, including the original Sun City Resort, The Cabanas, The Cascades and the Lost City (The Palace).

== History ==
=== Beginning ===
Sun City was developed by the hotel magnate Sol Kerzner as part of his Sun International group of properties. It was officially opened on 7 December 1979, then located in the Bantustan of Bophuthatswana.

As Bophuthatswana had been declared an independent state by South Africa's apartheid government (although unrecognised as such by any other country), it could provide entertainment such as gambling and topless revue shows, which were banned in South Africa. Those factors, as well as its relatively close location to the large metropolitan areas of Pretoria and Johannesburg, ensured that Sun City soon became a popular holiday and weekend destination. During apartheid, Sun City imposed severe restrictions on the ability of black South Africans to enter the Sun City area legally.

=== Music performances and boycotts ===
The United Nations had imposed a cultural boycott on South Africa in condemnation of apartheid. To overcome this, Kerzner offered substantial financial incentives to performing artists to use Sun City as a venue. Several acts disregarded the boycott and performed at the venue, such as the Beach Boys, Linda Ronstadt, Cher, Ray Charles, Millie Jackson, Liza Minnelli, Frank Sinatra (1981), Shirley Bassey (1981), Olivia Newton-John (1982), Dolly Parton (1982), Neil Sedaka (1982), Paul Anka, Status Quo, Rod Stewart (July 1983), Elton John (October 1983), and Boney M. (1984).

British rock band Queen's series of performances at the venue in October 1984 in transgression of the boycott caused considerable controversy, prompting criticism in the British music press, a fine from the Musicians' Union and their inclusion on the United Nations' blacklisted artists. Following the criticism, Queen strongly defended their decision, saying they "play to anybody who wants to come and listen" and were "a very non-political group", but donated to a school for the deaf and blind to assert their philanthropic values. In 2021, drummer Roger Taylor voiced regret for the Sun City shows, stating that "We went with the best intentions, but I still think it was kind of a mistake."

On 25 October 1980, Sun City's "Superbowl" hosted a racially mixed world heavyweight boxing championship fight between champion American Mike Weaver and challenger South African Gerrie Coetzee. Weaver won the fight by knockout in the 13th round, successfully defending his World Boxing Association world heavyweight title.

In 1985, E Street Band guitarist Steven Van Zandt made the venue the focus of his music-industry activist group Artists United Against Apartheid. Forty-nine top recording artists collaborated on a song called "Sun City", in which they pledged they would not perform at the resort because of their opposition to apartheid. Additionally, Simple Minds included the song as part of a live medley on their Live in the City of Light double album in 1987. The same year, Black Sabbath played six shows in Sun City with a short-lived line-up featuring original guitarist Tony Iommi, keyboardist Geoff Nicholls, then-new vocalist Tony Martin, and a rhythm section with drummer Terry Chimes (The Clash) and bassist Dave Spitz (Great White).

=== Skytrain ===
In January 1986 the Skytrain people mover, built with Otis Hovair technology, took its first trip on a 1.71 km (1.06 mi) line that connects a remote parking lot to the Entertainment Centre. Two trains of three cars shuttle on the route. According to Sun City staff, the skytrain no longer operates due to high maintenance costs and lack of parts.

=== Post-apartheid ===
Sun City has continued since Bophuthatswana was re-incorporated in the new South Africa in 1994.

The resort has four hotels:

- Sun City Hotel or The Main Hotel
- Cascades Hotel;
- The Cabanas;
- The Palace of the Lost City.

Sun City has the Vacation Club which is a hotel but also sold in a timeshare scheme.

Sun City also has two international-standard 18-hole golf courses, the Gary Player Country Club and the Lost City Golf Course, both designed by Gary Player. The Gary Player Country Club is home to the Nedbank Golf Challenge (formerly the Nedbank Million Dollar Golf Challenge) that is held annually.

The Sun City resort has hosted various concerts and events, including the Miss South Africa and Miss South Africa Teen Pageant. These pageants take place annually in Sun City's Super Bowl Arena and the Valley of Waves. It also hosted Miss World pageant five times, from 1992 to 1995, and 2001. The resort was also the site of the Sun City Agreement.

In 2001, Sun City was the site of the 2nd IIFA Awards. Held at the Superbowl Arena, it honoured both artistic and technical excellence of professionals in Bollywood, for that year. That same year, on 19 May, Irish vocal pop band Westlife held a concert for their Where Dreams Come True Tour supporting their album Coast to Coast.

In 2014, the film Blended starring Drew Barrymore and Adam Sandler premiered on the premises after being filmed mostly at the resort, as was the 2017 film 10 Days in Sun City.

In 2022, the World Classic Powerlifting Championships 2022 was held in Sun City. In 2024, the Commonwealth Powerlifting Championships and the World Masters will also be held in Sun City.

== See also ==
- Pilanesberg National Park
- Pilanesberg International Airport
- List of casinos in South Africa

Preceded by Georgia World Congress Center	Miss World Venue; 1992–1995	Succeeded by M. Chinnaswamy Stadium
Preceded by Millennium Dome	Miss World Venue; 2001	Succeeded by Alexandra Palace
