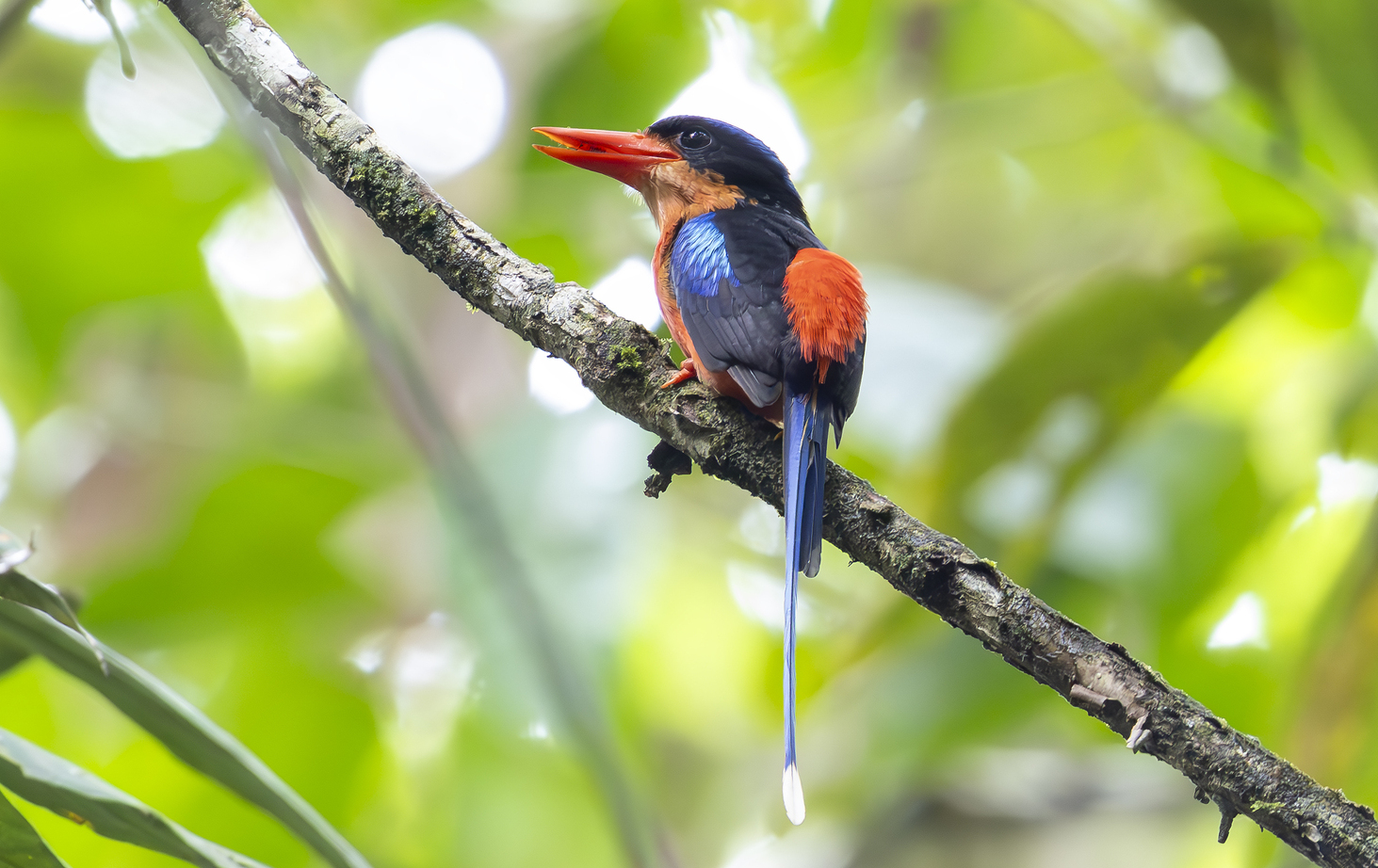

Conservation status
- Least Concern (IUCN 3.1)

Scientific classification
- Kingdom: Animalia
- Phylum: Chordata
- Class: Aves
- Order: Coraciiformes
- Family: Alcedinidae
- Subfamily: Halcyoninae
- Genus: Tanysiptera
- Species: T. nympha

Binomial name
- Tanysiptera nympha G.R. Gray, 1840

= Red-breasted paradise kingfisher =

Species of bird

The red-breasted paradise kingfisher or fairy paradise kingfisher (Tanysiptera nympha) is a species of bird in the family Alcedinidae. It is found in New Guinea. Its natural habitats are subtropical or tropical moist lowland forest and subtropical or tropical mangrove forest.
