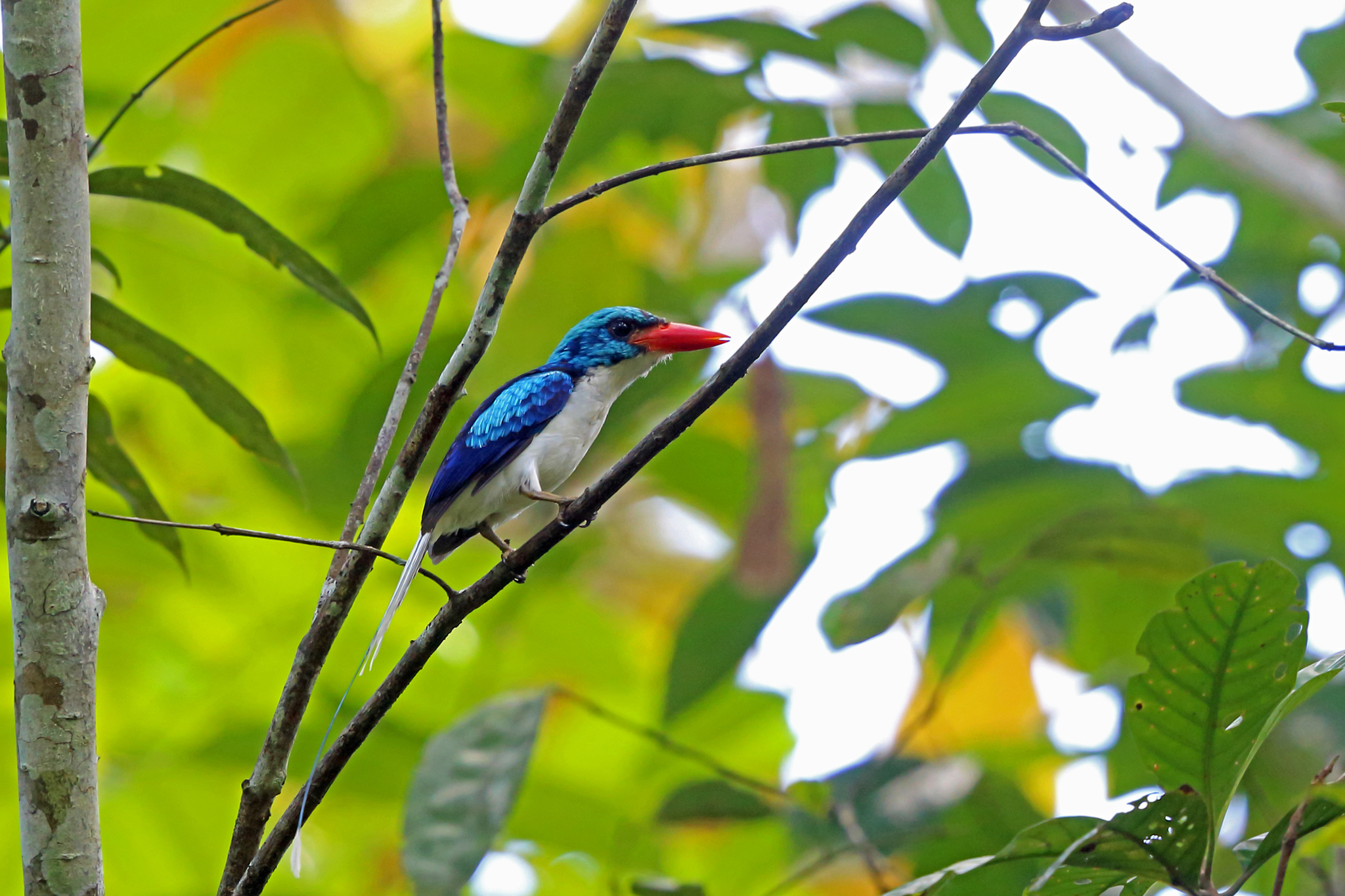

Conservation status
- Near Threatened (IUCN 3.1)

Scientific classification
- Kingdom: Animalia
- Phylum: Chordata
- Class: Aves
- Order: Coraciiformes
- Family: Alcedinidae
- Subfamily: Halcyoninae
- Genus: Tanysiptera
- Species: T. riedelii

Binomial name
- Tanysiptera riedelii Verreaux, 1866

= Biak paradise kingfisher =

Species of bird

The Biak paradise kingfisher (Tanysiptera riedelii) is a tree kingfisher that is endemic to the Indonesian island of Biak which is one of a small group of islands located in Cenderawasih Bay near the northern coast of Papua. This bird has a turquoise-blue back with a white belly and tail streamers and a reddish beak. Its natural habitat is forests and the IUCN has assessed its conservation status as being "near-threatened".

== Description ==
The adult Biak paradise kingfisher is about 14 in (36 cm) including its long tail. The crown, nape and sides of the head as well as the upper parts are a bright glossy turquoise-blue. The rump and the basal parts of the rectrices are white and the underwings are black. The two central tail feathers are greatly elongated and have bare shafts which flare out at the tip into racket-like lobes. The bird's underparts are white and the long, stout bill is red.

== Distribution ==
The Biak paradise kingfisher is found only on the island of Biak in Indonesia. It seems that these birds originated from a few founding T. galatea birds which arrived on the island and became isolated from the mainland birds. These then underwent a "genetic revolution". There were no particular biotic factors involved, but there was sufficient variation among the founding birds to encourage speciation, and the assortment of genes that the birds received was later undisturbed by further inflow of alien genes.

== Ecology ==
The adult Biak paradise kingfisher has been little studied but its diet and behaviour are thought to be similar to the closely related common paradise kingfisher (Tanysiptera galatea) which is found on the mainland of New Guinea. Some authorities consider it to be subspecies of that bird. The common paradise kingfisher perches on a low branch in the forest and swoops down to scoop up insects and earthworms off the forest floor. It nests in a cavity of a tree, in a hollow branch or in a hole excavated in an arboreal termite nest.

== Status ==
The Biak paradise kingfisher has a small range but is fairly common on the island where it lives. Its forest habitat is under threat from logging but there are large parts of the island that have not yet been harvested. It seems able to adapt to secondary growth forest but may be only present in areas with tall trees. The International Union for Conservation of Nature considers it likely that the population trend is downwards and has assessed its conservation status as being "near-threatened".
