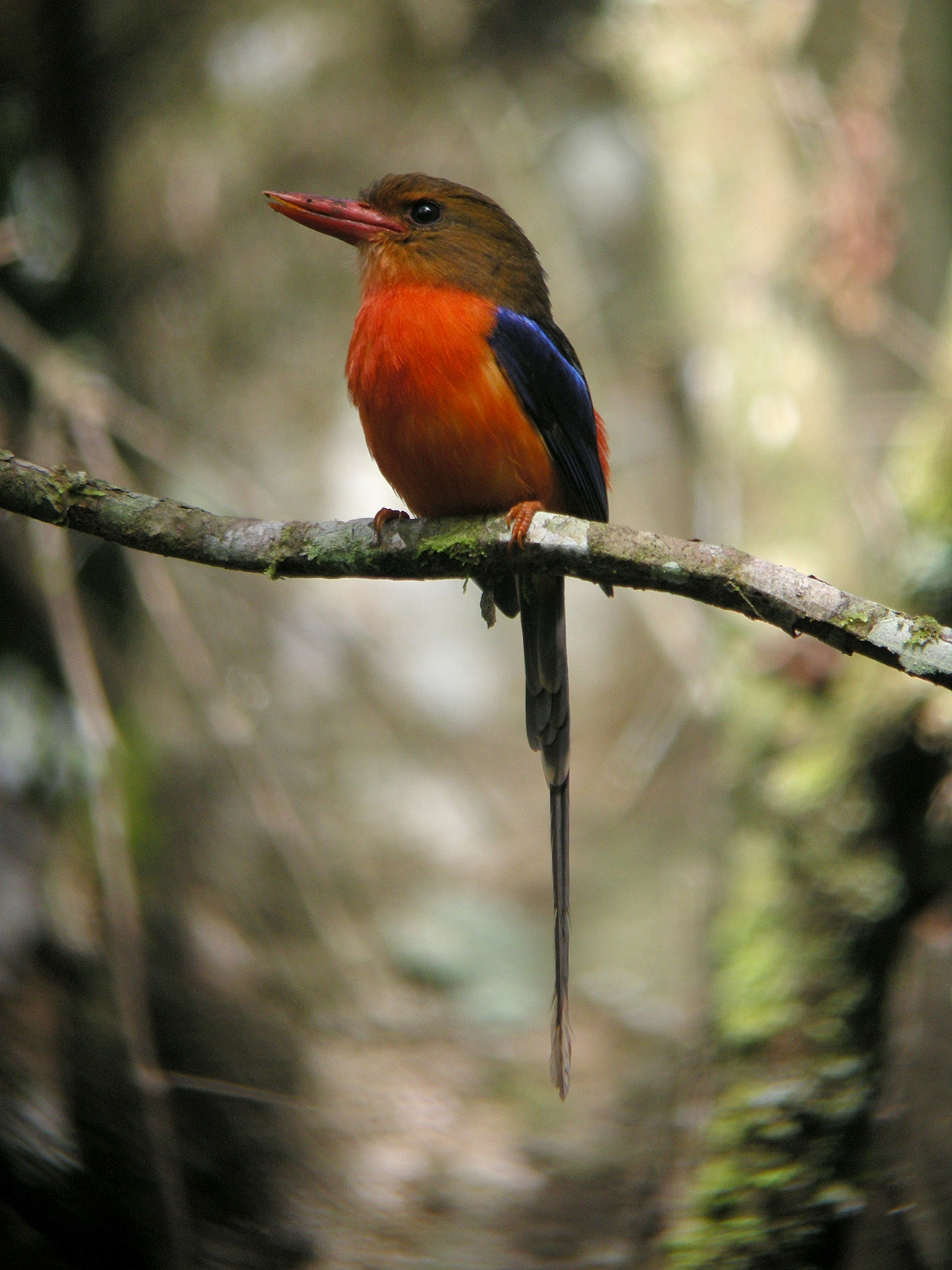
- Brown-headed paradise kingfisher (Tanysiptera danae)

Scientific classification
- Kingdom: Animalia
- Phylum: Chordata
- Class: Aves
- Order: Coraciiformes
- Family: Alcedinidae
- Subfamily: Halcyoninae
- Genus: Tanysiptera; Vigors, 1825

Type species
- Alcedo dea Linnaeus, 1766

Species
- see list

= Paradise kingfisher =

Genus of birds

Phylogeny

- Tanysiptera
  - - Buff-breasted paradise kingfisher
    - Black-capped paradise kingfisher
  - - - Red-breasted paradise kingfisher
      - Brown-headed paradise kingfisher
    - - - Little paradise kingfisher
        - - Common paradise kingfisher
          - - Biak paradise kingfisher
            - Numfor paradise kingfisher

Cladogram based on Andersen et al. (2017). The Kofiau paradise kingfisher (Tanysiptera ellioti) was not included in the study.

The paradise kingfishers (genus Tanysiptera) are a group of tree kingfishers endemic to New Guinea — with the exception of four species also present in the Moluccas and Queensland.

== Taxonomy ==
The genus was erected by the Irish zoologist Nicholas Aylward Vigors in 1825. The type species is the common paradise kingfisher. The name Tanysiptera is from classical Greek tanusipteros meaning "long-feathered". The birds in the genus have distinctive long tail streamers.

== Habitat and distribution ==
The centre of paradise kingfishers is New Guinea: Several species occur on this 786,000 km^{2} large island. In addition, there are several island endemisms that occur on islands of the Moluccas and the Louisiade Archipelago. Most paradise kingfishers are resident birds. The buff-breasted paradise kingfisher, which also occurs in the extreme northeast of Australia, moves to New Guinea in the winter half-year. The red-breasted paradise kingfisher and the brown-headed paradise kingfisher only occur on New Guinea. The little paradise kingfisher has its residence on the Aru Islands Regency and in the outermost south of New Guinea. It is assumed that the little paradise kingfisher comes from the common paradise kingfisher and developed on the Aru Islands Regency to an independent species. From this place it settled in New Guinea, where today the distribution area of the two species overlaps. These two species do not produce any natural hybrids. The Kofiau paradise kingfisher is also closely related to the common paradise kingfisher, which only occurs on Kofiau.

== Description ==
Most species of paradise-kingfishers are commonly observed in their natural habitat within the interior forests of New Guinea. However, the species itself has been known to be attracted to rivers and coasts and they demonstrate an ability to fly over large bodies of water, which is observed in the Buff-Breasted paradise kingfisher that migrates to Queensland, Australia during breeding season. An aspect found within the species is the syndactyly in the feet, where the third and fourth toes of the bird are fused. There are several arguments as to what benefits syndactyly proposes; one is that syndactyl feet may provide more strength for perching on branches. This may aid the birds when hunting for prey within their rainforest environment. Others claim nest in termite mounds, syndactyly aids paradise-kingfishers in excavating nest cavities for their young. Finally, there are arguments that syndactyly has no benefit to the birds at all. The plumage of juvenile paradise-kingfishers differs from that of adults until they undergo a partial molt in which only the flight feathers are retained, then becoming similar in appearance to that of adults. In buff-breasted paradise-kingfishers, adults wear colorful plumage, have bright beaks, and sport long tails accounting for nearly half the length of the birds. Juveniles have duller plumage, dark-colored bills, and lack the long tail streamers of adults.

Most paradise-kingfishers are extremely territorial, with most birds living in territorial pairs but choosing to forage alone. Some studies also claim that this territoriality is attributed to the defence of resources within the area. Upon observation of the breeding habits of the buff-breasted paradise-kingfisher, it found that they to actively defend their territory at the vocalisation of other intruder birds and chases involving two to four males were common, to the extent of males causing damage on each other such as broken wings. Paradise kingfishers are classified as hole-nesters and use their webbed feet to excavate nest holes in termite mounds. Most species chose arboreal termite mounds located on the sides of trees about 3–4.5m from the ground and those that are still actively inhabited by termites. This is because studies show that live termitariums are stronger when inhabited and become fragile after the insects leave, making them more susceptible to predators.

The paradise kingfisher species is also known to have a wide array of vocalisation. Territorial calls often consisted of rhythmic syllables that were ascending in nature and made in the middle to upper forest levels. Studies observing the species witnessed common vocalisation when the bird approaches the nest, in reassurance to their partner and to sound off an alarm when another predator is within their territory. Young kingfishers demonstrate loud vocalisation around two weeks old, especially during feeding time when expecting the parents return. The different species of birds tend to be most vocal during breeding season however majority expend a great deal of time and energy tunnelling out their nests in the chosen termite mounds up to two weeks at length.

== Breeding ==
Paradise-kingfishers are known to have long-term bonds with each other and practice social monogamy. Most birds return to the same territory with the same partner during the breeding season, unless their partner had died in which case, they replaced them and were found in a new territory. Most species in the region are breeding residents except for the buff-breasted paradise-kingfisher that nests in Australia but has been known to migrate to New Guinea, where most of them have populations. The paradise kingfisher species also demonstrates social cooperation, though this has only been observed within the buff breasted species of the genus. During the breeding season, it is common to observe an additional male joining the breeding pair to help protect the territory and care for nestlings. The exact reason for this is unknown; however, one argument states that there may be benefits involved the additional male, as it gives them access to possible future partners in the form of the nestlings or the breeding female.

Paradise-kingfishers nest in active terrestrial termite mounds, typically found at the base of trees within the rainforests in which the birds are located. The preference of active termite mounds has been hypothesised to be because abandoned termite mounds become weak and fragile over time, thus making the nest unsuitable for the birds as it is easier for natural predators to infiltrate. Furthermore, during breeding season, adult kingfishers locate new nests different from that of the previous year, once abandoning the nest after breeding season ends, termites in active termitariums work towards repairing the nesting hole left by the birds to raise the young. The nest of the paradise kingfisher is created by the pair of birds flying repeatedly at the termitarium of choice, striking it with their beaks until they manage to puncture a hole into the hard surface. From there, the birds are able to excavate a space within the termitarium using their feet and create an egg chamber "about 13 cm in diameter". These egg chambers are located at the end of a tunnel within the termite nests. Buff-breasted paradise-kingfishers have been found to create nests located on ground level. Due to the nature of the nests, most paradise-kingfishers have a specific odour to their nests due to the lack of sanitation that occurs within these units. The clutch of a paradise kingfisher consists of around one to three eggs and the young stay within the nest until old enough to leave. Both paradise-kingfisher parents are known to care for the young, incubating and feeding the chicks for 25 days until time to fledge.

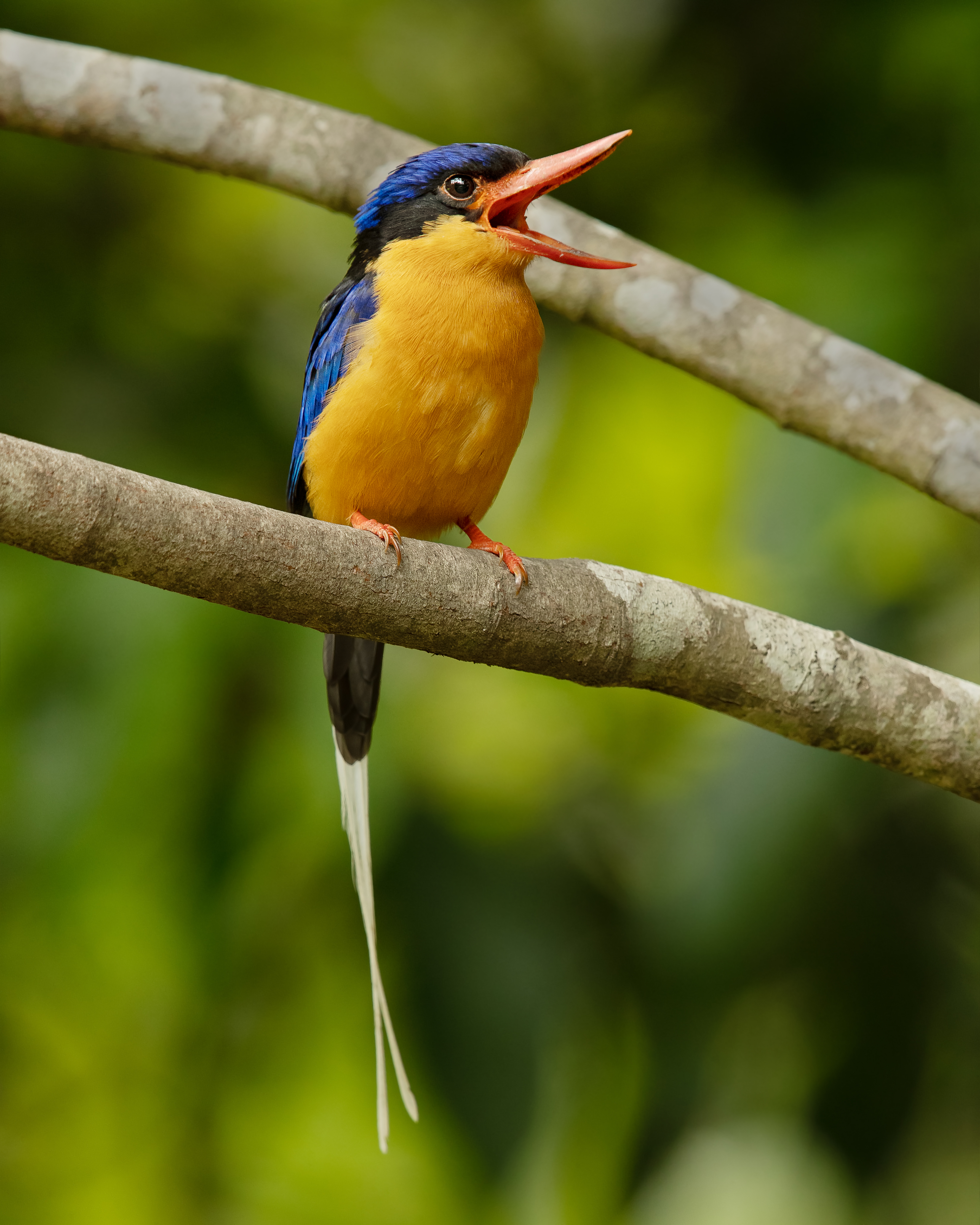
Photo of an adult Buff-Breasted Paradise Kingfisher

A common phenomenon demonstrated in the kingfisher species is brood reduction, due to asynchronous hatching. This occurs when the first egg to be laid is the first to hatch thus permitting the eldest chick a head start on the other nestlings as it is able to get majority of the parental care. In addition to that, because the birds are considered hole-nesters, the eldest chick usually will take up the opening of the nest and dominate the food resources leading to the death of the smallest chick. This ensures that the depending on the availability of the food that season, the paradise-kingfisher brood may be larger or smaller. This may also be attributed to limited reproduction in paradise-kingfisher birds located within the tropics of New Guinea as food resources tend to be scarcer. Thus, not allowing for larger broods to survive as opposed to other environments with an abundance of resources.

== Diet ==
Paradise kingfishers are omnivores choosing to eat snails, small lizards and worms, however, Legge and Heinsohn found that majority of their diet consist of small insects such as grasshoppers, beetles and cicadas. They are also known to be diurnal, hunting and active during the day instead of at night.

Adult paradise kingfishers feed their young invertebrates up to the maximum size of 3 cm in length depending on the age of the chick. The younger the hatchlings the smaller the meals are and increase in size as they grow from hatchling to fledgeling. Feeding the chicks happens through the parents bringing the insects to the mound and delivering the food to the nestlings through the nest tunnel when they are newly hatched. As the older chicks learn to open their eyes and gain control of coordination, they begin to meet the parents at the entrance of the nest and are brought larger insects to sustain them, and occasionally frogs and skinks depending on the availability of food resources at the time.

An indicator of how efficient the paradise-kingfishers hunting skills and eyesight is the consistency in which they return with insects known to well camouflage such as stick insects and preying mantids. The buff breasted paradise-kingfisher is known to hunt by sitting motionless on the forest floor, or low tree trunks or branches while searching for various types of prey, pouncing to secure the food. Majority of the species can be found to hunt on the ground or in other vegetation as well as the trees. This species is one of only that rarely feeds on fish apart from other paradise-kingfishers in the genus endemic to Papua New Guinea. Young paradise-kingfishers can begin to hunt for their own prey after two months of hatching however are able to fly earlier on.

== Conservation status and threats ==
The International Union for the Conservation of Nature and Natural Resources Red List lists the population trend of the Biak and Numfor Paradise-Kingfishers as decreasing and classifies the species as near threatened. Meanwhile, the Common Paradise-Kingfisher, Brown-Headed Paradise Kingfisher, Buff-Breasted Paradise Kingfisher, Red-Breasted Paradise Kingfisher and Black-Headed Paradise Kingfisher are classified as of least concern on the list, but all demonstrated a decreasing population trend, except for the Brown-Headed Paradise Kingfisher that shows stable numbers in the wild. The Kofiau Paradise-Kingfisher is categorised as vulnerable on the list but has a stable population trend globally.

The natural predators of buff-breasted paradise-kingfishers are various snake species that are smaller build, making them able to intercept the narrow tunnel of the nest in order to reach the nestlings. Another common predator is the goanna, that can break through the small opening in the nest of the birds. Meanwhile, man-made threats that pose a risk to paradise-kingfisher numbers in the wild is overexploitation of logging and mining projects occurring within the forests of New Guinea. Industrial agriculture such as palm oil production may be attributed to the habitat loss occurring to the paradise-kingfisher genus and the country's biological diversity.

According to International Union for the Conservation of Nature and Natural Resources Red List, majority of the areas home to the paradise-kingfishers are conservation sites. However, it is not guaranteed protection and there are currently no action recovery plans or systematic monitoring schemes in place to ensure protection of the paradise-kingfisher species. Furthermore, none of the species are subjected to recent education and awareness programs, international management or included in any international legislation that outlines the protection of the species from man-made threats such as deforestation and habitat loss. This may be because although industrial logging and mining occurring within the natural habitat of the paradise-kingfishers poses significant threat to the species conservation efforts, it is a significant driver of economic growth within the country and a large generator of employment.

== Species ==
There are fourteen species:

- Papuan paradise kingfisher, Tanysiptera galatea – New Guinea
- Kofiau paradise kingfisher, Tanysiptera ellioti – Kofiau (Raja Ampat Islands, northwest of New Guinea)
- Biak paradise kingfisher, Tanysiptera riedelii – Biak (Geelvink Bay islands, northwest New Guinea)
- Numfor paradise kingfisher, Tanysiptera carolinae – Numfor (Geelvink Bay islands, northwest New Guinea)
- Little paradise kingfisher, Tanysiptera hydrocharis – Aru Islands (southwest of New Guinea) and central south New Guinea
- Buff-breasted paradise kingfisher, Tanysiptera sylvia – central north, central south, southeast New Guinea and northeast Australia
- Black-capped paradise kingfisher, Tanysiptera nigriceps – New Britain group (southeast Bismarck Archipelago)
- Red-breasted paradise kingfisher, Tanysiptera nympha – Bird's Head Peninsula (northwest New Guinea) and disjunctly in northeast (Adelbert Range, Huon Peninsula and Huon Gulf) New Guinea
- Brown-headed paradise kingfisher, Tanysiptera danae – southeast New Guinea
- Obi paradise kingfisher, Tanysiptera obiensis - Obi Islands
- Rossel paradise kingfisher, Tanysiptera rosseliana - Rossel Island
- Morotai paradise kingfisher, Tanysiptera doris - Morotai
- Amboyna paradise kingfisher, Tanysiptera nais - Buru and Seram
- Halmahera paradise kingfisher, Tanysiptera margarethae - Halmahera and Bacan
