= Numfor paradise kingfisher =

Conservation status
- Near Threatened (IUCN 3.1)

Scientific classification
- Kingdom: Animalia
- Phylum: Chordata
- Class: Aves
- Order: Coraciiformes
- Family: Alcedinidae
- Subfamily: Halcyoninae
- Genus: Tanysiptera
- Species: T. carolinae

Binomial name
- Tanysiptera carolinae Schlegel, 1871

Species of bird

The Numfor paradise kingfisher (Tanysiptera carolinae), also known as the cobalt paradise kingfisher, is a tree kingfisher endemic to the Indonesian island of Numfor off the northwestern coast of New Guinea. It is a common species, but the forests where it lives are being affected by logging and the IUCN has rated its conservation status as "near-threatened".

== Description ==
The Numfor paradise kingfisher grows to a length of 34 to 38 cm (13 to 15 in) including its long tail. The sexes look alike and have purplish-blue upper parts and similarly coloured underparts, with the lower back, rump, vent region and tail being white. The iris is brown, the bill red and the legs and feet greenish-brown. The juvenile has duller purple-blue plumage with rufous and buff underparts, a white rump and blackish tail. The voice is said to be similar to the call of the common cuckoo (Cuculus canorus).

== Distribution and habitat ==
The Numfor paradise kingfisher is found only on Numfor, a 335 km^{2} (129 mi^{2}) island in the Biak Island group off the northwestern coast of Papua Province, Indonesia. Its typical habitat is forest, light woodland, agricultural land and coastal vegetation. It seems that these birds originated from a few founding T. galatea birds which arrived on the island and became isolated from the mainland birds. These then underwent a "genetic revolution". There were no particular biotic factors involved, but there was sufficient variation among the founding birds to encourage speciation, and the assortment of genes that the birds received was later undisturbed by further inflow of alien genes.

== Ecology ==
The diet of the Numfor paradise kingfisher mostly consists of snails and large insects such as grasshoppers and beetles. Its behaviour and ecology have been little studied and are presumed to be similar to those of the common paradise kingfisher (Tanysiptera galatea) which is found on the mainland of New Guinea.

== Status ==
This bird is affected by the logging taking place on Numfor, with much of the forest being cleared and converted for agricultural use. The bird is described as common, but the extent to which it can adapt to secondary habitat is unclear, and it is suspected that its population is in slow decline, so the International Union for Conservation of Nature has rated it to be a "near-threatened species".
