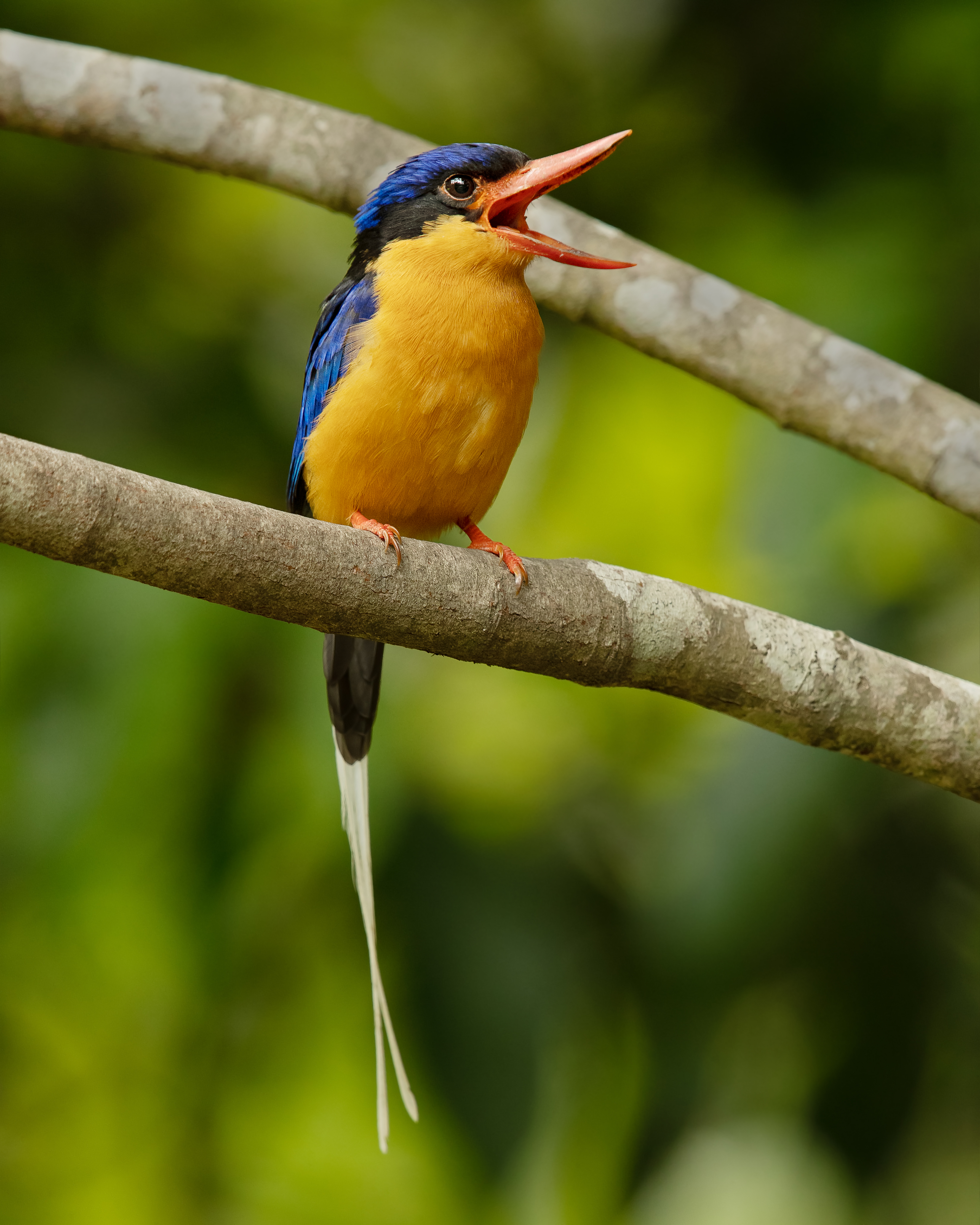

Conservation status
- Least Concern (IUCN 3.1)

Scientific classification
- Kingdom: Animalia
- Phylum: Chordata
- Class: Aves
- Order: Coraciiformes
- Family: Alcedinidae
- Subfamily: Halcyoninae
- Genus: Tanysiptera
- Species: T. sylvia

Binomial name
- Tanysiptera sylvia Gould, 1850

= Buff-breasted paradise kingfisher =

Species of bird

The buff-breasted paradise kingfisher (Tanysiptera sylvia) is a bird in the tree kingfisher subfamily, Halcyoninae. It is native to Australia and New Guinea. It migrates in November from New Guinea to its breeding grounds in the rainforest of North Queensland, Australia. Like all paradise kingfishers, this bird has colourful plumage with a red bill, buff breast and distinctive long tail streamers.

== Taxonomy ==
The buff-breasted paradise kingfisher was first described by the English ornithologist and bird artist John Gould in 1850 as Tanysiptera sylvia from specimens supplied by the naturalist John MacGillivray, which had been collected on the Cape York Peninsula in Australia. The genus name is derived from the Greek tanuo meaning 'long' and pteron meaning 'wing', whilst sylvia is from the Latin silva, meaning 'forest'. Until recently the species was known as the white-tailed kingfisher. The name buff-breasted paradise kingfisher was first used in Australia by Graham Pizzey in 1980.

There are two subspecies:

- T. sylvia sylvia Gould, 1850 – the nominate subspecies, breeds in northern Queensland and winters in New Guinea
- T. s. salvadoriana Ramsay, 1878 – in honour of the Italian ornithologist Tommaso Salvadori, breeds in southeast New Guinea.

The black-capped paradise kingfisher, which is endemic to the Bismarck Archipelago, was previously considered to be a subspecies of the buff-breasted paradise kingfisher.

Other vernacular names used include white-tailed kingfisher, white-tailed Tanysiptera (used by Gould in 1869), Australian paradise-kingfisher, long-tailed kingfisher, silver-tailed kingfisher, racquet-tailed kingfisher, black-headed kingfisher, kinghunter, Tcherwal-Tcherwal (Aboriginal language).

== Description ==
Like all paradise kingfishers, the buff-breasted is brightly coloured with a large red bill, rich rufous-buff underparts, blue or purple cap, crown and outer tail feathers, black eye stripes running down to the nape of its neck, red feet, white lower back and rump and long white or blue-and-white tail-feathers which varies geographically. The identifying feature is the white patch on the centre of the upper back. The juvenile has a brown bill, yellowish feet, is duller and lacks long tail feathers.

An adult male is 35 cm (14 in) in length including the tail feathers which extend 13 cm (5.1 in) beyond the rest of the tail. An adult female is 30 cm (12 in), including much shorter tail feathers, extending 8 cm (3.1 in) beyond the rest of the tail. Tails vary in length but are approximately 18 cm (7.1 in). Tail-feathers of juveniles and immatures are shorter than adults. The tail feathers are often damaged towards the end of the breeding season, most likely from entering and leaving the burrow and regrow before the next mating season. The wingspan for an adult male is 35 cm (14 in) and adult female is 34 cm (13 in). They weigh 45–50 g (1.6–1.8 oz).

=== Vocalisation ===
Despite its bright colours, the buff-breasted paradise kingfisher is often difficult to see in the rainforest and is best located by its distinctive calls. It is usually noisier early in the season when the males are establishing territories and courting. Based on studies in New Guinea the bird calls much less frequently during the non-breeding season.

The most commonly heard call has been described as an ascending ch-kow, ch-kow, chop chop, chuga, chuga or tcherwill tcherwill repeated 4-5 times. Each call is usually accompanied by continuous flicking of the tail, often pointing their heads skyward, pulling their wings downwards and fluffing up their white feathers. A soft descending trill is often used when approaching the nest and occasionally while perched. It is regarded as a sign of uncertainty and is said to be a reassuring call to its mate. Explosive shrieks can be heard when alarmed. In New Guinea the song is described as a soft purring trill. The call of nestlings is described as a soft but constant whirring sound. The birds can call with the mouth closed or when holding food in its bill.

== Distribution and habitat ==
During the breeding season from November to March, the buff-breasted paradise kingfisher is found in coastal north-east Queensland from islands in the Torres Strait and Cape York Peninsula south to Byfield, in central Queensland. Individual sightings have been recorded at Eurimbula National Park, south of Gladstone, and on islands of the Great Barrier Reef.

The buff-breasted paradise kingfisher inhabits lowland monsoon rainforest, and isolated patches of hill forest in areas where active termite mounds suitable for nesting are located. They usually perch in the mid-storey and lower canopy, coming to the ground to feed.

=== Migration ===
The subspecies T. s. sylvia breeds in north east Queensland from November to early April before migrating north to New Guinea for the non-breeding season. Juveniles depart up to 3 weeks after adults. The distance travelled for each population ranges between 400 and 2000 km depending on the breeding and non-breeding locations. The buff-breasted paradise kingfisher is believed to migrate in flocks at night as large numbers of birds suddenly appear in Queensland rainforests at the start of the breeding season early in the morning.

Many birds are believed to perish during the 80 km flight from New Guinea to Australia. The birds have been recorded flying close to the water and drowning in sea spray, colliding with the Booby Island Lighthouse, and arriving at their destination in a state of severe exhaustion. Populations breeding in New Guinea are believed to be resident.

== Behaviour ==
The species shows signs of territorial behaviour in non-breeding grounds in New Guinea where single birds defend their resources. During the breeding season in Australia territories are defended by pairs.

=== Breeding ===
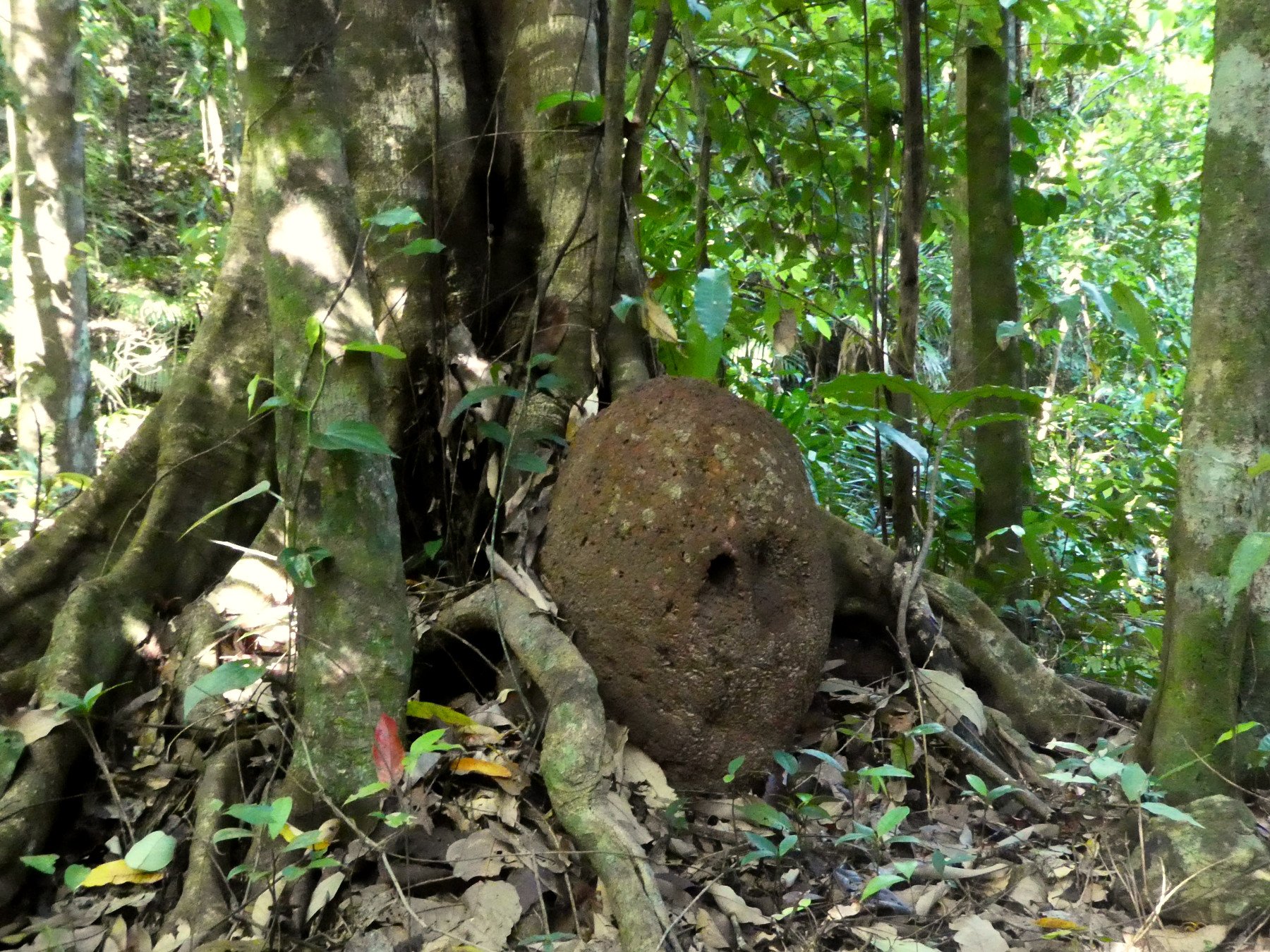
Buff-breasted paradise kingfisher nest in termite mound, Cairns, Jan 2021

In Australia nests are made in termite mounds of Microcerotermes serratus on the ground. Nests have also been recorded in mounds attached to living trees with the bases 1.5–3 m (4.9–9.8 ft) above the ground. The kingfishers use termitaria on the ground as well as in trees. The breeding season in Australia begins soon after arrival in mid-October to early November. Mounds are typically 40–70 cm (16–28 in) high and 40–50 cm (16–20 in) wide. An entrance, usually 4 cm (1.6 in) across is made in the side about 35–50 cm (14–20 in) from the ground Tunnel entrances have been observed on the downhill side of the mounds. Soon after arrival the birds commence work on their nests, usually spending 3–4 weeks burrowing out a 15 cm (5.9 in) tunnel. The floor of the tunnel is flat and smooth with a rounded chamber at the end. No nesting material is used. Birds may use the same mound in subsequent years but always have to dig a fresh tunnel as termites usually fill in the hole from the previous year. Not all mounds that are excavated are used as nests. Some are left inactive although they may be used when active nests are predated. After the young have left the nest, a large amount of rubbish remains, including pinfeather covers, faeces, maggots and food scraps such as beetle legs. The nest chamber is very hot and strong smelling. Nests are made in mounds where termites are active, which may be due to termites maintaining a constant temperature suitable for incubating the eggs or that the termites help to keep the tunnel intact by preventing collapse.

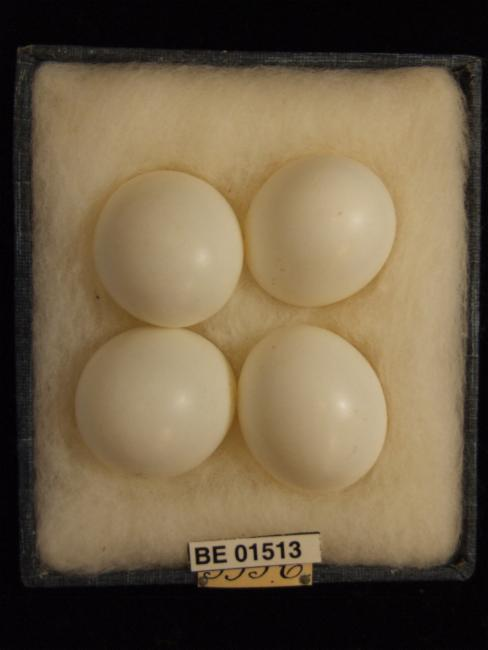
Buff-breasted paradise kingfisher eggs from NMV

The buff-breasted paradise kingfisher normally produces a single clutch of eggs each year, only producing a second clutch when the first fails early in the breeding season. The clutch is 3-4 lustrous, white, rounded eggs measuring 22 mm × 25 mm (0.87 in × 0.98 in). They are incubated by both parents and hatch after about 23 days. The chicks fledge after approximately 25 days and birds have been observed leaving the nest and flying directly to a branch. The average fledging success rate for a pair of kingfishers is 1.5.

=== Diet ===
The buff-breasted paradise kingfisher hunts on the ground and from the foliage in the middle to lower levels of the forest canopy. It feeds on phasmids, earthworms, beetles, insect larvae, spiders, skinks and small frogs, snails and has been observed holding a small tortoise. The young are fed by both parents.

== Threats and conservation status ==
Natural predators of nest eggs include goannas and snakes (such as brown tree snakes, green tree snakes and Australian tree snakes), whilst a butcherbird has also been observed preying on young. Land clearing and habitat loss in New Guinea have the potential to impact on the breeding populations in Australia. Although the population trend is declining, the buff-breasted paradise kingfisher is assessed as "least concern" on the IUCN Red List.

== Culture ==
The buff-breasted paradise kingfisher has been depicted on the 22 cent Australian stamp in 1980 and the 25 toea Papua New Guinea stamp in 1981.
