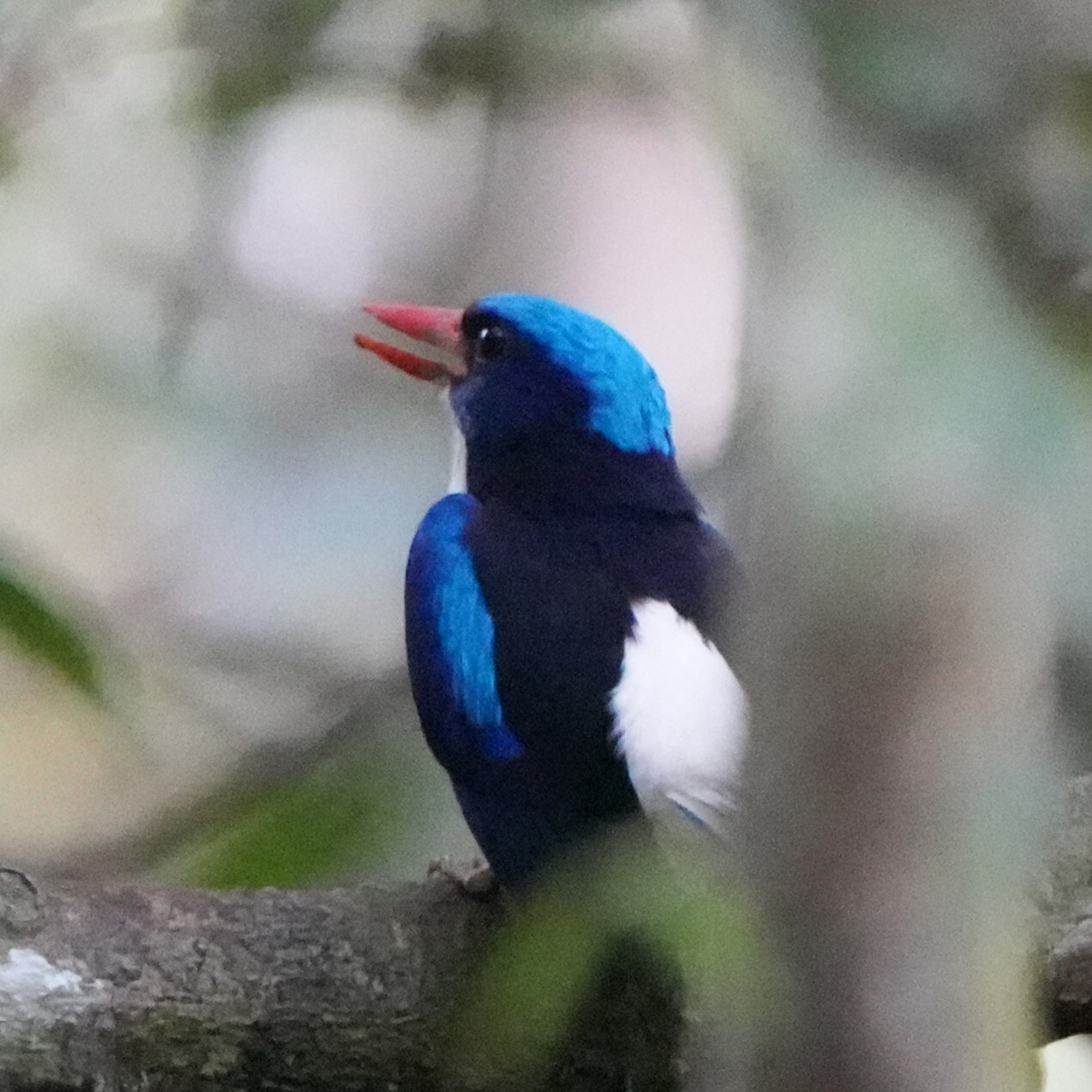

Conservation status
- Data Deficient (IUCN 3.1)

Scientific classification
- Kingdom: Animalia
- Phylum: Chordata
- Class: Aves
- Order: Coraciiformes
- Family: Alcedinidae
- Subfamily: Halcyoninae
- Genus: Tanysiptera
- Species: T. hydrocharis

Binomial name
- Tanysiptera hydrocharis Gray, 1858

= Little paradise kingfisher =

Species of bird

The little paradise kingfisher (Tanysiptera hydrocharis) is a species of bird in the family Alcedinidae. It is found in the Aru Islands and southern New Guinea.

== Description ==
It is similar to the common paradise kingfisher, albeit smaller. The juvenile is grey-brown with buff undersides. Its short tail is blue.
