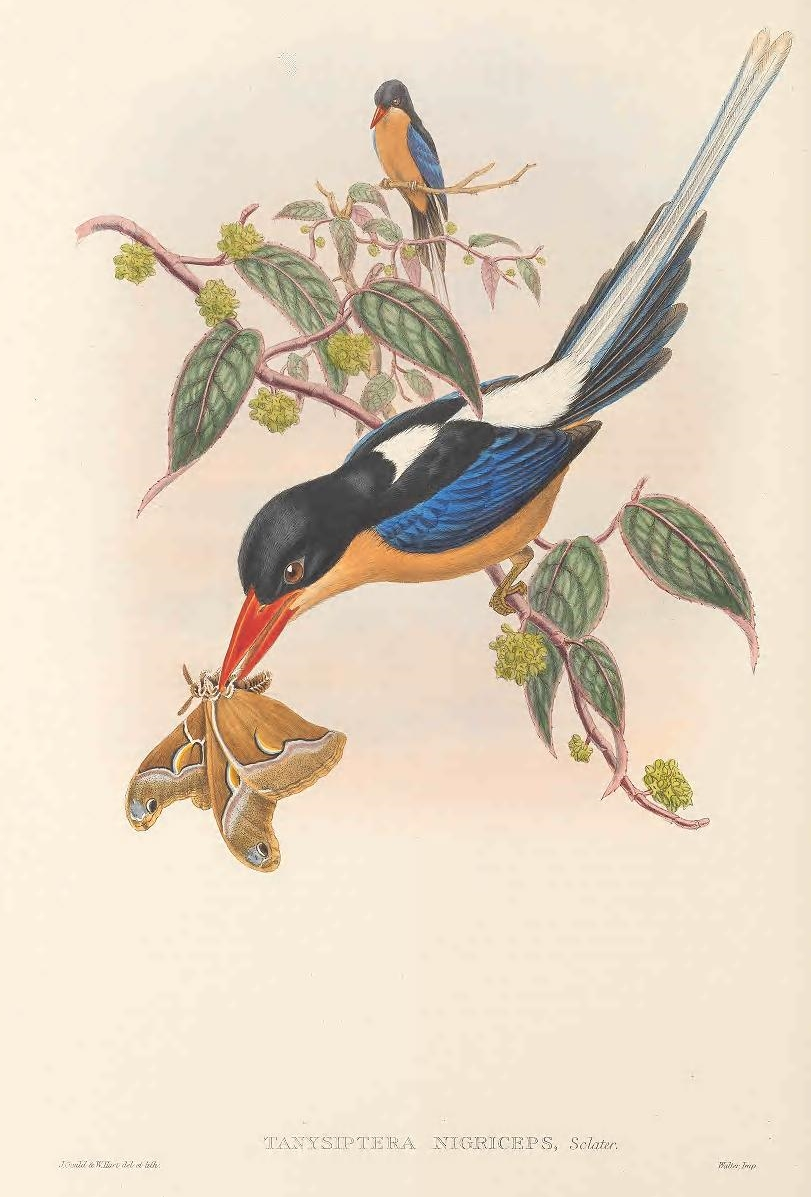

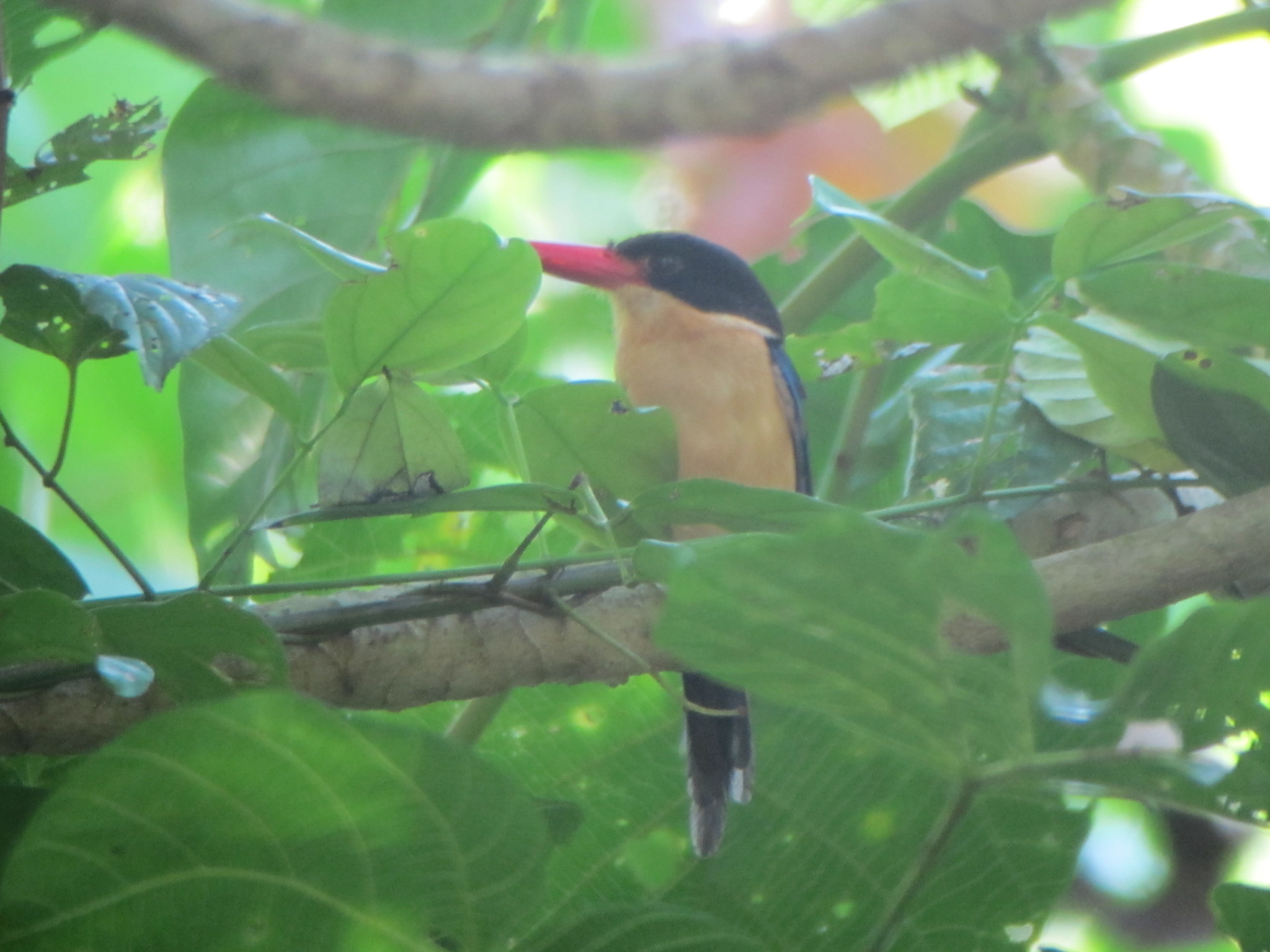

Conservation status
- Least Concern (IUCN 3.1)

Scientific classification
- Kingdom: Animalia
- Phylum: Chordata
- Class: Aves
- Order: Coraciiformes
- Family: Alcedinidae
- Subfamily: Halcyoninae
- Genus: Tanysiptera
- Species: T. nigriceps

Binomial name
- Tanysiptera nigriceps Sclater, PL, 1877

= Black-capped paradise kingfisher =

Species of bird

The black-capped paradise kingfisher (Tanysiptera nigriceps) or black-headed paradise kingfisher, is a bird in the tree kingfisher subfamily, Halcyoninae. It is native to several islands in the Bismarck Archipelago to the east of New Guinea. Like all paradise kingfishers, this bird has colourful plumage with a red bill and long distinctive tail streamers.

== Taxonomy ==
The first formal description of the black-capped paradise kingfisher was by the English lawyer and zoologist Philip Sclater in 1877. He coined the current binomial name Tanysiptera nigriceps. The genus Tanysiptera had been introduced by the Irish zoologist Nicholas Aylward Vigors in 1825. The name Tanysiptera is from classical Greek tanusipteros meaning "long-feathered". The specific epithet nigriceps is from the Latin niger for "black" and -ceps for "head". The black-capped paradise kingfisher has sometimes been considered as a subspecies as the buff-breasted paradise kingfisher (Tanysiptera sylvia).

There are two subspecies:

- T. n. leucura Neumann, 1915 – Umboi Island in the Bismarck Archipelago
- T. n. nigriceps Sclater, PL, 1877 – New Britain and Duke of York Island in the Bismarck Archipelago

== Description ==
The black-capped paradise kingfisher is 35–48 cm (14–19 in) in overall length including the tail streamers and weighs from 43 to 74 g (1.5 to 2.6 oz). The sexes are alike. The adult of the nominate race has a black head, nape, ear-coverts and scapulars. The mantle, rump and two central tail feathers are white. The wings and outer tail feathers are blue. The underparts are a pale yellowish buff. The bill and feet are orange. The subspecies T. s. leucura differs only in having completely white tail feathers.
