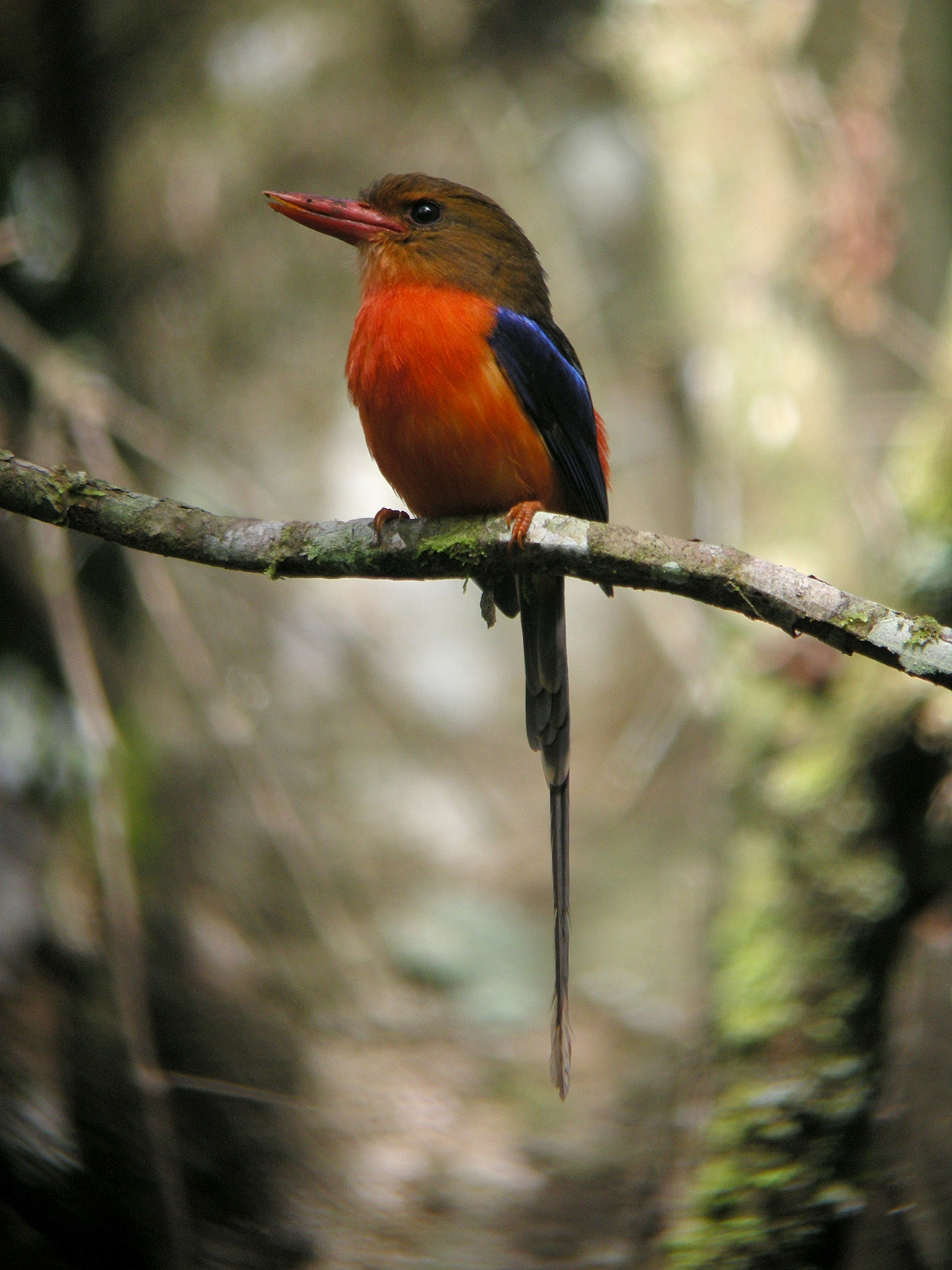

Conservation status
- Least Concern (IUCN 3.1)

Scientific classification
- Kingdom: Animalia
- Phylum: Chordata
- Class: Aves
- Order: Coraciiformes
- Family: Alcedinidae
- Subfamily: Halcyoninae
- Genus: Tanysiptera
- Species: T. danae

Binomial name
- Tanysiptera danae Sharpe, 1880

= Brown-headed paradise kingfisher =

Species of bird

The brown-headed paradise kingfisher (Tanysiptera danae), also known as the russet paradise kingfisher, is a species of bird in the family Alcedinidae. It is endemic to the lowland forest in the Bird's Tail Peninsula (Papua New Guinea). Its natural habitats are temperate forests and subtropical or tropical moist lowland forests. Like all paradise kingfishers this bird has colourful plumage with a red bill and distinctive long tail streamers. No subspecies are distinguished.

== Taxonomy ==
The first formal description of the brown-headed paradise kingfisher was by the English ornithologist Richard Bowdler Sharpe in 1880 from specimens collected near Milne Bay in southeastern New Guinea. He coined the current binomial name Tanysiptera danae. The genus Tanysiptera had been introduced by the Irish zoologist Nicholas Aylward Vigors in 1825. The name Tanysiptera is from classical Greek tanusipteros meaning "long-feathered". The specific epithet danae is from Greek mythology; Danaë was the daughter of Acrisius, King of Argos. The species is monotypic.

== Habitat and distribution ==
The brown-headed paradise kingfisher is distributed in deep forest areas in the far east of New Guinea. It mainly inhabits the forests of foothills and occurs mainly in dense primary forests. Its altitude ranges from 300 to 1000 vertical metres. The common paradise kingfisher also occurs in its distribution area. Usually the brown-headed paradise kingfisher is represented at higher altitudes than the common paradise kingfisher. However, in the region around Popondetta, the capital of the province Oro of Papua New Guinea in the southeast of the island, both species occur at altitudes of 150 meters. The brown-headed paradise kingfisher is to be observed here even more frequently than the common paradise kingfisher.

== Description ==
The brown-headed kingfisher is 23 cm (9.1 in) in length excluding the streamers which are up to 9 cm (3.5 in). They weigh between 37 and 50 grams. The sexes are alike. The head, mantle and scapulars are a warm rufous-brown. The rump, breast and belly are pink-red. The flight feathers are black and the greater coverts are bright blue. The tail is dark purplish blue, the bill is red and the legs and feet are pink or orange.

== Diet ==
Its food mainly consists out of insects it catches on the ground. The type specimen was collected by Charles Huntein in the area around Milne Bay in Papua New Guinea.

== Naming and etymology ==
Richard Bowdler Sharpe published the brown-headed kingfisher under the present name Tanysiptera danae. The type specimen was collected by Charles Huntein in the area around the Milne Bay in Papua New Guinea. In 1825 Nicholas Aylward Vigors introduced the genus Tanysiptera for the Paradise jacamar (Galbula dea (Linnaeus, 1758)). This name is composed of the Greek words "tany-, teinō τανυ, τεινω" which stands for "long, stretched" and "pteron πτερον" for "feather". The byname name "danae" probably refers to "Danaë", the daughter of Acrisius. Since there were also other Danaës in Greek mythology and Sharpe did not provide an exact explanation of the name, it cannot be excluded that he had Danaë, the daughter of Neoptolemus, or Danaë, the daughter of Leontion, in mind.
