= Boo Islands =

Coordinates: 1.15°S 129.40°E

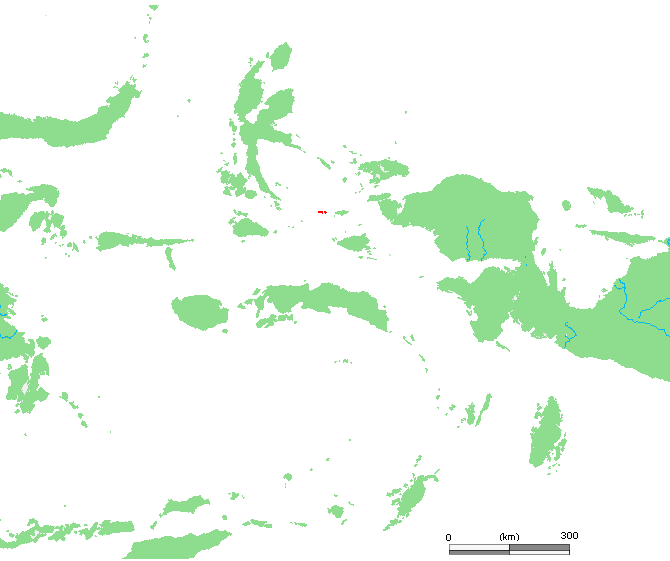
Boo islands on the edge of Southwest Papua and North Maluku, in Raja Ampat (may need to zoom)

Boo Islands (Indonesian: Kepulauan Boo) are a small group of islands in the westernmost part of Raja Ampat, Southwest Papua, Indonesia. They are situated to the west of Kofiau Island in the west of Raja Ampat Regency, and are administratively included within the Kofiau District. The main and most westerly island is Pulau Boo Besar (Great Boo), others include Pulau-Pulau Boo, Pulau Balinda, Pulau Matkamap, Pulau Taudore and Pulau Kecil (Small Boo, also called Pulau Dugong), the most easterly. The Boo Islands area includes the Kofiau–Boo Islands Marine Protected Area.
