= Kofiau monarch =

Conservation status
- Near Threatened (IUCN 3.1)

Scientific classification
- Kingdom: Animalia
- Phylum: Chordata
- Class: Aves
- Order: Passeriformes
- Family: Monarchidae
- Genus: Symposiachrus
- Species: S. julianae

Binomial name
- Symposiachrus julianae (Ripley, 1959)

Synonyms
- Monarcha julianae; Symposiarchus julianae

Species of bird

The Kofiau monarch (Symposiachrus julianae) is a species of bird in the family Monarchidae. It is endemic to Kofiau in Indonesia.

== Taxonomy and systematics ==
This species was originally classified in the genus Monarcha until moved to Symposiachrus in 2009.
