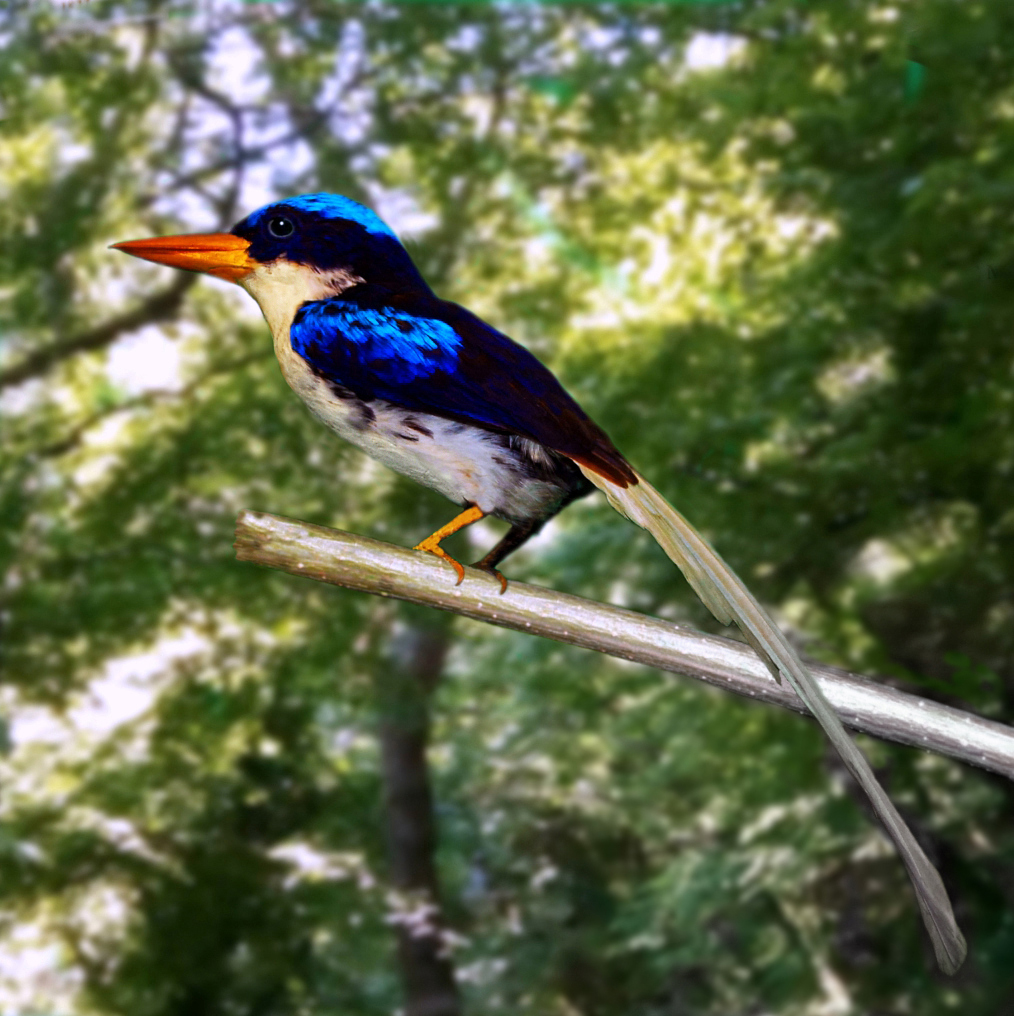
- Specimen
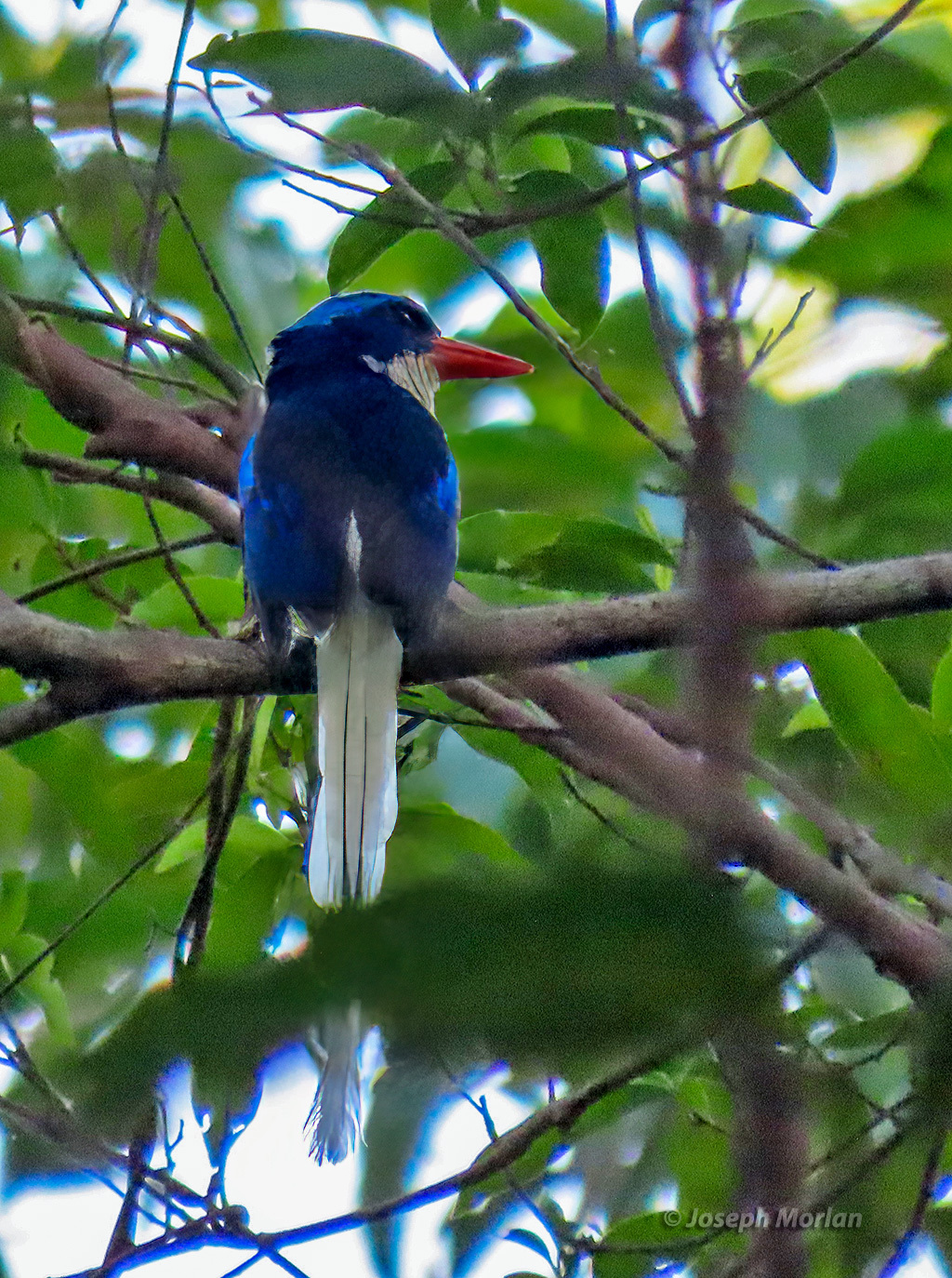
- Live bird

Conservation status
- Near Threatened (IUCN 3.1)

Scientific classification
- Kingdom: Animalia
- Phylum: Chordata
- Class: Aves
- Order: Coraciiformes
- Family: Alcedinidae
- Subfamily: Halcyoninae
- Genus: Tanysiptera
- Species: T. ellioti

Binomial name
- Tanysiptera ellioti Sharpe, 1870

= Kofiau paradise kingfisher =

Species of bird

The Kofiau paradise kingfisher (Tanysiptera ellioti) is a tree kingfisher belonging to the family Alcedinidae, subfamily Halcyoninae.

== Taxonomy ==
This little-known bird is sometimes considered a subspecies of the common paradise kingfisher (T. galatea), but it is morphologically distinct and del Hoyo lists it as a separate species.

== Distribution ==
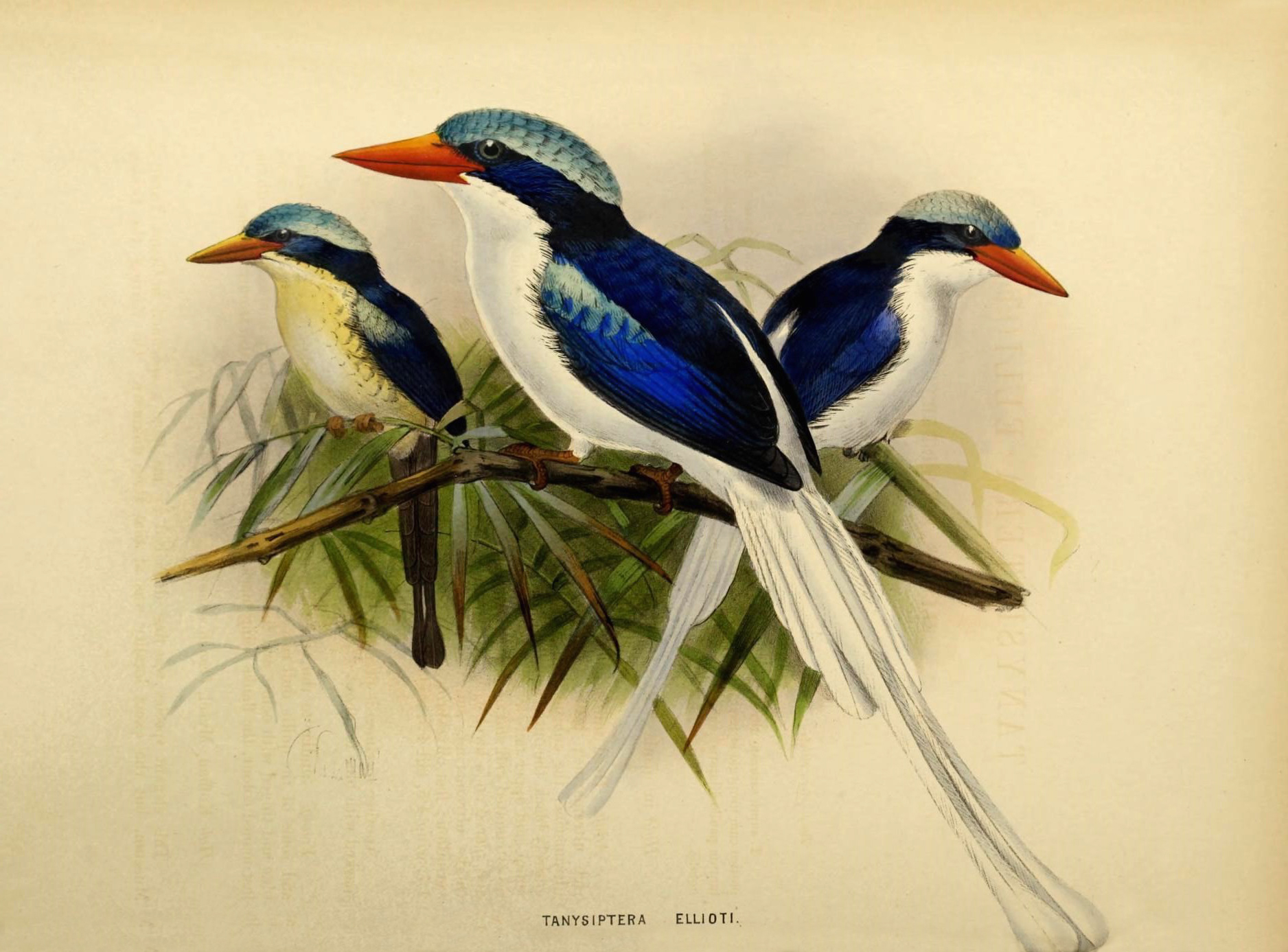
Illustration by John Gerrard Keulemans

This species is endemic to the Indonesian island Kofiau, off the west coast of New Guinea.

== Habitat ==
The Kofiau paradise kingfisher inhabits primary forest, tall secondary forest and subtropical/tropical moist lowlands. The species is also common in lightly wooded village gardens.

== Description ==
The Kofiau paradise kingfisher is about 34 cm (13.4 in) long including its elongated tail feathers, reaching 10–11 cm (3.9–4.3 in). The head and upper parts of both male and female are dark blue and the rump, tail and underparts are white. The central tail feathers are long and tapering. The bill is scarlet.

== Biology ==
It feeds on insects and worms that it catches on the ground.
