= Kofiau =

Island in Raja Ampat Regency, Southwest Papua, Indonesia

Coordinates: 1°11′S 129°50′E

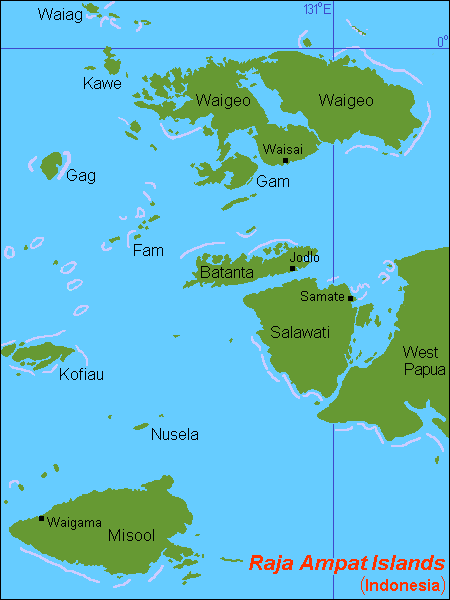
The Raja Ampat Islands. Kofiau is in the central western part of the group.

Kofiau is an island in the Raja Ampat Islands, in Southwest Papua, Indonesia. The island is primarily raised coral limestone with some volcanic hills, covered in low forest. The island is home to the endemic Kofiau paradise kingfisher and Kofiau monarch. A new form of the Green tree python has been found on Kofiau and Boo Island that retains its neotenic yellow coloration into adulthood. The island is the centre of a group of smaller islands of which the largest is Eftorabi Island to the west; the Kofiau District also includes the smaller Boo Islands further to the west of Kofiau; the district's land area covers 206.23 km^{2} and in mid 2025 held a population of 2,975 people.
