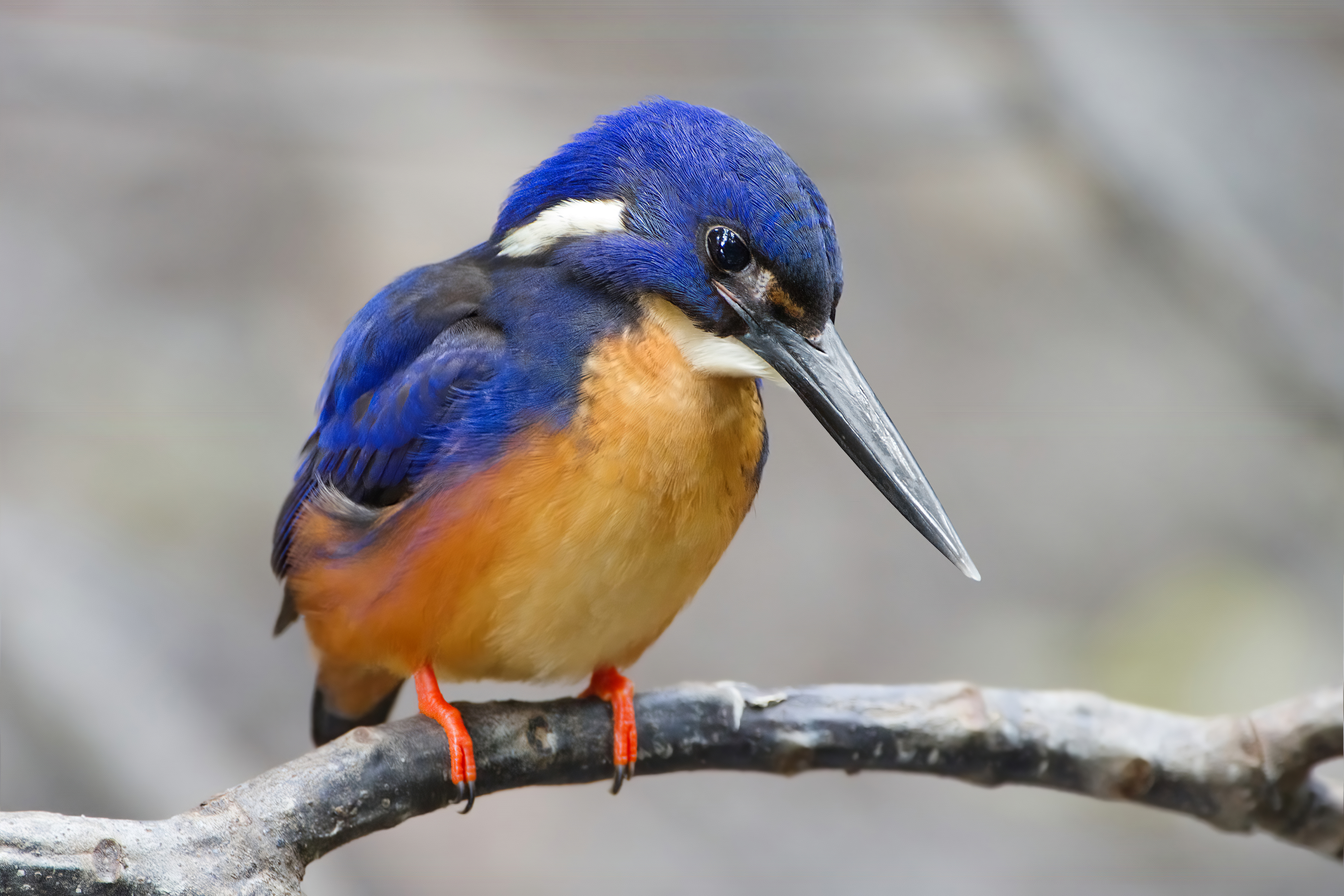
- Azure kingfisher (Ceyx azureus)

Scientific classification
- Kingdom: Animalia
- Phylum: Chordata
- Class: Aves
- Order: Coraciiformes
- Suborder: Alcedines
- Family: Alcedinidae; Rafinesque, 1815

Subfamilies
- Alcedininae; Halcyoninae; Cerylinae
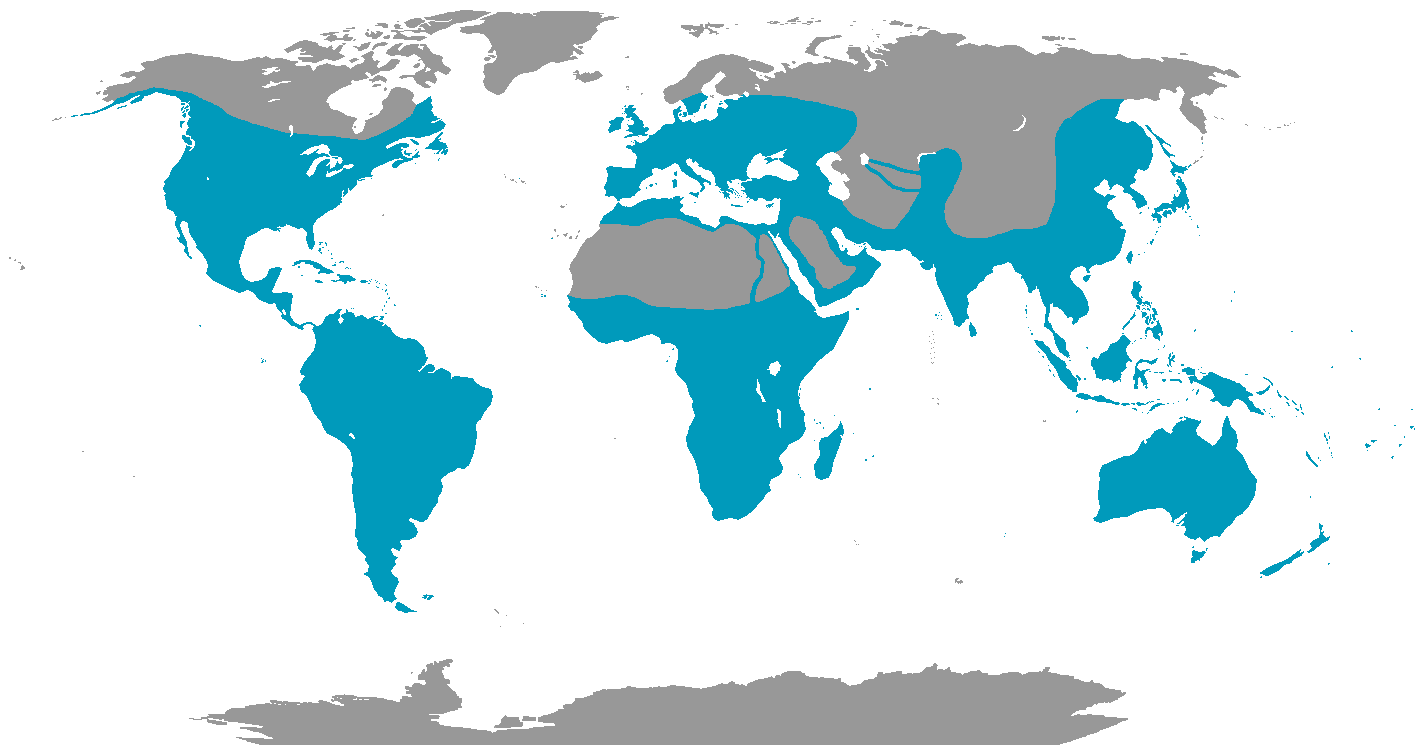
- global range of the family

= Kingfisher =

Family of birds

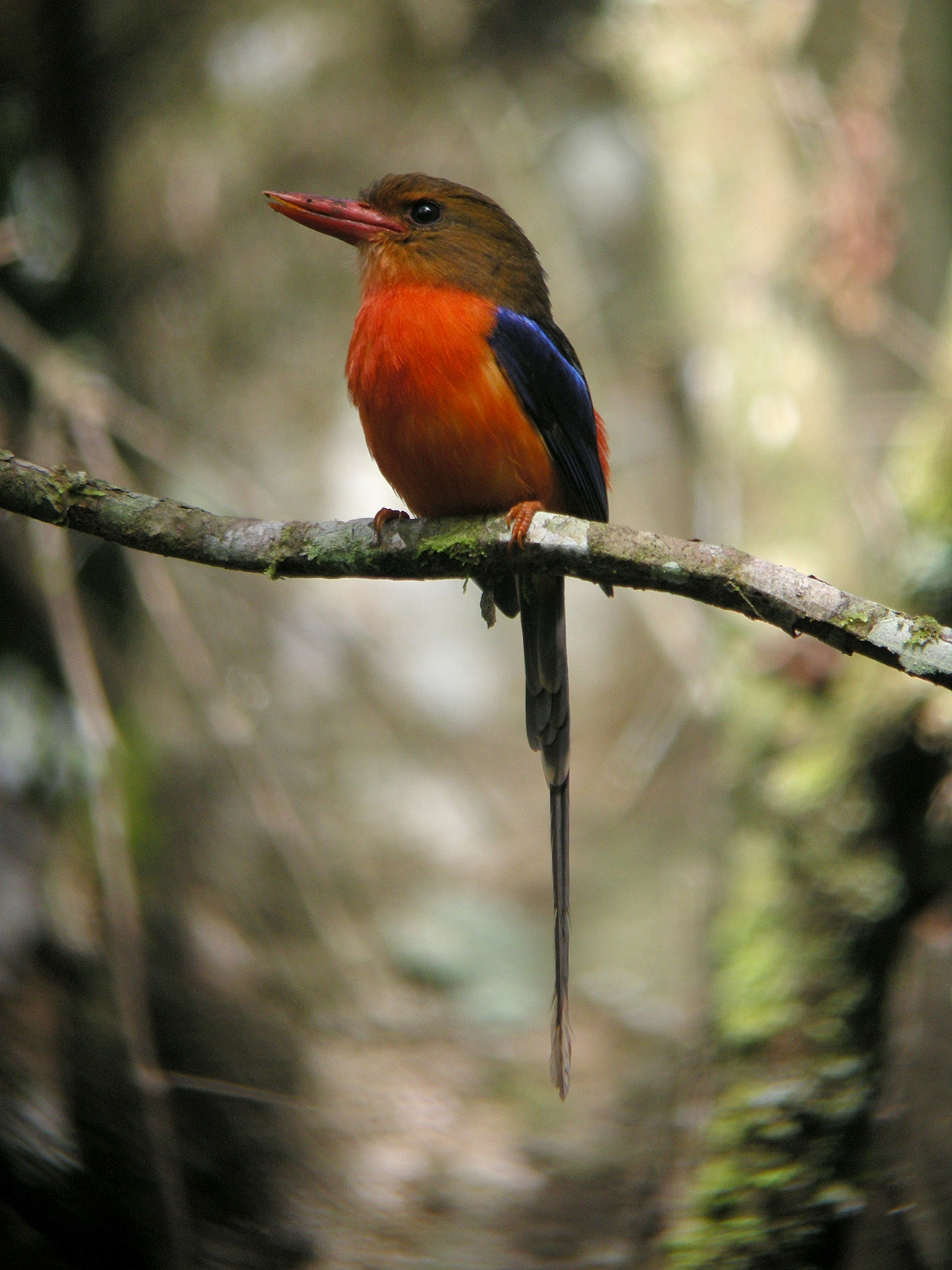
The paradise kingfishers of New Guinea have unusually long tails for the group.

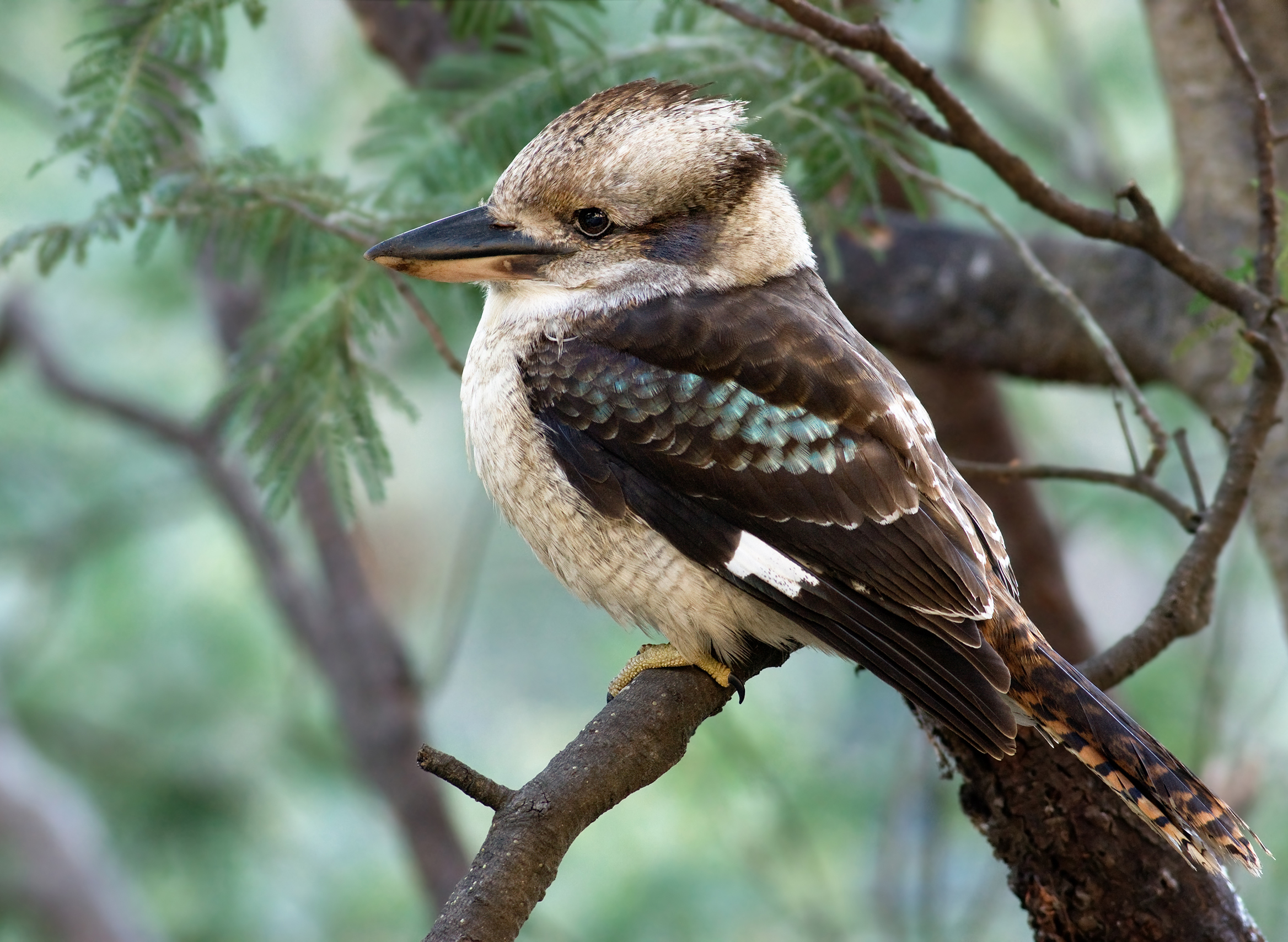
The kookaburra has a call which sounds like laughter.

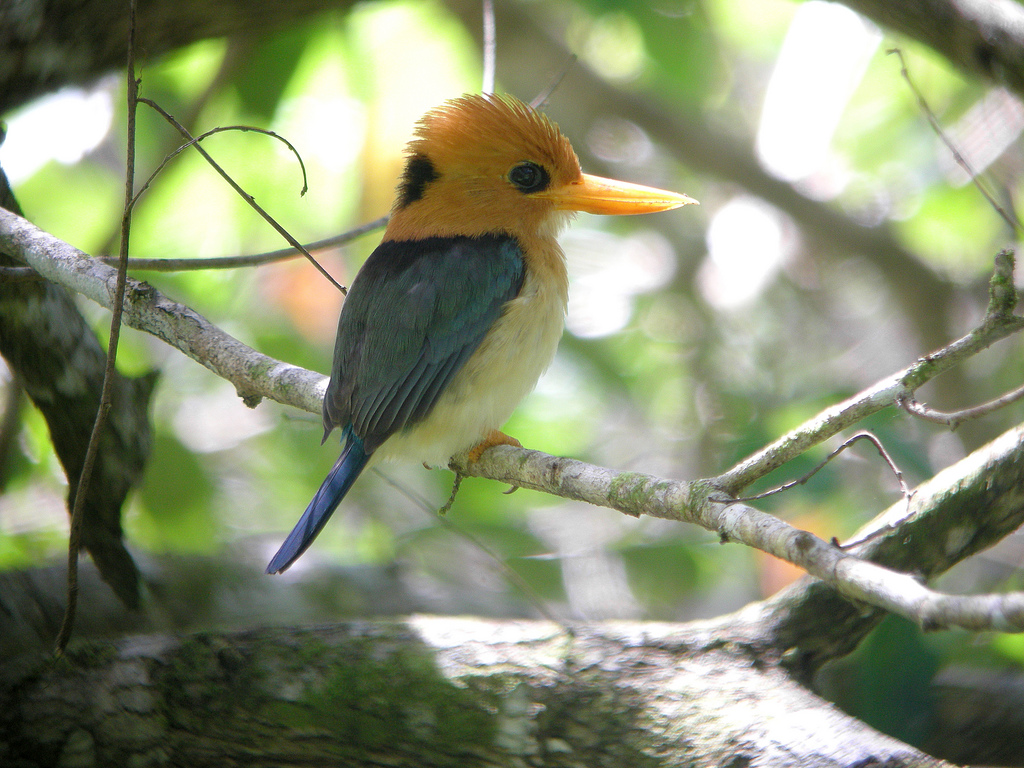
Like many forest-living kingfishers, the yellow-billed kingfisher often nests in arboreal termite nests.

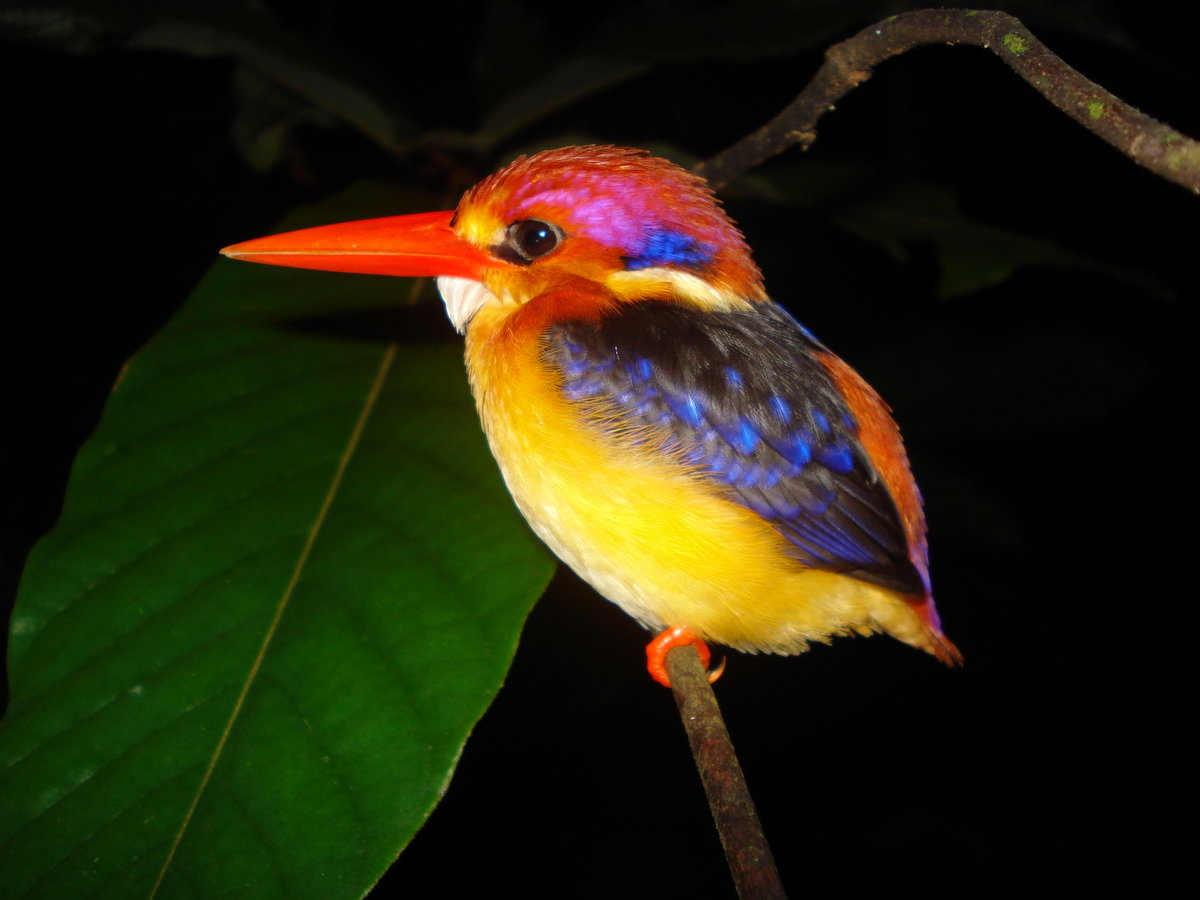
The black-backed dwarf kingfisher is considered a bad omen by warriors of the Dusun tribe of Borneo.

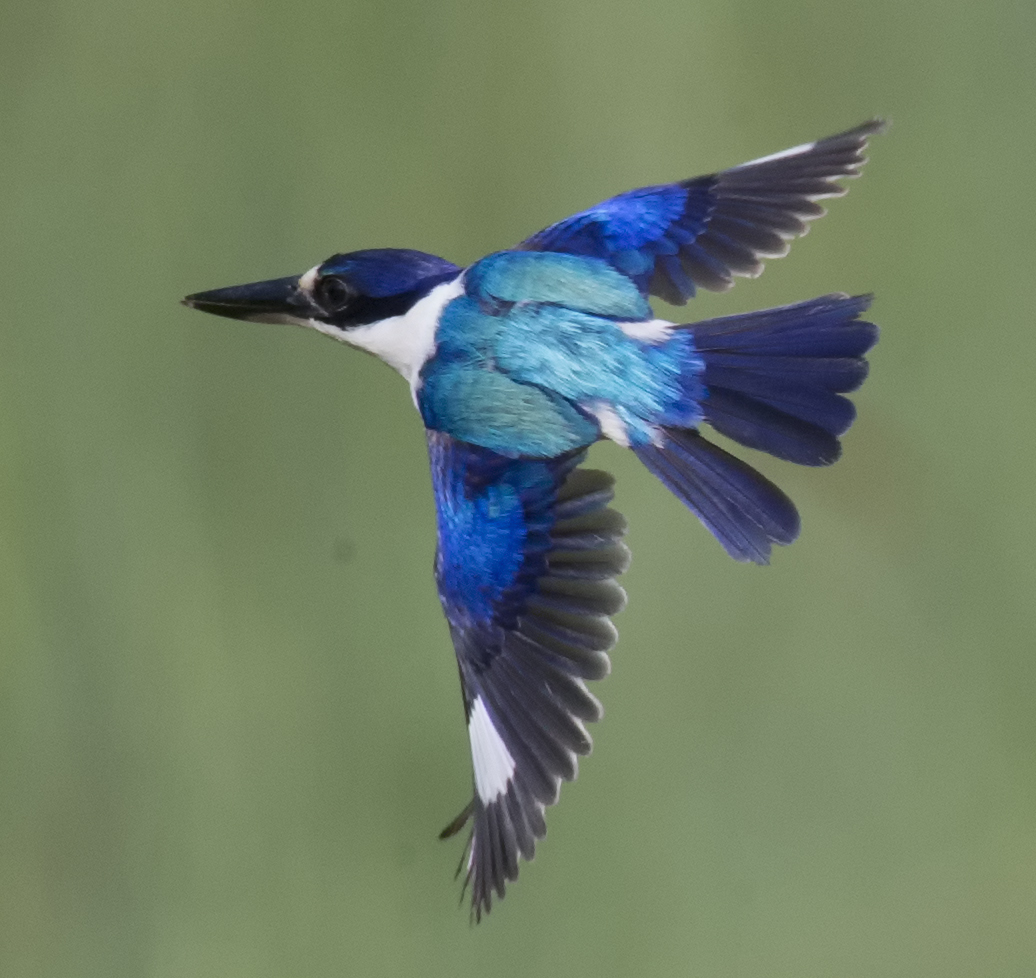
Forest kingfisher in Queensland

Kingfishers are a family, the Alcedinidae, of small to medium-sized, brightly coloured birds in the order Coraciiformes. They have a cosmopolitan distribution: most species live in the tropical regions of Africa, Asia, and Oceania, but they can also be found in Europe and the Americas. They can be found in deep forests near calm ponds and small rivers. The family contains 118 species and is divided into three subfamilies and 19 genera. All kingfishers have large heads, long, sharp, pointed bills, short legs, and stubby tails. Most species have bright plumage with only small differences between the sexes. Most species are tropical in distribution, and a slight majority are found only in forests.

They consume a wide range of prey, usually caught by swooping down from a perch. While kingfishers are usually thought to live near rivers and eat fish, many species live away from water and eat small invertebrates. Like other members of their order, they nest in cavities, usually tunnels dug into the natural or artificial banks in the ground. Some kingfishers nest in arboreal termite nests. A few species, principally insular forms, are threatened with extinction. In Britain, the word "kingfisher" normally refers to the common kingfisher.

== Taxonomy, systematics and evolution ==
The kingfisher family Alcedinidae is in the order Coraciiformes, which also includes the motmots, bee-eaters, todies, rollers, and ground-rollers. The name of the family was introduced (as Alcedia) by the French polymath Constantine Samuel Rafinesque in 1815. It is divided into three subfamilies, the tree kingfishers (Halcyoninae), the river kingfishers (Alcedininae), and the water kingfishers (Cerylinae). The name Daceloninae is sometimes used for the tree kingfisher subfamily but it was introduced by Charles Lucien Bonaparte in 1841 while Halcyoninae introduced by Nicholas Aylward Vigors in 1825 is earlier and has priority. A few taxonomists elevate the three subfamilies to family status. In spite of the word "kingfisher" in their English vernacular names, many of these birds are not specialist fish-eaters; none of the species in Halcyoninae are.

The scientific name is derived from Greek mythology and the ancient belief that the birds nested in the open sea: the Greeks called them halkyons (Latin halcyon) from hals (sea) and kyon (born). In Greek mythology the gods gave the halkyons the ability to calm the waters when nesting. In Greek mythology, one of the Pleiades named Alcyone (Alcedo in Latin) married Ceyx who was killed in a shipwreck. Alcyone drowned herself in grief and the gods revived them both as kingfishers.

The phylogenetic relationship between the kingfishers and the other five families that make up the order Coraciiformes is shown in the cladogram below. The number of species in each family is taken from the list maintained by Frank Gill, Pamela C. Rasmussen and David Donsker on behalf of the International Ornithological Committee (IOC).

- Coraciiformes
  - - Meropidae – bee-eaters (31 species)
    - - Brachypteraciidae – ground rollers (5 species)
      - Coraciidae – rollers (13 species)
  - - Todidae – todies (5 species)
    - - Momotidae – motmots (14 species)
      - Alcedinidae – kingfishers (118 species)

The centre of kingfisher diversity is the Australasian realm, but the group originated in the Indomalayan region around 27 million years ago (Mya) and invaded the Australasian realm a number of times. Fossil kingfishers have been described from Lower Eocene rocks in Wyoming and Middle Eocene rocks in Germany, around 30–40 Mya. More recent fossil kingfishers have been described in the Miocene rocks of Australia (5–25 Mya). Several fossil birds have been erroneously ascribed to the kingfishers, including Halcyornis, from the Lower Eocene rocks in Kent, which has also been considered a gull, but is now thought to have been a member of an extinct family.

Amongst the three subfamilies, the Alcedininae are basal to the other two subfamilies. The few species found in the Americas, all from the subfamily Cerylinae, suggest that the sparse representation in the Western Hemisphere resulted from just two original colonising events. The subfamily is a comparatively recent split from the Halcyoninae, diversifying in the Old World as recently as the Miocene or Pliocene.

The following cladogram is based on a molecular phylogenetic study published in 2017.

- Alcedinidae
  - Alcedininae
    - - Ispidina – 2 species
      - Corythornis – 4 species
    - - Alcedo – 7 species
      - Ceyx – 21 species
  - - Cerylinae
      - Megaceryle – 4 species
      - - Ceryle – pied kingfisher
        - Chloroceryle – 4 species
    - Halcyoninae
      - - Lacedo – banded kingfisher
        - - Pelargopsis – 3 species
          - Halcyon – 12 species
      - - - Cittura – 2 species (lilac kingfishers)
          - Tanysiptera – 9 species (paradise kingfishers)
        - - - - Melidora – hook-billed kingfisher
              - Dacelo (includes Clytoceyx) – 5 species (kookaburras)
            - Actenoides (includes Caridonax) – 6 species
          - - Syma – 2 species
            - Todiramphus – 30 species

== Description ==
The smallest species of kingfisher is the African dwarf kingfisher (Ispidina lecontei), which averages 10 cm (3.9 in) in length and between 9 and 12 g (0.32 and 0.42 oz) in weight. The largest kingfisher in Africa is the giant kingfisher (Megaceryle maxima), which is 42 to 46 cm (17 to 18 in) in length and 255–426 g (9.0–15.0 oz) in weight. The common Australian kingfisher, known as the laughing kookaburra (Dacelo novaeguineae), is the heaviest species, with females reaching nearly 500 g (18 oz) in weight.

The plumage of most kingfishers is bright, with green and blue being the most common colours. The brightness of the colours is neither the product of iridescence (except in the American kingfishers) or pigments but is instead caused by the structure of the feathers, which causes scattering of blue light (the Tyndall effect). In most species, sexual dimorphism is limited. When clear distinctions do occur, size differences between the sexes generally remain minimal.

The kingfishers have long, dagger-like bills. The bill is usually longer and more compressed in species that hunt fish, and shorter and more broad in species that hunt prey off the ground. The largest and most atypical bill is that of the shovel-billed kookaburra, which is used to dig through the forest floor in search of prey. They generally have short legs, although species that feed on the ground have longer tarsi. Most species have four toes, three of which are forward-pointing and fused towards the base ("syndactyl") to some extent.

The irises of most species are dark brown. The kingfishers have excellent vision; they are capable of binocular vision and are thought in particular to have good colour vision. They have restricted movement of their eyes within the eye sockets, instead using head movements to track prey. In addition, they are capable of compensating for the refraction of water and reflection when hunting prey underwater, and are able to judge depth under water accurately. They also have nictitating membranes that cover the eyes to protect them when they hit the water; the pied kingfisher has a bony plate, which slides across the eye when it hits the water.

== Distribution and habitat ==
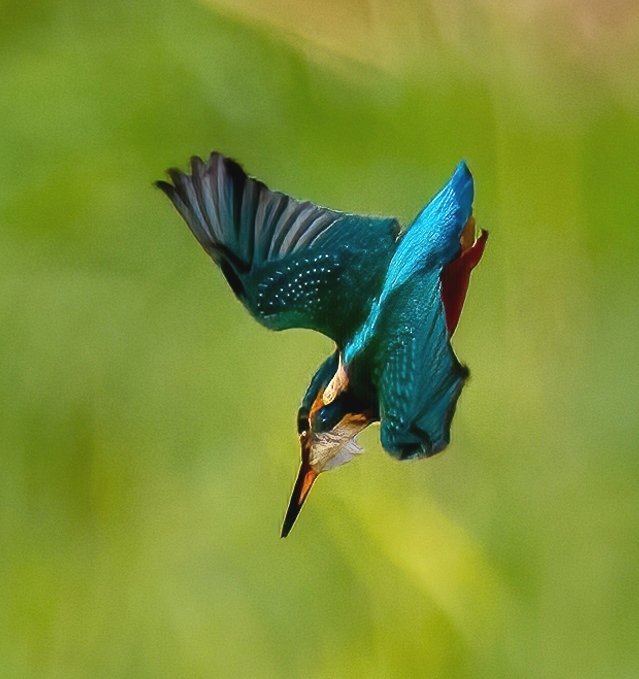
Alcedo atthis diving towards prey

The kingfishers have a cosmopolitan distribution, occurring throughout the world's tropical and temperate regions. They are absent from the polar regions and some of the world's driest deserts. Several species have reached islands groups, particularly those in the south and east Pacific Ocean. The Old World tropics and Australasia are the core areas for this group. Europe and North America north of Mexico are very poorly represented, with only one common kingfisher (common kingfisher and belted kingfisher, respectively), and two uncommon or very local species each: (ringed kingfisher and green kingfisher in the southwestern United States, pied kingfisher and white-throated kingfisher in southeastern Europe). The six species occurring in the Americas are four closely related green kingfishers in the genus Chloroceryle and two large crested kingfishers in the genus Megaceryle. Even tropical South America has only five species plus the wintering belted kingfisher. In comparison, the African country of the Gambia has eight resident species in its 120-by-20-mile (193 by 32 km) area.

Individual species may have massive ranges, like the common kingfisher, which ranges from Ireland across Europe, North Africa, and Asia as far as the Solomon Islands in Australasia, or the pied kingfisher, which has a widespread distribution across Africa and Asia. Other species have much smaller ranges, particularly insular species which are endemic to single small islands. The Kofiau paradise kingfisher is restricted to the island of Kofiau off New Guinea.

Kingfishers occupy a wide range of habitats. While they are often associated with rivers and lakes, over half the world's species are found in forests and forested streams. They also occupy a wide range of other habitats. The red-backed kingfisher of Australia lives in the driest deserts, although kingfishers are absent from other dry deserts like the Sahara. Other species live high in mountains, or in open woodland, and a number of species live on tropical coral atolls. Numerous species have adapted to human-modified habitats, particularly those adapted to woodlands, and may be found in cultivated and agricultural areas, as well as parks and gardens in towns and cities.

== Behaviour and ecology ==
=== Diet and feeding ===
Kingfisher catching fish, eating, defecating, and flying in Kõrvemaa, Estonia (October 2022)

Kingfishers feed on a wide variety of prey. They are most famous for hunting and eating fish, and some species do specialise in catching fish, but other species take crustaceans, frogs and other amphibians, annelid worms, molluscs, insects, spiders, centipedes, reptiles (including snakes), and even birds and mammals. Individual species may specialise in a few items or take a wide variety of prey, and for species with large global distributions, different populations may have different diets. Woodland and forest kingfishers take mainly insects, particularly grasshoppers, whereas the water kingfishers are more specialised in taking fish. The red-backed kingfisher has been observed hammering into the mud nests of fairy martins to feed on their nestlings. Kingfishers usually hunt from an exposed perch; when a prey item is observed, the kingfisher swoops down to snatch it, then returns to the perch. Kingfishers of all three families beat larger prey against a perch to kill the prey and to dislodge or break protective spines and bones. Having beaten the prey, it is manipulated and then swallowed. Sometimes, a pellet of bones, scales, and other indigestible debris is coughed up. The shovel-billed kookaburra uses its massive, wide bill as a shovel to dig for worms in soft mud.

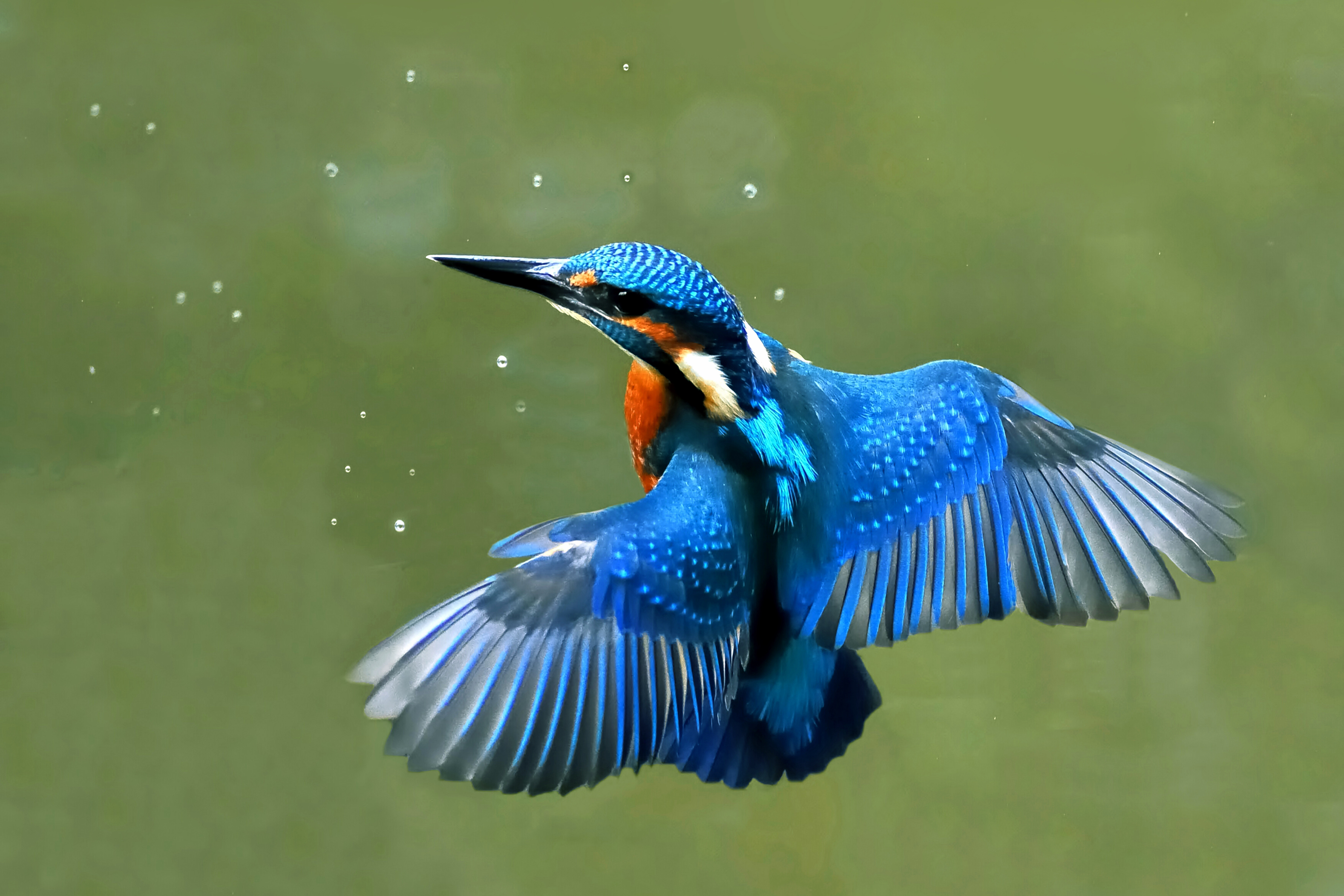
Common kingfisher hovering

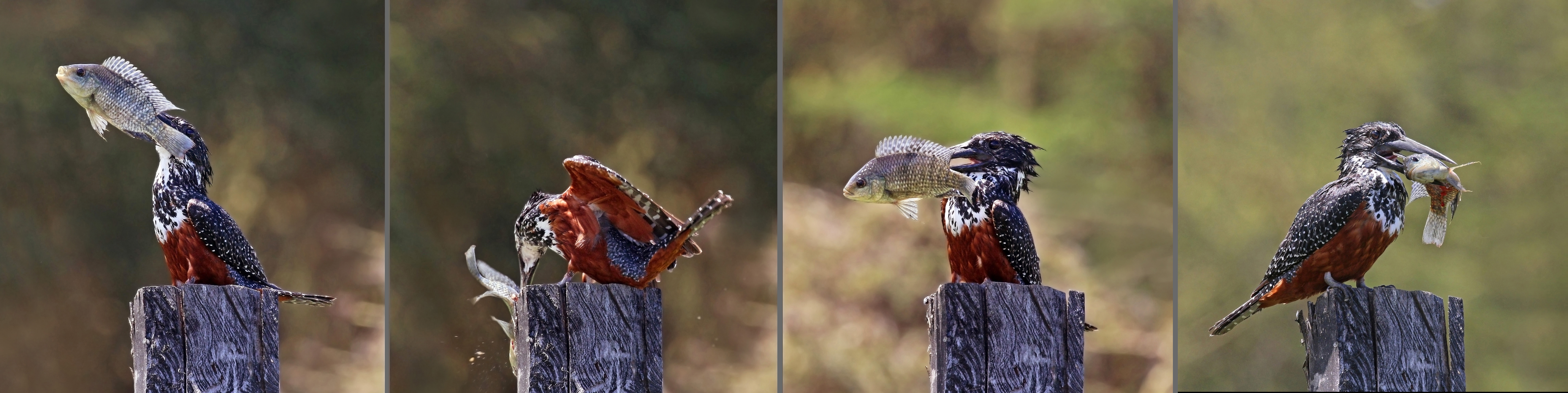
Giant kingfisher breaking spine of tilapia fish

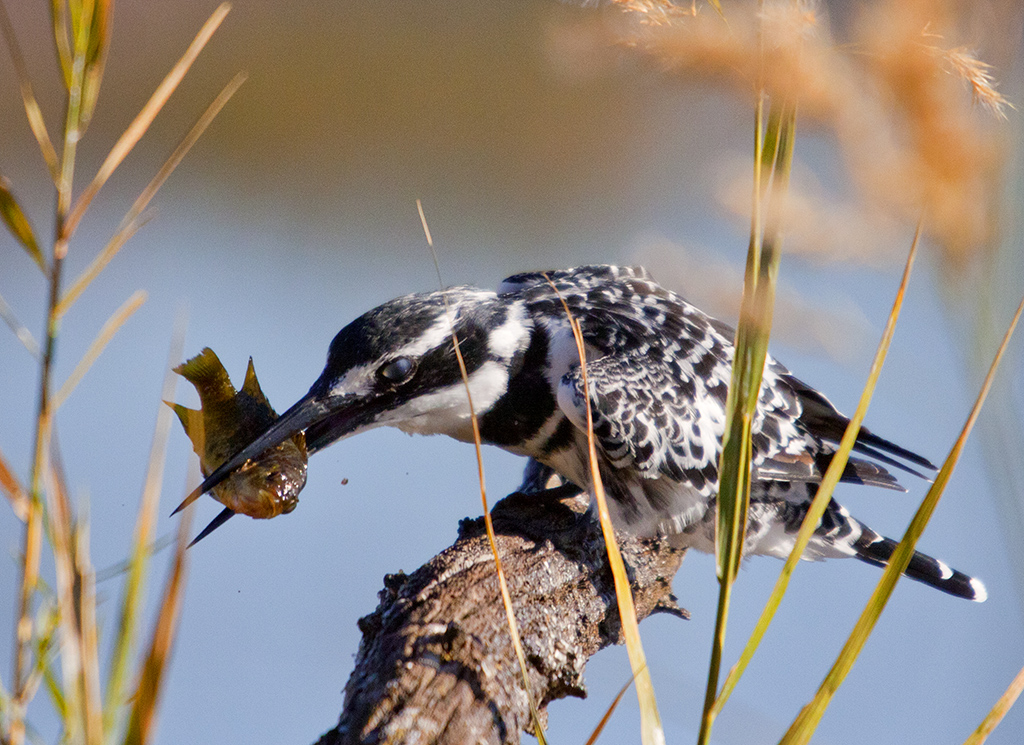
Pied kingfisher killing a fish

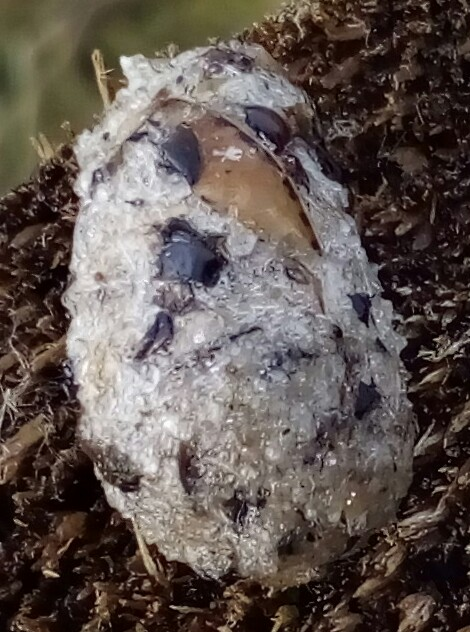
Pellet of a common kingfisher

=== Breeding ===
Kingfishers are territorial, some species defending their territories vigorously. They are generally monogamous, although cooperative breeding has been observed in some species and is quite common in others, for example the laughing kookaburra, where helpers aid the dominant breeding pair in raising the young.

Like all Coraciiformes, the kingfishers are cavity nesters, as well as tree nesters, with most species nesting in holes dug in the ground. These holes are usually in earth banks on the sides of rivers, lakes or man-made ditches. Some species may nest in holes in trees, the earth clinging to the roots of an uprooted tree, or arboreal nests of termites (termitarium). The use of termite nests is common in forest species. The nests take the form of a small chamber at the end of a tunnel. Nest-digging duties are shared between the sexes. During the initial excavations, the bird may fly at the chosen site with considerable force, and birds have injured themselves fatally while doing this. The length of the tunnels varies by species and location; nests in termitaria are necessarily much shorter than those dug into the earth, and nests in harder substrates are shorter than those in soft soil or sand. The longest tunnels recorded are those of the giant kingfisher, which have been found to be 8.5 m (28 ft) long.

The eggs of kingfishers are invariably white. The typical clutch size varies by species; some of the very large and very small species lay as few as two eggs per clutch, whereas others may lay 10 eggs, the typical is around three to six eggs. Both sexes incubate the eggs. The offspring of the kingfisher usually stay with the parents for 3–4 months.

== Status and conservation ==
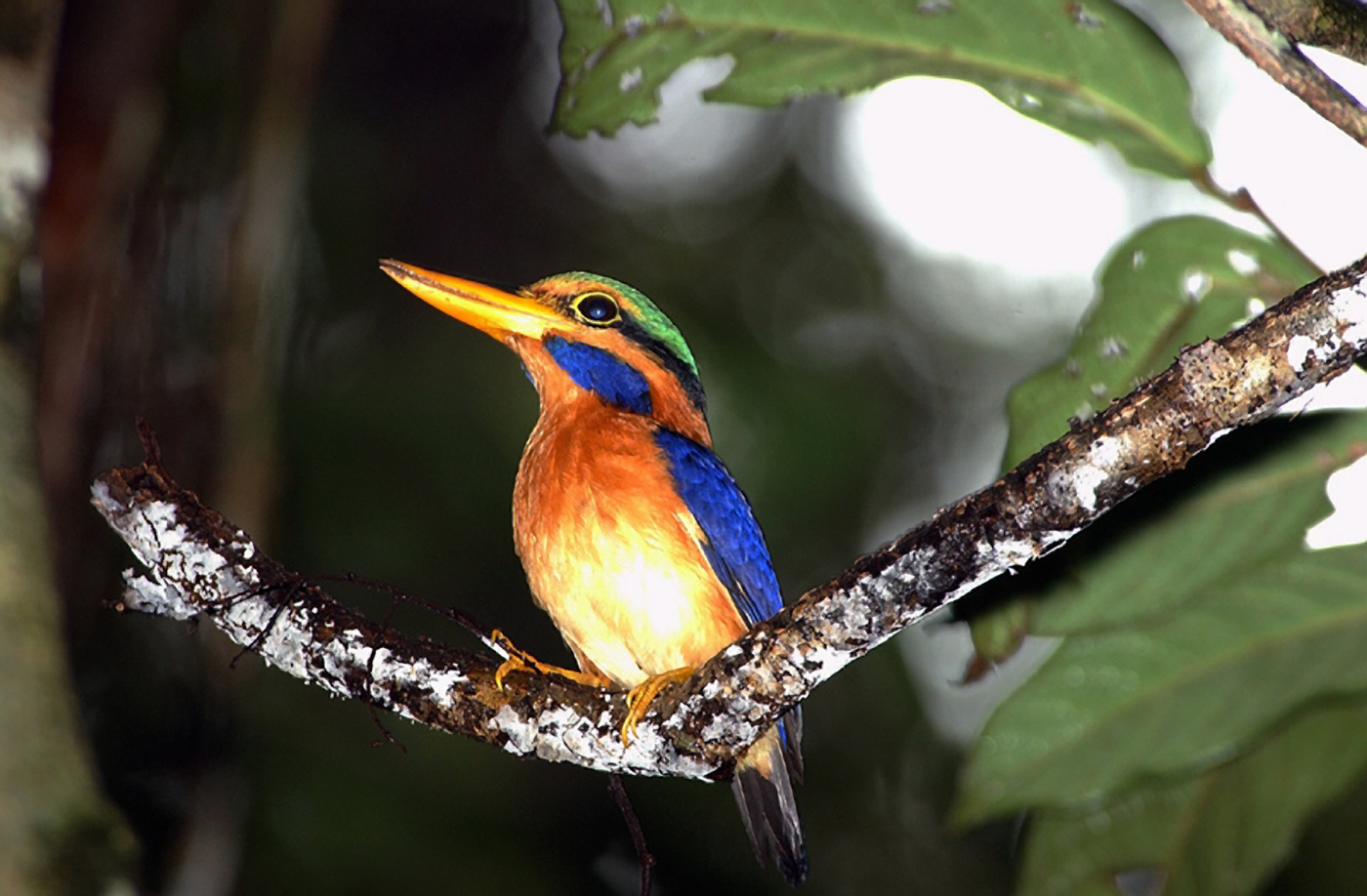
The rufous-collared kingfisher is categorised as near-threatened due to the rapid loss of its rainforest habitat.

A number of species are considered threatened by human activities and are in danger of extinction. Most of these are forest species with limited distribution, particularly insular species. They are threatened by habitat loss caused by forest clearance or degradation and in some cases by introduced species. The Marquesan kingfisher of French Polynesia is listed as critically endangered due to a combination of habitat loss and degradation caused by introduced cattle, and possibly due to predation by introduced species.

== Relationship with humans ==
Kingfishers are generally shy birds, but in spite of this, they feature heavily in human culture, generally due to the large head supporting its powerful mouth, their bright plumage, or some species' interesting behavior.

For the Dusun people of Borneo, the oriental dwarf kingfisher is considered a bad omen, and warriors who see one on the way to battle should return home. Another Bornean tribe considers the banded kingfisher an omen bird, albeit generally a good omen.

The sacred kingfisher, along with other Pacific kingfishers, was venerated by the Polynesians, who believed it had control over the seas and waves. As a symbol of dexterity and wisdom, kingfishers also inspire literary works from the Southeast Asian region, such as Wild Wise Weird: The Kingfisher Story Collection.

Modern taxonomy also refers to the winds and sea in naming kingfishers after a classical Greek myth. The first pair of the mythical-bird Halcyon (kingfishers) were created from a marriage of Alcyone and Ceyx. As gods, they lived the sacrilege of referring to themselves as Zeus and Hera. They died for this, but the other gods, in an act of compassion, made them into birds, thus restoring them to their original seaside habitat. In addition, special "halcyon days" were granted. These are the seven days on either side of the winter solstice when storms shall never again occur for them. The Halcyon birds' "days" were for caring for the winter-hatched clutch (or brood), but the phrase "Halcyon days" also refers specifically to an idyllic time in the past, or in general to a peaceful time. In another version, a woman named Alcyone was cast into the waves by her father for her promiscuity and was turned into a kingfisher.

Various kinds of kingfishers and human cultural artifacts are named after the couple, in reference to this metamorphosis myth:

- The genus Ceyx (within the river kingfishers family) is named after him.
- The kingfisher subfamily Halcyoninae (tree kingfishers) is named after his wife, as is the genus Halcyon.
- The belted kingfisher's specific name (Megaceryle alcyon) also references her name.

Not all the kingfishers are named in this way. The etymology of kingfisher (Alcedo atthis) is obscure; the term comes from "king's fisher", but why that name was applied is not known.

=== Mascot ===
There is a campaign to make the belted kingfisher the official mascot of the University of Illinois Urbana-Champaign. Students and alumni in support of the proposed mascot have noted that female belted kingfishers are orange and blue, which corresponds to the University’s colors. Multiple Indigenous organizations and the Audubon have endorsed the proposed mascot which seeks to fill the absence of the removed Chief Illiniwek mascot. A kingfisher costumed mascot has been created and has made appearances at campus events, although the mascot is not yet official. If approved, it would be the first University in the US to have a Kingfisher mascot.

== Sources ==
- Bock, Walter J. (1994). History and Nomenclature of Avian Family-Group Names. Bulletin of the American Museum of Natural History. Vol. 222. New York: American Museum of Natural History. hdl:2246/830.
- Fry, C. Hilary; Fry, Kathie; Harris, Alan (1992). Kingfishers, Bee-eaters, and Rollers. London: Christopher Helm. ISBN 978-0-7136-8028-7.
