= Weigh (disambiguation) =

To weigh something is to measure its weight.

Weigh may also refer to:

== Naval ==
- Weigh anchor, the process of raising a ship's anchor in preparation for departure, or the events during or prior
- Weigh lock, a type of canal lock used to determine the weight of barges or ships

== People ==
- Stephen Weigh (born 1987), Australian professional basketball player

== Weight related ==
- Weigh-in, in boxing, wrestling, bodybuilding, etc., the process or event of measuring a potential competitor's weight to determine his or her correct weight class
- Weigh bridge or truck scale, a device to weigh large vehicles
- Weigh house, a building within which items are weighed, typically goods to be sold by weight

== See also ==
- WAE (disambiguation)
- Way (disambiguation)
- Wei (disambiguation)
- Wey (disambiguation)
- Whey
