= WAE =

WAE or wae may refer to:

== Places ==
- Waterloo East railway station (National Rail station code WAE), London, England, UK
- Wadi al-Dawasir Domestic Airport (IATA airport code WAE), Riyadh Province, Saudi Arabia
- Wa (Japan), the oldest recorded name of Japan
- Kawa River (also called Wae), Seram Island, Maluku, Indonesia

== Linguistics ==
- Wae (hangul) (ㅙ), a Korean character and syllable in Hangul
- wae (Hawaiian word), the term in Hawai'ian for a hull spreader in an Outrigger_canoe
- Walser German (ISO 639 language code wae)

== Other uses ==
- World Association in Economics
- Walking Across Egypt, a 1999 American film
- Wireless Application Environment, part of the Wireless Application Protocol suite
- Fortescue Zero, formerly Williams Advanced Engineering and WAE Technologies

== See also ==
- WÆE (band), a Swedish band
- Wae Rana language (Kolor; ISO 639 language code wrx)
- Wae Sama language (Buru; ISO 639 language code mhs)
- Waes (disambiguation)
- WAEE (disambiguation)
- Way (disambiguation)
- Whey (disambiguation)
