= We (disambiguation) =

We is the nominative case of the first-person plural pronoun in the English language.

We or WE may also refer to:

== Arts and entertainment ==
=== Film and television ===
- We (1982 film), a German film based on the 1921 novel by Yevgeny Zamyatin
- W.E., a 2011 film directed by Madonna
- We (2018 film), a Belgian–Dutch drama film
- We (unreleased film), a Russian film based on the 1921 novel by Yevgeny Zamyatin
- We TV, an American pay television channel

=== Games ===
- Winning Eleven, an original name for Pro Evolution Soccer video game series

=== Literature ===
- We (novel), a 1921 novel by Yevgeny Zamyatin
- "WE" (1927 book), an autobiography of Charles Lindbergh
- We or Our Nationhood Defined or We, a 1939 book by Indian Hindu nationalist M. S. Golwalkar

=== Music ===
==== Performers ====
- We (band), a Norwegian rock band

==== Songs ====
- "We", a song by The Roches from their self-titled album
- "We", a song by Joy Williams from Genesis (Joy Williams album)
- "We", a song by Leo Ieiri from the eponymous album
- "We", a song by Sybil from Doin' It Now!
- "We" (song), a song by South Korean girl group Pledis Girlz

==== Albums ====
- We, a 2011 album by Van Bod
- We (Leo Ieiri album), a 2016 album by Leo Ieiri
- We (EXID EP), a 2019 EP by EXID
- We (Winner EP), a 2019 EP by Winner
- We (Arcade Fire album), a 2022 album by Arcade Fire

== Businesses ==
- WE, an Egyptian mobile service brand owned by Telecom Egypt
- WE (clothing), a Dutch clothing brand
- WESC, a Swedish clothing brand often known as "We"
- WeWork (NYSE: WE), an American commercial real estate company
- Wheeling and Lake Erie Railway (1990) (reporting mark: WE), Ohio and Pennsylvania, US
- Parata Air (IATA code: WE), a Korean low-cost airline
- Centurion Air Cargo (former IATA code: WE), a former US cargo airline
- Thai Smile (former IATA code: WE), a former Thai regional airline
- WE Charity, a youth charity

== Language ==
- We (kana), an obsolete Japanese character
- Wè language, a language of Côte d'Ivoire
- Royal we, the use of a plural pronoun by a single person referring to themselves
- We (Cyrillic), the Cyrillic letter We

== Other uses ==
- Wé, a town in the Loyalty Islands Province of New Caledonia
- W_{e}, a unit for the electrical Watt
- We-psychology, a theory of character development by Fritz Kunkel
- Wednesday

== See also ==
- Wee (disambiguation)
- Wei (disambiguation)
- Wie (disambiguation), sometimes pronounced similarly to "we"
- Wii (pronounced "we"), Nintendo's fifth video game console
- Oui (disambiguation), the French word for yes that is pronounced similarly
