= WAEE =

WAEE, Waee, or, variant, may refer to:

- Waee music, a style of Sindhi music
- WÆE (band), a SWedish pop band
- Sultan Babullah Airport (ICAO airport code WAEE), North Maluku, Indonesia

== See also ==
- WAE (disambiguation)
- Wee (disambiguation)
