= List of rivers of Maluku (province) =

Major rivers of Maluku province

List of rivers flowing in the province of Maluku, Indonesia:

== In alphabetical order ==
- Eti River
- Kawa River
- Masiwang River
- Sapalewa River
- Salawai River
- Sikula River
- Tala River
- Waeapo River

== By Island ==
=== Ambon ===
- Sikula

=== Buru ===
- Waeapo

=== Seram ===
- Eti
- Kawa
- Masiwang
- Sapalewa
- Salawai
- Tala

== See also ==
- List of drainage basins of Indonesia
- List of rivers of Indonesia
