= Masiwang =

Masiwang may be,

- Masiwang River
- Masiwang language
