= Waes =

Waes may refer to:

- WAES (FM), a former high school radio station
- Pays de Waes (locomotive), a preserved tank locomotive built in 1844
- Sint-Gillis-Waas (French: Saint-Gilles-Waes), a Belgian municipality
- Aert van Waes, Dutch Golden Age painter
- Edmond Vanwaes, also Van Waes, a Belgian rower
- Tom Waes, Belgian television presenter and actor
- WAES, Westminster Adult Education Service, London UK

== See also ==
- WAE (disambiguation) including "Wae"
- Ways (disambiguation)
