= Maluku sectarian conflict =

Religious conflict in Indonesia

- Part of the post-Suharto era in Indonesia
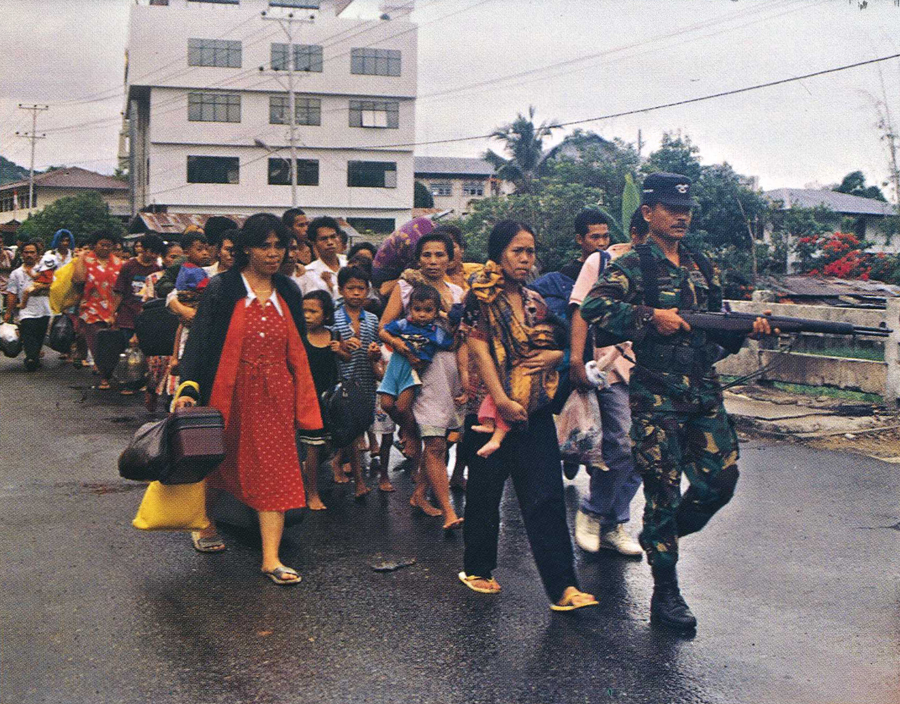
- Indonesian military forces evacuating refugees from Ambon during the conflict in 1999.
- Date: 14 January 1999 – 13 February 2002
- Location: Maluku Islands (with particularly serious disturbances in Ambon and Halmahera islands)
- Caused by: Ethnic tensions Transmigration; Jihadism; South Maluku separatism
- Methods: Territorial acquisition, riots, pogroms, bombings, protests, expulsion
- Result: Malino II Accord

Parties
- Muslim society and Islamists in Maluku
- Laskar Jihad
- Islamic Defenders Front
- Jemaah Islamiyah
- Laskar Mujahidin
- Pasukan Jihad
- Desa Sabaleh
- Laskar Mujahida
- Christian society in Maluku
- Laskar Kristus
- Maluku Sovereignty Front
- Brigade Manguni
- Pasukan Merah
Government of Indonesia
Indonesian National Armed Forces
Indonesian National Police
Pancasila Youth
- Pasukan Kuning

Lead figures
Ja'far Umar Thalib; Jumu Tuani; Rizieq Shihab; Abu Bakar Ba'asyir; Abu Bakar Wahid; Haris Fadillah †	Agus Wattimena †; Berty Loupatty; Benny Bitjara; Alex Manuputty; Tonaas Wangko Lendy Wangke	Abdurrahman Wahid; Wiranto

Number
20,000	700	

Casualties and losses
200 killed (Claim by Muhammed Selang); 3,000 killed (Claim by a Christian Militia leader)	200–5,000 killed (according Masariku Network)	Unknown

Casualties
- Deaths: 5,000 - 10,000 killed 57–445 churches burnt and destroyed 45 Mosques burnt

The Maluku sectarian conflict (Indonesian: Konflik Sektarian Kepulauan Maluku), also known as the Maluku riots (Indonesian: Kerusuhan Maluku) was a period of ethno-political conflict along religious lines that occurred in the Maluku Islands in Indonesia, with particularly serious disturbances on the islands of Ambon and Halmahera. The duration of the conflict is generally dated from the start of the Reformasi era in early 1999 to the signing of the Malino II Accord on 13 February 2002.

The principal causes of the conflict are attributed to general political and economic instability in Indonesia following the fall of Suharto and the devaluation of the rupiah during and after a wider economic crisis in Southeast Asia. The forthcoming division of the existing province of Maluku into the new provinces of Maluku and North Maluku exacerbated existing district political disputes further and, as the political dispute had been characterized along religious lines, inter-communal fighting broke out between Christian and Muslim communities in January 1999, cascading into what could be described as all-out warfare and atrocities against the civilian population committed by both sides. The main belligerents were therefore religious militia from both faiths, including the well-organised Islamist Laskar Jihad, and Indonesian government military forces.

== Overview ==
Though all violence during the four-year period cannot be linked directly to political or sectarian issues, as a significant majority could be attributed to opportunistic crimes, the violence was categorized by the armed campaigns of local militia groups targeted almost exclusively against the civilian populations of the islands. This also included the Laskar Jihad militia group, composed of trained fighters from other predominantly Muslim areas of Indonesia, who ran a campaign in the later stages of the conflict to drive out Christian residents of Maluku. On the other hand, in several cases, Christian militias also carried out attacks and massacres against Muslims, precisely on Eid al-Fitr, January 19, 1999 in Tobelo. The nature of the violence was intended to displace members of the rival community, as it assumed the form of mass-evictions through the use of intimidation and harassment, followed by vicious attacks on large groups of locals and arson attacks on their residences or even whole neighbourhoods that could be termed as pogroms in some cases. In one instance in April 1999 all Christian residents were expelled from the Banda Islands.

Despite firing some 80% of all ammunition spent in the fighting, the Police and Armed forces of the Republic of Indonesia claimed to be neutral throughout the conflict. However, the authorities were criticized for not preventing attacks and allegations of ethnic and religious bias were alleged by both communities, in particular that a number of troops handed over state-owned weapons, mostly to Muslim militia members, and said weapons were used in later attacks and atrocities. In some cases individual personnel of both the military and police are reported to have joined the militias of their respective religion, with up to 350 military personnel alleged to have assisted and fought alongside Muslim fighters. Initially the local militia groups had organised themselves as 'defenders' and 'protectors' of their respective community against rival attacks, establishing posko or command posts in light of the Police inaction, however, these rapidly evolved into mobilization points for local gangs to launch attacks from.

The conflict had a significant effect upon the 2.1 million people of greater Maluku. Leading up to the Malino agreement, the International Crisis Group estimated that 700,000 people had been displaced by the four years of fighting in the Moluccas which is thought to have claimed a minimum of 5,000 lives. This constituted the largest movement of refugees since the federation of the Indonesian state and the majority of the 1.4 million internal refugees reported in February 2002 by the World Food Programme.

== Background ==
=== Political and economic factors ===
Decentralisation stimulated a renewed effort in 1998 for the northern islands of Maluku to secede from Maluku province. The secession was supported on all sides of the religious and political spectrum as residents shared the same concerns of relative logistical difficulties associated with distances in the region, the expropriation of economic wealth by outside individuals and a distant and disengaged government in Ambon. The movement was crucially backed by then governor of Maluku province, Saleh Latuconsina, and following lobbying by prominent North Maluku parliamentarians and student activists, in February 1999, then president Jusuf Habibie promised to create a new North Maluku province.

The authoritarian rule of Suharto, to which the Christian and Muslim religious hierarchies of Al-Khaira'at and Gereja Protestan Maluku had been subordinate, had granted the groups niches of coercive power over their respective communities and guaranteed a relatively stable structure of local assemblies and distribution of power for the previous few decades. Identifying oneself with the religious establishment that held the political power allowed one to access a network that provided favours, protection from crime and other practical benefits for its members and, it has been suggested by political scientist Gerry van Klinken, this network allowed small disagreements on the street level to spread across much of Maluku society.

However, the fall of the nationwide New Order structure and decentralisation allowed open and competitive electoral competition for district positions of authority, which held both prestige and economic advantages, cast doubt on the number of voters each group could claim to command and it was within the best interests of all significant groups to mobilize support for their respective cause.

In the soon to be established North Maluku province competition for the newly created administrative positions was largely between gubernatorial candidates the sultan of Ternate, Mudaffar Sjah, who relied upon the support of the influential Evangelical Church of Halmahera (GMIH), and the Makianese Muslim regent of Central Halmahera, Bahar Andili. The redrawing of administrative districts and contention between Tidore and Ternate over the location of the soon-to-be capital cast into doubt the viability of numerous existing power-structures and those employed by the groups that formed these structures.

Economic power in Ambon from the mid-1980s onwards was held by civil servants, observed P. M. Laksono, and their salaries and monetary provisions from Jakarta contributed the overwhelming majority of wealth entering the Maluku region, as local agricultural and marine production was largely subsistence and commercial fishing operations were mostly foreign owned. Some estimates placed direct employment in the civil service at a quarter of total employment in Ambon and figures from 1990 stated 38% of Ternate workers were employed by the government. The dependence on a generally static number of public service positions meant that youth unemployment in Ambon was unusually high; in Benteng on Ambon 73.2% of the population was listed as not yet employed in 1994, and it was these disaffected youth that mostly composed the foot-soldiers of the conflict.

The violence cannot, however, be entirely attributed to political or religious institutions; during a communal dispute before the outbreak of widespread violence, among others, at the Ambon villages of Wakal and Hative Besar, their representatives acted to mitigate conflict but were widely ignored in that case.

Overview of the conflict

=== Customary factors ===
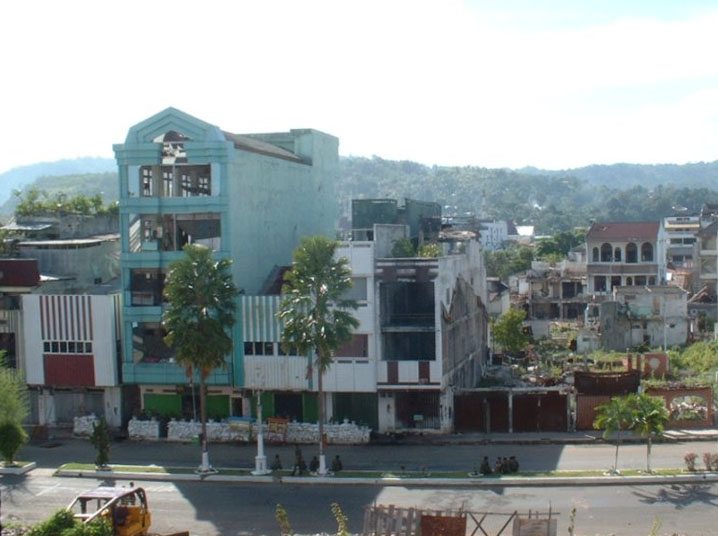
Damage to Ambon City in 2001. Apartments fortified with sandbags can be seen in foreground.

Demographic change has also been cited as a factor in creating tension. Particular issues related to the disturbance of the customary land rights, or adat, that were common to both indigenous Moluccan religious communities but were of little concern to newer migrants who had no interest in a traditional alliance system.

The residents of Ambon had been particularly adherent to a theory of pela gandong, whereby villages, often of differing religious persuasion, were 'bound by blood' to assist one another and marriages between the members of the villages were forbidden, as they were between blood relatives. Any transgression against these rules would be severely punished by curses from the ancestors who founded the institution. The alliances facilitated a relationship to allow peace between villages that were rigidly structured as either wholly Christian or Islamic and had formed the largest political units of Moluccan society prior to the Indonesian state. However, this system could not accommodate land-title of nonlocal, nonvillage-based transmigrant landowners.

These local customs that maintained respect had also been undermined by reform Islam, which was popular in Ternate during the 1980s, and the 1981 fatwa from the Indonesian Ulama Council that banned Christians from participation in Islamic holidays aided the segregation of the religious communities.

=== Ethnic factors ===
Ambon and surrounding islands had a roughly equal number of Christian and Muslim citizens in the years prior to the crisis. However, in the three-decade period after 1969 some 98,000 people were resettled in Maluku as part of the official government transmigration programme, the majority Bugis, Makassarese or other Muslims from South Sulawesi. Further independent migrants also settled in Maluku and in February 1999 the national newspaper, Kompas, estimated 225,000 migrants from South Sulawesi had settled in the Maluku Islands with 30,000 living in Ambon. Bugis and Butonese owners had rapidly increased their share of merchant and retail trade in Ambon to the extent that markets were specifically targeted by Christian gangs during the earlier stages of fighting in Ambon City as a way of harming the Muslim community.

The shift contributed to greater bureaucratic and political representation of Muslims in Maluku district affairs, with two successive Muslim governors selected in 1992 and 1997 who began to fill vacancies in the civil service with Muslim appointees, and has been cited as creating anxiety within the Christian community about a potential Islamisation of Maluku, contributing to sectarian tensions.

During the early stages of the conflict the large-scale internal displacement of Ambonese to Northern Maluku, Ternate in particular, and the rumors and crimes the internally displaced people described to local residents are cited as a factor in the increased sectarian tension and initial violence in North Maluku during August 1999.

=== North Halmahera land disputes ===
In North Maluku the population was 85% Muslim prior to the start of conflict. There had been a steady exodus of Makianese from the island of Makian to Ternate and the northern regions of Halmahera. Dozens of villages had been established and populated by Makianese transmigrants who had moved there from the neighbouring island during the 1970s, following fears of a volcanic eruption. Some of the migrant Makianese had been shifted to live and cultivate on or near land traditionally claimed by the Jailolo and Kao ethno-linguistic groups, and claims to the land became more forceful with the discovery of gold deposits in the 1990s and the announcement of an Australian owned mine to open in mid-1999.

Resentment of the increasing influence of Makianese was not restricted to the Christian minorities, with mistrust aired in Ternate and Tidore following their attainment of important regional positions outside the traditional Makianese homeland.

The dispute over land rights acquired a religious edge as the migrant Makianese were mostly Muslim while the 'indigenous' Jailolo and Kao were predominantly Protestant, however, there had also been a steady transmigration of Muslim Javanese to the Kao lands (even though the indigenous Christian population had been cooperative with the new residents).

In 1999 the Kao and Jailolo claims received backing from the Sultan of Ternate and Protestant ethno-political groups, while the Makianese were supported by Muslim candidates, in their respective attempts to assume governorship of the newly established North Maluku province. During 1999, the national government agreed with Makian lobbyists to create a new Muslim majority Malifut sub-district, or kecamatan, which incorporated 16 Makianese settlements, several villages of Christian Pagu and Kao and the strategic gold deposits on the disputed lands. The Pagu did not wish to be ruled by a Makian majority local government and viewed the ruling as an attempt to damage the traditional unity of the Kao tribes. The first communal violence in Halmahera coincided with 18 August formal inauguration of the Malifut sub-district.

=== Criminal factors ===
The crisis was also allegedly permeated by the rivalry of two large semi-criminal gangs that operated in Ambon and, allegedly, Jakarta. The gangs possessed a quasi-religious identity; the 'Reds' identifying as Christian and 'Whites' as Muslim, and had prepared contingency plans for an attack from the other prior to the start of conflict in 1999.

The Human Rights Watch report concerning Ambon hostilities cites a major communal confrontation of Ambonese migrants in the Ketapang area of Jakarta on 22 November 1998, which saw up to 14 killed and numerous church burnings following rumors that Christian Ambonese guards of a significant gambling house had destroyed a Mosque. Most of the 180 arrested in the immediate aftermath of the violence were of Ambonese origin.

In the several months prior to the start of hostilities a few hundred Ambonese returned from Jakarta and it has been asserted that some were loyal to the leaders of criminal gangs, however, it cannot be independently confirmed whether these were agents provocateurs or workers returning to avoid retaliation.

Soon-to-be president Abdurrahman Wahid indicated that the individual personally responsible for the Ambon unrest was Yorrys Raweyai, the leader of mercenary group Pancasila Youth that had been known to act as hired "muscle" for the Suharto administration activities. While the agent provocateur theory remains popular as an explanation for the start of the crisis, of the 100 or so people arrested for crimes committed during the Ambon unrest, only two have been charged for incitement and neither is believed to be an external agent.

== Timeline of conflict in Southern Maluku ==
=== First Ambon riots ===
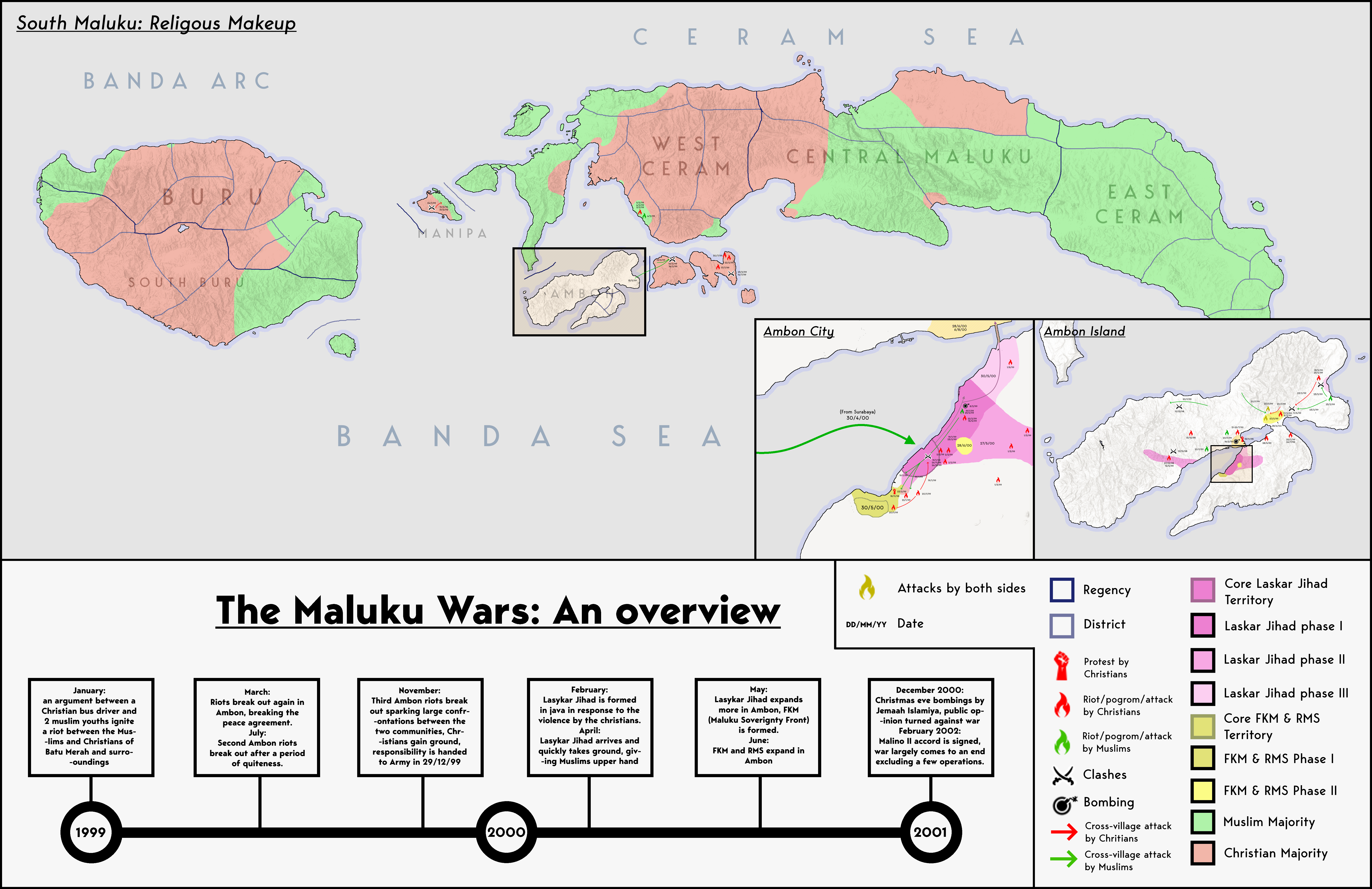
Maluku sectarian conflict

On 14 January 1999, there had been a riot between rival villages in Dobo, of the Aru Islands Regency, that killed up to 12 people, however, the broad scale violence of the Maluku conflict began on Idul Fitri, an Islamic holiday that was on 19 January 1999. Fighting in Ambon City during the first 3 or so days claimed anywhere from 43 to 65 lives, with bodies discovered weeks after in the ruins of Ambon. Over 100 were seriously injured at least 10 houses of worship had been destroyed, with the loss of homes and significant retail services forcing the displacement of up to 20,000 residents. Ambon airport was closed and a curfew applied in the town for the week after. The weapons used in this early period of rioting were mainly machetes, flaming arrows, spears, and other traditional weapons, and arson was as widespread as it would be throughout the conflict.

==== Initial 19 January confrontation ====
It is widely recorded that the initial confrontation that sparked the conflict was between a Bugis minibus driver and either some Christian youths, a drunk or a Muslim conductor, near a bus terminal in Batu Merah village. Despite the differing accounts, it is agreed that a mob, Church reports state some 600 people, of Muslim residents gathered and marched upon the Christian areas of Batu Merah at approximately 16:00 (UTC+9), where they torched numerous houses and several businesses by Mardika market. The group had been driven on by incorrect rumors that the local mosque had been torched and faced little opposition from the police force, which only fielded ten lightly armed intelligence members due to the holiday. More Christian houses were burnt in Silale and Waihaong kampungs later in the afternoon and the first church was torched also. Throughout this initial confrontation it was widely observed that the violence was directed by people from outside the area.

After hearing of the destruction of homes, Christian residents gathered outside Kudamati church to launch a counter-offensive and defend those at Mardika, but were blocked by a Muslim crowd at Waringin in the first direct clash of the two sects with the largest confrontation at Mardika plaza. A truck carrying 50 unidentified youths is alleged to have arrived in Waringin around 17:00 (UTC+9) and the occupants were seen damaging homes and other property with metal bars and rocks, but residents of Waringin claim they fended off the attacks. There had not yet been any casualties and police assured Waringin residents they could return home safely.

At 20:00 (UTC+9) in the evening, around 30 Christians fought back a crowd of Muslims attempting to enter the Silo church, while others were observed gathering to destroy kiosks and pedicabs owned by Muslim Bugis and Butonese. All witnesses describe that by this time violent parties were identifying themselves with either red scarfs or headbands, to signify Christians, or white cloths on their wrists to signify Muslims as they had been instructed by the head of an information post at the al-Fatah mosque.

==== Commencement of civil disobedience in Ambon ====
On the night of 19 January, witnesses report that large, and allegedly well organised, groups of Christian rioters entered Kampung Paradeys in several waves, smashing and looting from Muslim homes on the orders of an unknown leader. The targets of the attackers were Buton, Bugis and Javanese migrants, however, the mob was indiscriminate in the burning of Muslim houses in the neighbourhood.

In Waringin, Christian rioters are alleged to have attacked the property of Muslim locals multiple times during the night, injuring 6, and some Christians identified as from the Nusaniwe subdistrict attacked again with Molotov cocktails around 10:00 (UTC+9) on 20 January, igniting fires that are claimed to have caused the destruction by arson of 120 houses. This destruction heralded the first large-scale displacement of people, as 240 households took refuge in other Muslim kampung, contributing to the estimated 3,000 that fled in the initial 3 days of fighting.

During the early morning of 20 January, Christian mobs burned the overwhelmingly Bugis-owned stalls of the Pelita, Gambus and Mardika markets while a large settlement of Butonese people around the Gambus market was also looted and destroyed. An Islamic elementary school and kindergarten were also burned, and there was selective burning of Muslim-owned property, such as Padang restaurants, along Ambon's main streets. At least one Butonese school-girl was among several reported killed during the rioting at Gunung Nona, struck by a machete and placed in a sack, and other bodies were found during the following days in the ashes of destroyed buildings, trapped by the rapidly moving flames.

==== 20 January attack on Benteng Karang and other villages ====
Muslim residents of Hitu, Wakal and Mamala were told a rumor early on 20 January that the al-Fatah mosque in Ambon had been desecrated and demolished, and many worshipers massacred; hearsay for which a candidate for village head in Hitu was later arrested on charges of incitement. The irate Muslims of Hitu were to march to Ambon in protest, passing several Christian villages in the hinterland region. In assaults that claimed around 20 lives many villages were partially or wholly destroyed by the 3,000 strong mob.

One of the first villages the mob had to pass through on the Ambon road was Benteng Karang, an all-Christian village where they launched their attack. Police warned the residents of Benteng Karang on two occasions they were likely to be attacked, and a group had gathered around the main church shortly before the arrival of the marchers. The marchers allegedly bombed the Catholic Church with a fishing bomb and set fire to three other churches, before attacking the sheltering families of the 40 who sought to defend the village. The village was entirely destroyed and 16 died in the massacre, all from Benteng Karang, including one pregnant mother and child.

The large movement of Hitu Muslims continued to advance upon Ambon through the mixed-faith hillside villages of Hunuth, Waiheru, Nania and Negeri Lama who were warned of the advance by survivors of Benteng Karang. Women and children of Hunuth took refuge on boats while the men attempted to defend their property, but soon fled after the death of one defender. A teenage boy and a military veteran were killed and least 40 Christian owned houses, two churches and a health service post were burned in the other villages.

The movement was confronted by residents at Passo, who had mobilized after hearing of the destruction of Benteng Karang. At the point of contact a group of 10 soldiers attempted to restrain each side from advancing, however the units were forced to withdraw after coming under attack with missiles. The number of armed Passo residents steadily grew to over 100 as the defenders repelled several advances and, eventually, an agreement was negotiated whereby the Hitu Muslims were to return to Hitu in army trucks. Most, however, returned on foot and are known to have murdered a local Protestant minister in the village of Nania also.

==== 20 January attack on Hila Bible camp ====
Some 120 people, which some sources describe as mostly children and teens, had been taking part in a 3-day Bible camp on the grounds of a University of Pattimura research station near Hila, when six were killed in an apparent attack by people from the nearby Muslim village of Wakal.

Two men from the group were murdered, and their van torched, while travelling through Wakal town after seeking assistance from the military in Hila village to transport the campers. Soon after, a truckload of militants arrived at the camp ground and ordered the campers out of the rooms where they had taken shelter, 4 of those who emerged were murdered with machetes, 3 adults and an adolescent boy according to some sources. The boy is often referred to as Roy Pontoh, a 15-year-old Ambonese Christian who is described as having stood up to the militants when asked to renounce his faith and was subsequently murdered with a machete and his body placed in a ditch. Other campers were abused, ordered into the main hall and robbed of their valuables.

Despite the efforts by residents of both faiths to prevent an assault, the following day Hila village proper was allegedly attacked by a Wakal mob, who murdered one person and looted and torched numerous, mostly Christian, houses. The Dutch-built 18th century Immanuel Church in Hila was also destroyed by arson.

==== 23 January murder of a Kostrad soldier in Benteng ====
In the first recorded confrontation of security forces and the rioting public several, reportedly Christian, rioters were shot and at least one killed following the stabbing murder of a Balinese member of the Kostrad Strategic Reserve Command in the coastal neighbourhoods of Benteng, though the order of events is disputed. Eleven youths, all Christian, were later charged with murder.

Allegedly the soldiers had been intervening in a confrontation of Bugis and Ambonese Christian youths, however people on the Christian side felt the authorities were being overly forceful with the Christian fighters and lashed out at the Kostrad troops, killing Gusti Ngurah Hartawan. In defence, the soldiers opened fire on the crowd, killing one or possibly two. Media reports describe a gathering of 200 people marching on the Police headquarters in Ambon in protest.

The same day, after the carnage in Ambon, security forces were given orders to shoot on sight any potential troublemakers, though their use of these powers in several instances called into question whether the new police powers were being abused, or if officers were acting impartially in the conflict.

Accusations of police collusion with Muslim fighters were common, and five Muslim residents hiding in a military transport vehicle the day before had been killed after they were allegedly found to be concealing weapons. Media publication, Tempo, suggested the murders were motivated by revenge for the death of a Protestant minister in Nania.

At least 13 were also killed at the Christian village of Waai, Ambon Island, on 23 January after an attack by Muslim residents from Tulehu in a raid that mirrored traditional Ambonese inter-communal fighting. The Muslims are alleged to have declared jihad against the rival Christian village after the displacement of Muslim Butonese to Tulehu, and raided the Waai township with fishing bombs among other weapons. Waai authorities counted the deaths of 2 locals and a visitor and killed a further 10 Muslim aggressors in the defense of the town, a number supported by Muslim sources, who claim more Christians were killed. Significant tourist infrastructure was also destroyed.

==== Respite and resumption of fighting in Ambon ====
After the initial rioting there were several weeks or so of respite from wide scale violence, attributed in part to the deployment of 3,000 more troops, most of whom were from outside Maluku province. Road blocks had been established by their respective factions around villages in Ambon, preventing several possible clashes but also causing transport limitations and food shortages. Large numbers of displaced people had taken refuge at military installations and there were even reports of Muslims praying at an Ambon mosque guarded by Christians.

Fighting again resumed in Ambon City on the morning of 23 February following a minor confrontation, the nature of which is disputed. It is generally agreed that a Muslim mob formed after the confrontation and was countered by the rapid formation of a rival Christian mob, with each causing damage to property and houses owned by those of the opposing faith. In these early stages of fighting one person is reported to have been killed by security forces and several bombs detonated.

The fighting became more virulent with the reported murder of 5 Butonese passengers of a van near the state Islamic institute by a Christian mob, and a further 8 people were killed in Karang Panjang and Kramat Jaya as homes and a mosque were set alight. Some sources reported up to 23 killed during the day of fighting, mostly Butonese migrants, and several deaths were caused by the actions of security forces.

==== March confrontations ====
On 1 March mobs from the rival faiths confronted each other again and a mob of Ahuru Christians attacked the mostly Bugis and Butonese Rinjani neighborhood, killing a family of 5. The clashes had restarted as people reacted to incorrect reports that 4 others had been shot inside a mosque by police; 3 Muslims had in fact been killed by security forces in surrounding neighborhoods and brought to the mosque, draped in white sheets.

Two more incidents of security force intervention with live ammunition occurred on 6 and 10 February respectively. In the first instance police opened fire on a crowd of Christian youths manning a checkpoint by Silo church, killing one. The plain-clothes police officers had refused to show identification when their vehicles were stopped, and shot at the crowd around the barricade when attacked with home-made weapons. The second intervention happened during another round of clashes by youths armed with petrol bombs and machetes around Batu Merah and Mardika. Ten were killed and 30 seriously injured, and almost all the casualties were caused by the police firing into the unruly crowds.

=== Start of violence on surrounding islands ===
Violence had been restrained on surrounding islands despite the fiery deaths of two in Sanana Island riots on the same day as the Ambon rioting. A clash did take place on Ceram after a misunderstanding during a peace initiative by Christians, which saw at least 7 injured and several Muslim houses and market stalls destroyed on 3 February. The next day several dozen houses were burnt in a Christian village in Kairatu, while on 5 February, Christian residents of Kamariang attacked another Muslim village, prompting the police to open fire and kill one youth.

==== 14 February Haruku Island shootings ====
The largest loss of life at the hands of security forces at that stage in the conflict occurred in Kariu on the island of Haruku, when military units used live ammunition to quell a clash between a groups of Christian residents and Muslims from surrounding villages, reportedly killing 23. Accounts differ as to how many died on either side and the total number of dead from the shooting and confrontation may have been around 30, including 4 elderly residents who attempted to flee to the forest to escape the complete destruction of Kariu and the town's main church by the Muslim mob.

The failure of the military to prevent the destruction of Kariu and the arrest of four Christian police officers falsely accused of firing into the crowd of Muslim aggressors, furthered the belief that the military were biased towards the Muslim militias. The island was subsequently blockaded by the Navy to prevent movement of possible provocateurs.

==== 23 February Saparua Island clashes ====
Two large clashes during the night claimed the lives of around 10 fighters, with several deaths attributed to the actions of security forces. In the first case Christian youths were alleged to have provoked Muslim residents of Sirisori to retaliate, claiming 9 lives. The second clash was between two Saparua villages of rival faith and it is disputed as to whether 3 were killed by security forces or the traditional weapons of the civilian fighters, though it was recorded by Republika newspaper that a few automatic weapons were recovered from fighters and one mosque destroyed. Another confrontation over the damaging of clove plants happened in Sirisori in July that year, also, killing 6.

==== April Kei Island clashes ====
Another altercation between youths concerning an 'insult to Islam' on 27 March is alleged to have started wide scale violence on the Kei Islands, south east of Ambon, that claimed up to 80 lives during the first weeks of April, with particularly fierce fighting happening in the capital Tual. In this case groups of Catholics faced Muslim Ambonese, but the use of red and white to signify allegiance and wholesale destruction by fire of 30 or so mainly Muslim villages mirrored the riots in Ambon.

Fierce reprisal attacks were perpetrated by Muslim mobs against the Protestant town of Elaar Lamagorang on 3 April, claiming at least 36 lives in Kei Kecil. Soldiers recovered 20 bodies from burnt out buildings in Kei Besar and Christian sources reported several instances of alleged kidnapping, the massacre of a priest and children and the deaths of 37 Christians; the Muslim death toll was expected to be much higher with at least 24 killed in the Muslim coastal suburbs of Tual and significant attacks against Muslim villages in Kei Kecil. Approximately 200 Kei Island residents are estimated to have died in three months of fighting and the damage and destruction of at least 4,000 houses and businesses displaced about 30,000 civilians.

The undermanned security forces of the Keis faced logistical difficulties caring for the estimated 13,000 residents that sought refuge at military offices, and another 200 soldiers were deployed from Ambon. The tripling of troop numbers is cited as helping bring the conflict on the Kei Islands to an early end, alongside the actions of elders to promote local adat custom. The violence on the Kei islands was later attributed, in part, to youths and others disregarding the adat teachings of local elders.

=== Second Ambon riots ===
On 16 May a gathering of locals from both faiths to celebrate the Moluccan hero, Pattimura, had quickly progressed into a dispute over who was to carry a ceremonial torch, an honor normally reserved for residents from a majority Muslim village that had been offered to Christian villagers as a sign of good-will. A clash between the groups soon followed, and the security forces opened fire on the crowds when they began damaging property again. At least 7 were killed.

The torch ceremony was also being used that year to inaugurate a new security force, the Pattimura military command, which would oversee the Maluku province; the event only served to humiliate the military, who were attacked with missiles by both sides after the intervention with live ammunition. The dispute happened days after a peace deal was agreed upon by local leaders of the two faiths, and it was therefore clear that the resentment and violence could not be contained by the formalities of an authority distrusted on both sides after the role of security forces in so many deaths.

==== July and August chaos ====
After a clash of drunken youths in the middle-class Poka suburb of Ambon on 23 July and subsequent heavy handed military intervention, fighting intensified to a war-like scale and lead to the deaths of at least a further 34 in the first four days alone, with Ambon hospitals reporting a shortage of blood for transfusion. The mostly Chinese-owned business district, which had largely been spared up until that point, was targeted and destroyed by arson and the largest shopping complex in Ambon left entirely gutted. In addition, many hundreds of homes and thousands of vehicles were destroyed by arson. On 27 July, three members of a rioting Muslim crowd were killed by police directly outside the Al-Fatah mosque, however few instances of intervention with live fire by security forces were recorded with concrete details. Most agree troops fired directly into the warring crowds, and the Catholic diocese of Ambon officially announced a lack of confidence in the military forces, who it said were supporting the Muslim gangs.

The first large-scale massacre of civilians in a house of worship, as would become common in the conflict, was perpetrated by uniformed gunmen on 12 August against local residents taking refuge in a Galala church. The residents were allegedly locked in the Yabok church and fired on by people wearing uniforms of an elite special forces unit, killing around 25 unarmed civilians, including a priest and children, and the bodies were later burned by a Muslim mob.

Fighting in Galala had been particularly fierce, claiming another 14 lives in addition to those massacred, however the majority of fighting had been in Ambon City around the Al-Fatah mosque and nearby Maranatha Church, where the city had split into Christian and Muslim enclaves. At least a further 98 had died during early and mid August, including all civilians murdered in Galala and 15 killed in Batu Merah on 10 August, however the deployment of one Marine and two Army battalions to Maluku allowed for some calm to return by 16 August.

Small war-like battles between well organised gangs of the rival faiths took place on a daily basis during late August and September, claiming more lives, including one soldier and at least 8 gang members who had been attacking a church on 10 September. In the period between the first riots in Ambon and September 1999, humanitarian organisation Kontras estimated 1,349 had died in communal fighting and that tens of thousands had been displaced to ad hoc refugee centres or other provinces.

=== Third Ambon riots ===
During the final quarter of 1999 there had been several large confrontations in the suburbs of Ambon City, the largest claiming 38 lives on 26 November, again around the districts of Mardika. Most of the casualties were the result of bullet wounds caused by firearms that only the security forces had access to and, in response, three battalions of military forces were to be withdrawn from Maluku that December and replaced with others that were believed to be not as potentially biased. On 7 December, the governor of Maluku announced aloud the Declaration of Refraining from Violence and Ending the Conflict, signed by senior leaders of all faiths, however no Moluccan religious leaders signed or were party to the drafting of the document.

Massive riots again ignited in Ambon City and surrounding districts on 26 December, and lasted many days, following reports that a 14-year-old Muslim pedestrian was struck by a Christian driver. The intense fighting heralded the widespread use of firearms and home-made bombs by civilian gangs, and claimed at least 68 lives and caused the destruction of the symbolic Silo Church in Ambon City on 26 December. Unverified Christian sources state the Silo Church was attacked during a night prayer session by Muslim militants and the security forces were complicit with the attackers; 39 Christians defending the building suffered bullet wounds, mostly from military weapons, and a local fire engine that had arrived to save the structure was fired upon also.

The December confrontations saw the first specific targeting of security forces personnel, claiming the lives of at least 3 members. Sustained sniper fire was recorded originating from buildings nearby the demarcation line separating the two communities in Ambon City and buildings in the commercial district were shelled by Saladin-class armored vehicles of the Indonesian Army to suppress the sniper fire. Further sniper fire targeting ships ferrying displaced people across Ambon Bay to Pattimura Airport was also reported, while other witnesses described security forces both launching mortar attacks and sustained fire with automatic weapons against specific suburbs in Ambon City, mostly by individual troops acting in a partisan manner. Some of the sniper fire has been attributed to Christian Brimob personnel, angered by the destruction of the Silo church, attacking Muslim targets.

Responsibility for security in Maluku province was officially given to the Indonesian military on 29 December 1999, allowing for the army to conduct broader searches and apprehend suspects.

==== Violence on Seram and Buru Islands ====
Up to 42 people were killed on neighbouring Seram Island over three days during a raid by Muslim militias on the predominantly Christian town of Alang Asaudi on 3 December, and government forces were criticized for not preventing such a high number of casualties. On 4 January 2000, at least 17 were killed by live ammunition as police opened fire on clashing mobs in Masohi, a port town on Ceram Island, where several hundred houses were also destroyed by arson. A significant number of units were transferred from Ambon the weeks prior to contain the violence, but were largely ineffective in preventing further attacks on property.

Buru Island saw a period of extreme violence between rival groups around Christmas and Ramadan, claiming at least 43 lives on 23 December alone. A total of 165 are believed to have been killed over several weeks, including 117 Christians, and around 250 houses were destroyed by arson during island-wide fighting started by a scuffle outside a plywood factory. Intervention by security forces during the violence on the island was initially minimal and significant number of Buru residents were reported missing in the weeks after the December violence, most taking refuge in the densely forested interior of the island, and the Indonesian military distributed leaflets urging them to return to their villages. Incidents of forced conversion and atrocities such as forced circumcision and the murder of entire families who resisted conversion caused the almost complete displacement of the Christian population of Buru by mid-2000, following the destruction of 17 Catholic and an unknown number of Protestant churches.

Following the Malino agreement, bombing attacks with more powerful explosives became more common in Maluku province. Two of the more significant attacks included the detonation of an improvised explosive device at a stadium in Ambon City that claimed the lives of 4 young women on 4 September 2002, and the detonation of a bomb that had been thrown into a crowd gathered outside an Ambon City hotel and karaoke bar, which killed 4 and wounded 58, on 3 April 2002.

== Timeline of conflict in North Maluku ==
=== Initial confrontations ===
North Maluku had been largely peaceful until 18 August 1999, inauguration of the new Malifut sub-district provoked the destruction of two Pagu mixed-faith villages on the same day. Several people were killed as Kao residents of both faiths and Makianese Muslim migrants fought for three days, and the majority of sources state that the violence had started with the invasion of Sosol, one of the two villages destroyed by the Makianese gang. A team of leaders was tasked with securing peace by the regional government, however no modifications were made to the redistricting decision and tension remained.

==== Further attacks in Malifut ====
On 24 October, the Makianese allegedly attacked again deeper into Kao lands, though this is disputed by some Makianese, and in counter-attack a 5,000-strong movement of Kao burnt down all 16 of the Makianese villages in the contested Malifut subdistrict. The mixed-faith Kao stressed the non-religious nature of the two battles and took liberties to avoid desecrating any mosques or schools; only 3 people were killed in the fighting, however there was massive destruction to Makianese property and anywhere up to 16,000 Makianese, almost all of those in the subdistrict, fled to Ternate and other areas.

==== November riots in Tidore and Ternate ====
A large number of displaced Makianese had also fled to Tidore, an island with a significant Muslim majority. In the following weeks a fake letter detailing plans for the forced removal of Makianese from Halmahera with alleged input from the local Protestant institutions was distributed in the Muslim communities of Ternate and Tidore, inflaming tensions and pressuring local officials to seek an explanation from Christian leaders. In hindsight the document was an act of blatant provocation likely forged by Makianese bureaucrats, however on 3 November the Reverend Riskotta was viciously murdered by a Muslim mob in Tidore while attending a meeting to discuss concerns with the officials, having been escorted there by police. No other Christian leaders had attended out of fear for their safety, and immediately after the Reverend's murder the gathered crowd turned on local Christian people and property, killing 8 more people, and burning 3 churches and some 260 houses in an island wide riot.

On 6 November, a several-hundred strong Muslim gang, led by local Makianese political elite and thought to be mostly Makianese refugees, raged through Ternate attacking the Christian minority there also. The police forces of Ternate were only able to guard their own institutions from attack, yet the traditional guards of the Sultan of Ternate, mostly composed of local Ternate Muslims, were particularly effective at protecting the local Christian population from attack. The Sultan's guard had both established secure perimeters around areas of the city, including the mostly Chinese-owned business district, and physically stood between the mobs and possible victims in some cases and were later commended for preventing a potential massacre. At least 4 people died, however, and the Indonesian Navy later evacuated the several thousand Christian residents of both islands to Bintung and Manado in North Sulawesi.

==== Tension in central Halmahera ====
In the days following the Ternate riots, Muslim provocateurs are alleged to have directed attacks against Christian civilians in the sub-districts of Payahe and West Gane, both home to significant populations of Makianese. There were Christian casualties in Lola village, including the death of a pastor. Several thousand residents were displaced to Tobelo in northern Halmahera. The targeting of churches for destruction and rumors that a number of children were killed by the Makianese fighters, along with descriptions of the security forces' inability to protect local Christians in Tidore and Ternate, prompted Halmahera residents to construct homemade weapons to defend themselves. Distrust by Christians was mostly directed at Makianese and Ternate migrants in Tobelo, as was aired to a political delegation including the Sultan of Ternate and the interim governor sent to Tobelo on 7 December, however rumors of a "bloody Christmas" or "bloody Ramadan" to purge the opposing faith from Halmahera were spread through both communities and intensified the feeling that further violence was inevitable.

=== Post-Christmas violence in Halmahera ===
- 26 December 1999: A clash between Christian and Muslim groups in Gosoma, Tobelo, triggered a wave of violence in the area. Muslims fled from Tobelo to Soasio, while Christians took refuge in the GMIH church.
- 27 December 1999: Muslim mobs attacked the GMIH church and the Christian village of Pune. Armed men from both sides gathered near the mosques and churches in Soatobaru and Dokulamo. A homemade bazooka blast sparked a riot in Soatobaru in the late afternoon. Violence erupted in Tobelo, the largest town in North Halmahera, between Muslims and Christians. Muslim militias, known as Pasukan Merah (Red Force), attacked Christian villages and suburbs, while Christian militias, led by Sakeus Odara, counterattacked and destroyed Muslim properties. By the next morning, most Muslims in Tobelo retreated to the main mosque, Mesjid Raya, which was surrounded by the military and protected from the Christian attackers.
- 28 December 1999: In Ternate, the capital of North Maluku province, a minor incident involving a car driver and members of the Pasukan Kuning (Yellow Force), a pro-Sultanate Muslim militia, escalated into a violent clash between Muslims and Christians in the central city. The Pasukan Kuning were supported by Makians and Tidores, while the Christians were joined by a new militia called Pasukan Putih (White Force). The Pasukan Putih managed to push the Pasukan Kuning back to the Sultan's palace, where a ceasefire was brokered by the Sultan of Tidore. A Catholic school was burned down during the fighting.
- 29 December 1999: Christian militias continued their offensive in North Halmahera, targeting Muslim villages in Gorua and Papilo. They also launched a coordinated attack on Togoliua, where many Muslims had taken refuge in the Mesjid Al Islah mosque. The mosque was bombed and collapsed, killing many of the civilians inside.
- January 2000: The Sultan of Tidore was removed as governor of North Maluku. The Pasukan Putih militia rebranded itself as Pasukan Jihad (Jihad Force) and recruited thousands of fighters from Ternate and Tidore, under the leadership of Abu Bakar Wahid. They planned to launch a major offensive against the Christian areas in North Halmahera.
- 8 January 2000: The Pasukan Jihad left Tidore for Sidangoli, a coastal town in North Halmahera. They were met by resistance from the Kao people, a Christian ethnic group, who had mobilized in the village of Dum Dum.
- 22 January 2000: The Pasukan Jihad and the Kao clashed in the Tabobo area, west of Malifut. The Pasukan Jihad prevailed.
- February-March 2000: The Pasukan Jihad and the Christians engaged in frequent skirmishes in Galela and Jailolo sub-districts. The Pasukan Jihad received reinforcements from Ternate and Tidore, while the Christians relied on local militias and some military support.
- 5 March 2000: The Pasukan Jihad attacked the villages of Makete and Soatobaru, but was repelled by the Duma militia, a Christian group from Galela.
- 25 May 2000: The Pasukan Jihad attacked Mamua, a Christian village near Tobelo, but was again repelled by the Duma militia.
- 29 May 2000: The Pasukan Jihad launched a final assault on Duma, but failed to capture it.
- June 2000: Pasukan Jihad captured Duma, but failed to regain Toboleo or Malifut. The government declared a state of emergency which ended the fighting.

== Impact of the conflict ==
=== Child soldiers ===
During the conflict several thousand child soldiers fought, unofficially, in the civilian militia of both sides; a significant number of the children that fought were either orphaned or displaced by earlier fighting, and felt an obligation to take up arms willingly to protect or avenge their family and religion. Referred colloquially to as "pasukan agas" after a sandfly, around two to four thousand children aged as young as seven are believed to have taken part in the violence, mostly boys armed with petrol bombs and directed to burn down property of the opposite side or given homemade bombs that were thrown at rival militia members and security forces. Older minors perpetrated armed assaults against rival forces or civilian targets, while both elementary and secondary school children helped construct the homemade weapons that were predominant in the first year of the conflict.

=== Genital mutilation ===
A significant number of Christian Moluccans, both female and male, were subjected to forced conversion entailing circumcision, allegedly by Muslim agitants. The majority of the 3,928 reported forced genital mutilation cases in Maluku occurred in the years 2000 and 2001, with several mass forced circumcisions alleged to have been perpetrated on the islands of Kesui and Teor, and many of the victims suffered complications from the wounds, requiring later emergency treatment. Accounts describe that several militia fighters were also subjected to brutal, non-religious penis removal.

A specific incident of mass mutilation was recorded as taking place in the east Seram village of Tanah Baru, when several hundred Catholic villagers of both sexes were taken as prisoners to a local mosque. The captives, ranging in age from 6 to the elderly and including pregnant women, were crudely circumcised with shared razors and left with open wounds. An investigation following the incident surveyed 405 residents and confirmed the circumcisions were done under duress, and 648 Christians were later evacuated from the island. Witnesses from other villages described to Christian researchers several instances of the village Christian population, aged 6 and upwards, being forcibly circumcised with unclean implements. Ritual female circumcision is not traditionally practised in Maluku or wider Indonesia.

== Bibliography ==
- Bertrand, Jacques (2004). Nationalism and ethnic conflict in Indonesia. Cambridge University Press. ISBN 978-0-521-52441-4.
- Braithwaite, John; Dunn, Leah (2010). "3. Maluku and North Maluku" (PDF). Anomie and Violence: Non-truth and reconciliation in Indonesian peacebuilding. The Australian National University. pp. 147–243. ISBN 978-1-921666-22-3.
- Duncan, Christopher R. (2013). Violence and Vengeance: Religious Conflict and Its Aftermath in Eastern Indonesia. Cornell University Press.
- Goss, Jon (2000). "Understanding the Maluku Wars: Overview of Sources of Communal Conflict and Prospects for Peace" (PDF). Cakalele. 11: 7–39. ISSN 1053-2285.
- Hedman, Eva-Lotta E. (2008). Conflict, violence, and displacement in indonesia. Cornell South East Asia Program Publications. pp. 29–231. ISBN 978-0-87727-775-0.
- Lindsey, Timothy (2008). "Adat law, conflict and reconciliation: the Kei Islands, Southeast Maluku". Indonesia, law and society. Federation Press. pp. 115–146. ISBN 9781862876927.
- Sidel, John Thayer (2007). Riots, pogroms, jihad: religious violence in Indonesia. NUS Press. ISBN 978-9971-69-357-2.
- van Klinken, Geert Arend (2007). Communal violence and democratization in Indonesia: small town wars. Taylor & Francis. pp. 88–124. ISBN 978-0-203-96511-5.
- Wilson, Chris (2008). Ethno-religious violence in Indonesia: from soil to God. Routledge. ISBN 978-0-203-92898-1.
