= Wie =

Wie or WIE may refer to:

- Y, the twenty-fifth letter of the Latin alphabet, pronounced wie

== People ==
- Michelle Wie West (born 1989), American professional golfer
- Ole Petter Wie (born 1966), Norwegian businessman
- Virginia Van Wie (1909–1997), American amateur golfer

== Other uses ==
- Windows Internet Explorer, a web browser
- Wiesenhof–Felt, a cycling team
- Wik-Epa language, a Paman language spoken in Australia

== See also ==
- Y (disambiguation)
- Wi (disambiguation)
- We (disambiguation)
- Wee (disambiguation)
- Wye (disambiguation)
- Why (disambiguation)
- WY (disambiguation)
