= Weixiu =

Weixiu or Wei Xiu may refer to:

- One of three Chinese constellations:
  - Wěixiù (尾宿), meaning Tail
  - Wēixiù (危宿), meaning Rooftop
  - Wèixiù (胃宿), meaning Stomach
- Weixiu, a modern name of the star 35 Arietis
- Joanne Peh (Chinese name Bai Weixiu), Singaporean actress

== See also ==
- Wei (disambiguation)
