= Wee Wee =

Wee Wee may refer to:

- Wee-wee, euphemism for urination
- Wee Wee Hill, hill in Indiana
- "Wee Wee Hours", Chuck Berry song
- In the Wee Wee Hours..., 1987 documentary film
