= Wee =

Wee or WEE may refer to:

- Wee, a slang term for urine (see also wee-wee)
- Wee, short stature, or otherwise small
- A Scottish slang term for “small”

== People ==
- Wee (surname), Chinese surname and name
- Wee Willie Harris, singer
- Wee Willie Webber, Philadelphia radio and television personality

== Other ==
- WEE virus, the western equine encephalitis virus
- Weeley railway station, which has the code WEE

== See also ==
- We (disambiguation)
- Wee Wee (disambiguation)
- Wee Wee Hill
- Wei (disambiguation)
- Wii, a Nintendo video game console
- WEEE, the Waste Electrical and Electronic Equipment Directive
