= Sapalewa River =

River in Indonesia

Coordinates: 2°55′48″S 129°17′12″E

Sapalewa River Sungai Sapalewa, Wae Sapalewa, Wai Sapolewa, Sungai Sapolewa, Sapalewabatai, Batang Air Sapalewa
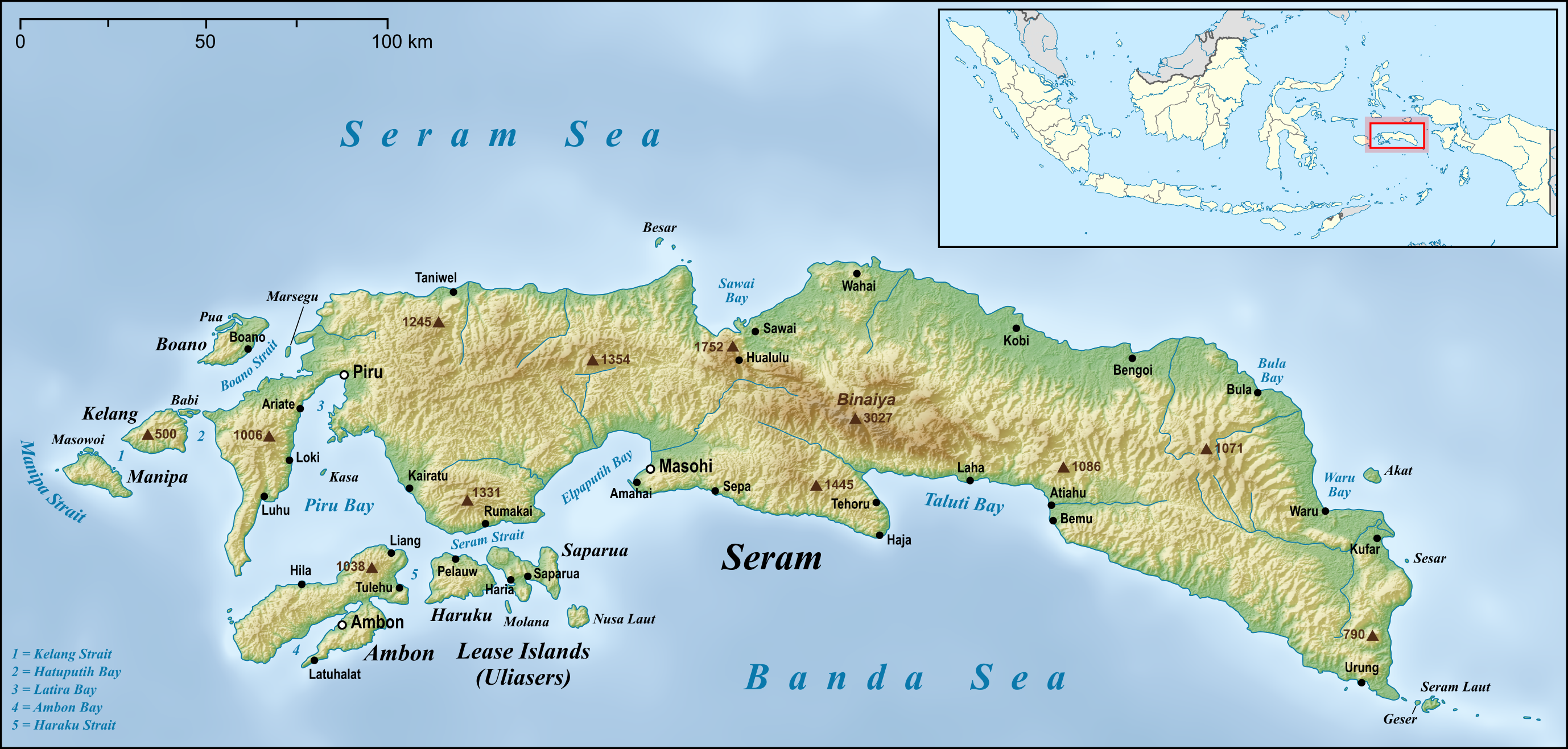
- Location of river mouth Sapalewa River (Maluku) Sapalewa River (Indonesia)

Location
- Country: Indonesia
- Province: Maluku

Physical characteristics
- Source
  - location: Seram Island

Sapalewa River, also Sapolewa, is a river of Seram Island, Maluku province, Indonesia, about 2400 km northeast of the capital Jakarta.

== History ==
According to the Central Maluku legend, the three rivers: Eti River, Tala River and Sapalewa River, flow from a sacred lake on the mountain peak called "Nunusaku". There grows a ficus tree with three big roots, each stretching in the direction of the abovementioned rivers, and this is the origin of the native people of the island of Seram, the so-called "Alifuru" people, who later inhabited the surrounding islands.

The three rivers are known in local language as Kwele Batai Telu or Kwalai Batai Telu ("three stream branches"; Indonesian: "Tiga Ruas Sungai") watering the island of Seram (Nusa Ina). "Nunusaku" (which was a lost great kingdom according to legends) is a term consisting of two words: "nunu" or "nunue" (ficus tree), and "saku" (truth). This place is located in the area of Manusa-Manue and considered impassable by humans. Alune and Wemale people live in the watershed areas of the three rivers: Alune people inhabit the whole area of Eti river, mountainous area of Tala river and most of the coastal area of Sapalewa river, whereas Wemale people occupy the area east of Tala and Sapalewa rivers.

== Hydrology ==
It flows through Taniwel District, and enters the sea on the northern coast, just north of the village of Opin. One of its tributaries is the Porola (meaning yellow), a stream which flows down from Mount Mai. The river between the villages of Taniwell and Buria, underground through the mountains of Hatu Toi Siwa. The Sapalewa Underground river currently explored for about 3.7 kilometers is one of the largest underground rivers of the planet.

== Geography ==
The river flows in the western area of Seram island with predominantly tropical rainforest climate (designated as Af in the Köppen-Geiger climate classification). The annual average temperature in the area is 23 °C. The warmest month is September, when the average temperature is around 25 °C, and the coldest is January, at 22 °C. The average annual rainfall is 3118 mm. The wettest month is July, with an average of 442 mm rainfall, and the driest is October, with 112 mm rainfall.

== See also ==
- List of drainage basins of Indonesia
- List of rivers of Indonesia
- List of rivers of Maluku (province)
