= The Honeydrips =

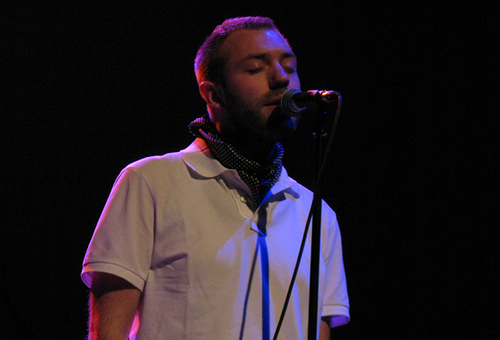
- The Honeydrips at the Henry Fonda Theater

Background information
- Origin: Gothenburg, Sweden
- Genres: indie pop, electropop
- Labels: Sincerely Yours, Luxury, Beko Disques
- Members: Mikael Carlsson

The Honeydrips is Mikael Carlsson’s (former lead singer for Dorotea) electronic pop music solo project.

The electropop band is under the Swedish label Sincerely Yours. Here Comes the Future came out in 2007 and received an 8.4 on Pitchfork Media. Also released are the singles "I Wouldn’t Know What To Do" and "(Lack of) Love Will Tear Us Apart".

The track "Fall From A Height" from Here Comes The Future samples quotes from Annie Hall, when the little Woody Allen talks about the expansion of the universe, and Rebel Without a Cause.

On June 30, 2010, Mikael Carlsson announced the end of The Honeydrips, releasing one final song – "Höstvisa". He continue to make music in the band WÆE all along the years.

The Honeydrips returned in October 2014, releasing the single "Oh Stampe, Oh Stella" on the Swedish label Luxury. In January 2015, Mikael Carlsson announced a new album entitled "In The City".

== Discography ==
=== Albums ===
- Here Comes The Future (2007)
- In The City (2015)

=== Singles ===
- Save Me (2005)
- (Lack of) Love Will Tear Us Apart (2007)
- I Wouldn’t Know What To Do (2007)
- Oh Stampe, Oh Stella (2014)
- It Was Love (2022)
