= Tala River =

River in Indonesia

Coordinates: 3°20′4″S 128°41′28″E

Tala River Sungai Tala, Wae Tala, Talabatai, Batang Air Tala
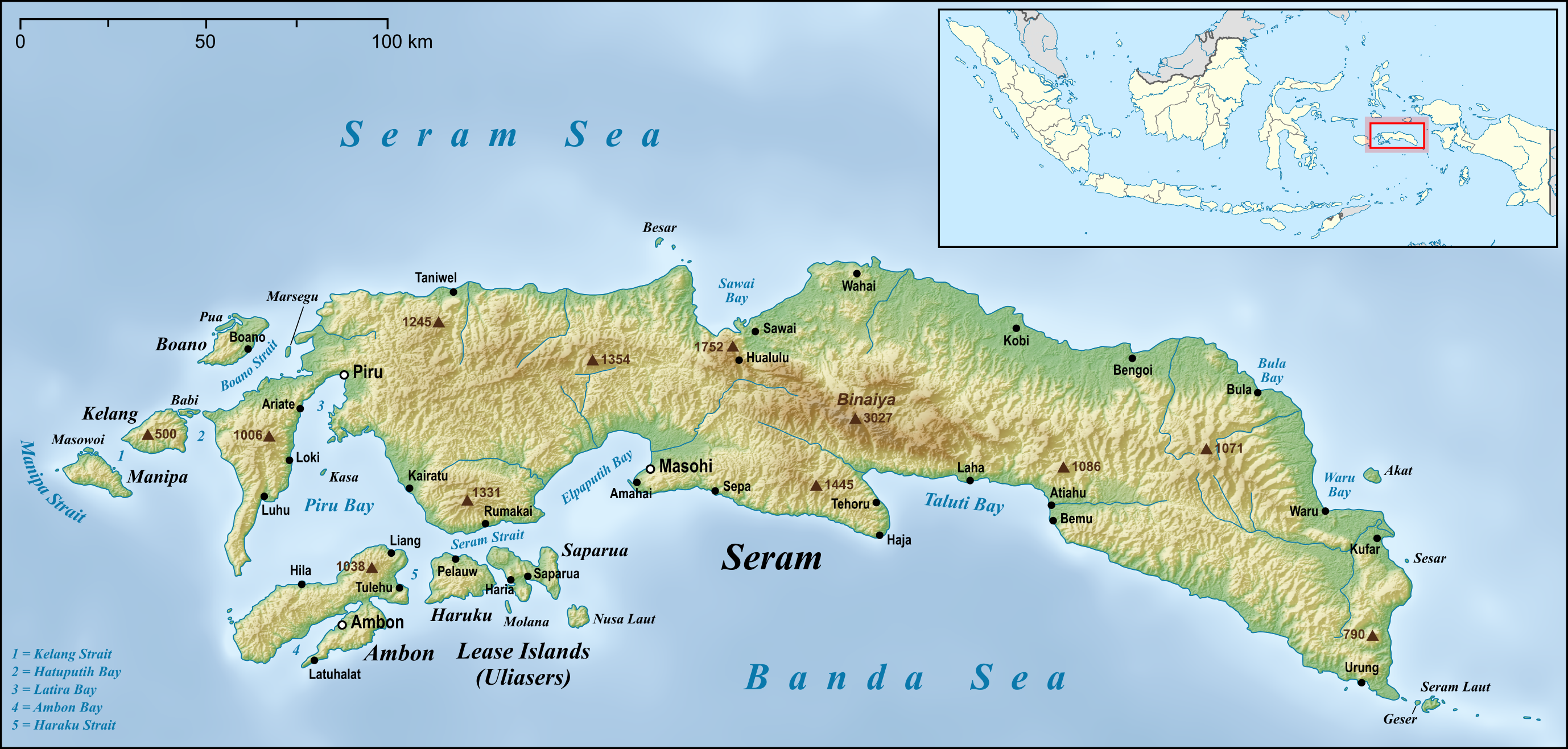
- Location of river mouth Tala River (Maluku) Tala River (Indonesia)

Location
- Country: Indonesia
- Province: Maluku
- Regency: West Seram

Physical characteristics
- Source
  - location: Seram Island

The Tala River is a river of western Seram Island, Maluku province, Indonesia, about 2,400 km northeast of the capital Jakarta.

== History ==
According to the Central Maluku legend, the three rivers (Eti, Tala and Sapalewa) flow from a sacred lake on the mountain peak called Nunusaku. There grows a ficus tree with three big roots, each stretching in the direction of these rivers, and is where the Alifuru people of Seram island, who later inhabited the surrounding islands, originated. The three rivers are known in local language as Kwele Batai Telu or Kwalai Batai Telu ("three stream branches"; Indonesian: "Tiga Ruas Sungai") watering the island of Seram (Nusa Ina). "Nunusaku" (a lost great kingdom according to legend) is a term consisting of two words: "nunu" (ficus tree) and "saku" (truth). This place is located in the area of Manusa-Manue and considered impassable by humans. Alune and Wemale people live in the watershed areas of the three rivers. Alune inhabit the whole area of the Eti, the mountainous area of Tala and most of coastal Sapalewa, while the Wemale live east of the Tala and Sapalewa.

== Hydrology ==
The Tala is one of the three main basins of the western side of Seram. It flows southward, and empties into El-Paputih Bay on the southwest coast of the island.

== Geography ==
The river flows in the western area of Seram island with predominantly tropical rainforest climate (designated as Af in the Köppen-Geiger climate classification). The annual average temperature in the area is 22 °C. The warmest month is March, when the average temperature is around 24 °C, and the coldest is June, at 20 °C. The average annual rainfall is 3349 mm. The wettest month is July, with an average of 442 mm rainfall, and the driest is October, with 112 mm rainfall.

Tala River

Climate chart (precipitation, max. and min. temperature)
J	F	M	A	M	J	J	A	S	O	N	D
187 24 20	189 24 22	207 25 22	258 23 21	383 23 20	383 21 20	627 22 21	358 23 19	213 25 20	107 26 20	147 25 22	290 25 22
- █ Average max. and min. temperatures in °C
- █ Precipitation totals in mm
Imperial conversion
J	F	M	A	M	J	J	A	S	O	N	D
7.4 75 68	7.4 75 72	8.1 77 72	10 73 70	15 73 68	15 70 68	25 72 70	14 73 66	8.4 77 68	4.2 79 68	5.8 77 72	11 77 72
- █ Average max. and min. temperatures in °F
- █ Precipitation totals in inches

== See also ==
- List of drainage basins of Indonesia
- List of rivers of Indonesia
- List of rivers of Maluku (province)
