= Salawai River =

River in Indonesia

Coordinates: 2.9543657°S 129.218016°E

Salawai River Sungai Salawai
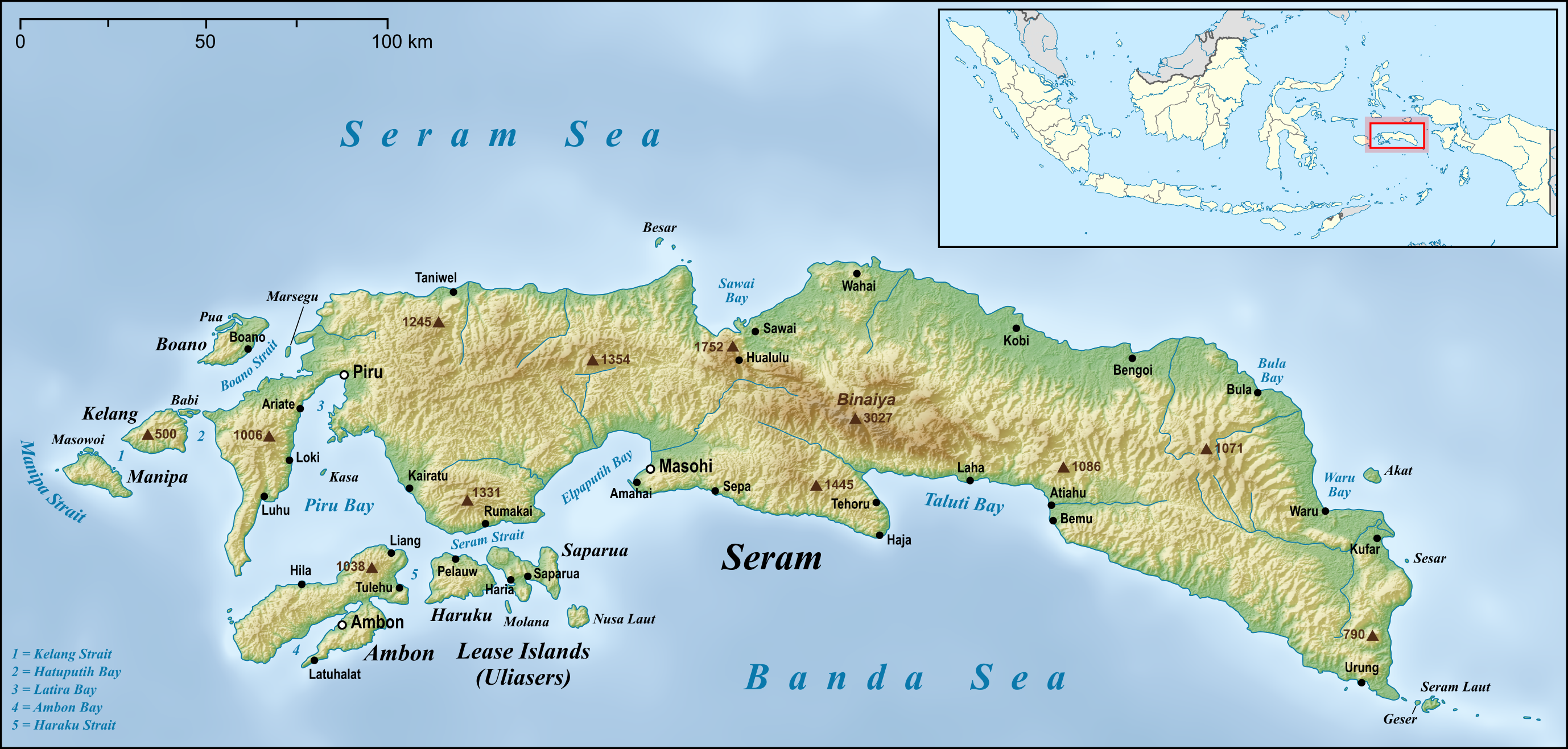
- Location of river mouth Salawai River (Maluku) Salawai River (Indonesia)

Location
- Country: Indonesia
- Province: Maluku

Physical characteristics
- Source: Seram Island
- Mouth: Ceram Sea

Salawai River is a river of Seram Island, Maluku province, Indonesia, about 2500 km northeast of the capital Jakarta.

== Ecology ==
The river is noted for its saltwater crocodiles. Tourists can be taken up the river in longboats.

== Geography ==
The river flows in the central northern area of Seram island with a predominantly tropical rainforest climate (designated as Af in the Köppen-Geiger climate classification). The annual average temperature in the area is 23 °C. The warmest month is April, when the average temperature is around 24 °C, and the coldest is March, at 22 °C. The average annual rainfall is 3387 mm. The wettest month is July, with an average of 523 mm rainfall, and the driest is October, with 95 mm rainfall.

== See also ==
- List of drainage basins of Indonesia
- List of rivers of Indonesia
- List of rivers of Maluku (province)
