= Eti River =

River in Indonesia

Coordinates: 3°6′23″S 128°12′24″E

Eti River Wae Eti, Sungai Eti
- Location of river mouth Eti River (Indonesia)

Location
- Country: Indonesia
- Province: Maluku

Physical characteristics
- Source
  - location: Seram Island
- Mouth: Bay of Piru

The Eti River is a river of Seram Island, Maluku province, Indonesia, about 2400 km northeast of the capital Jakarta. It flows into the sea on the southwest side of the island, a few kilometres south of the town of Piru, West Seram Regency.

== History ==
According to the Central Maluku legend, the three rivers Eti River, Tala River and Sapalewa River, flow from a sacred lake on the mountain peak called "Nunusaku". There grows a ficus tree with three big roots, each stretching in the direction of the abovementioned rivers, and this is the reported origin of the native people in Seram island, the so-called "Alifuru" people, who later inhabited the surrounding islands.

The three rivers are known in the local vernacular as Kwele Batai Telu or Kwalai Batai Telu ("three stream branches"; Indonesian: "Tiga Ruas Sungai") watering the island of Seram (Nusa Ina). "Nunusaku" (which was a lost great kingdom according to legends) is a term consisting of two words: "nunu" or "nunue" (ficus tree), and "saku" (truth). This place is located in the area of Manusa-Manue and considered impassable by humans. Alune and Wemale people live in the watershed areas of the three rivers: Alune people inhabit the whole area of Eti river, mountainous area of Tala river and most of the coastal area of Sapalewa river, whereas Wemale people occupy the area east of Tala and Sapalewa rivers.

== Geography ==
The river flows in the southwest area of Seram island with predominantly tropical rainforest climate (designated as Af in the Köppen-Geiger climate classification). The annual average temperature in the area is 22 °C. The warmest month is April, when the average temperature is around 23 °C, and the coldest is July, at 20 °C. The average annual rainfall is 3233 mm. The wettest month is July, with an average of 596 mm rainfall, and the driest is October, with 124 mm rainfall.

Eti River

Climate chart (precipitation, max. and min. temperature)
J	F	M	A	M	J	J	A	S	O	N	D
184 23 22	202 23 21	238 23 20	236 24 22	327 23 20	363 23 20	596 22 19	363 23 19	195 25 19	124 25 21	145 25 21	261 24 20
- █ Average max. and min. temperatures in °C
- █ Precipitation totals in mm
Imperial conversion
J	F	M	A	M	J	J	A	S	O	N	D
7.2 73 72	8 73 70	9.4 73 68	9.3 75 72	13 73 68	14 73 68	23 72 66	14 73 66	7.7 77 66	4.9 77 70	5.7 77 70	10 75 68
- █ Average max. and min. temperatures in °F
- █ Precipitation totals in inches

== See also ==
- List of drainage basins of Indonesia
- List of rivers of Indonesia
- List of rivers of Maluku (province)
