= Masiwang River =

River in Indonesia

Coordinates: 3°26′35″S 130°46′38″E

Masiwang River Sungai Masiwang, Wae Masiwang, Wae Marsimang
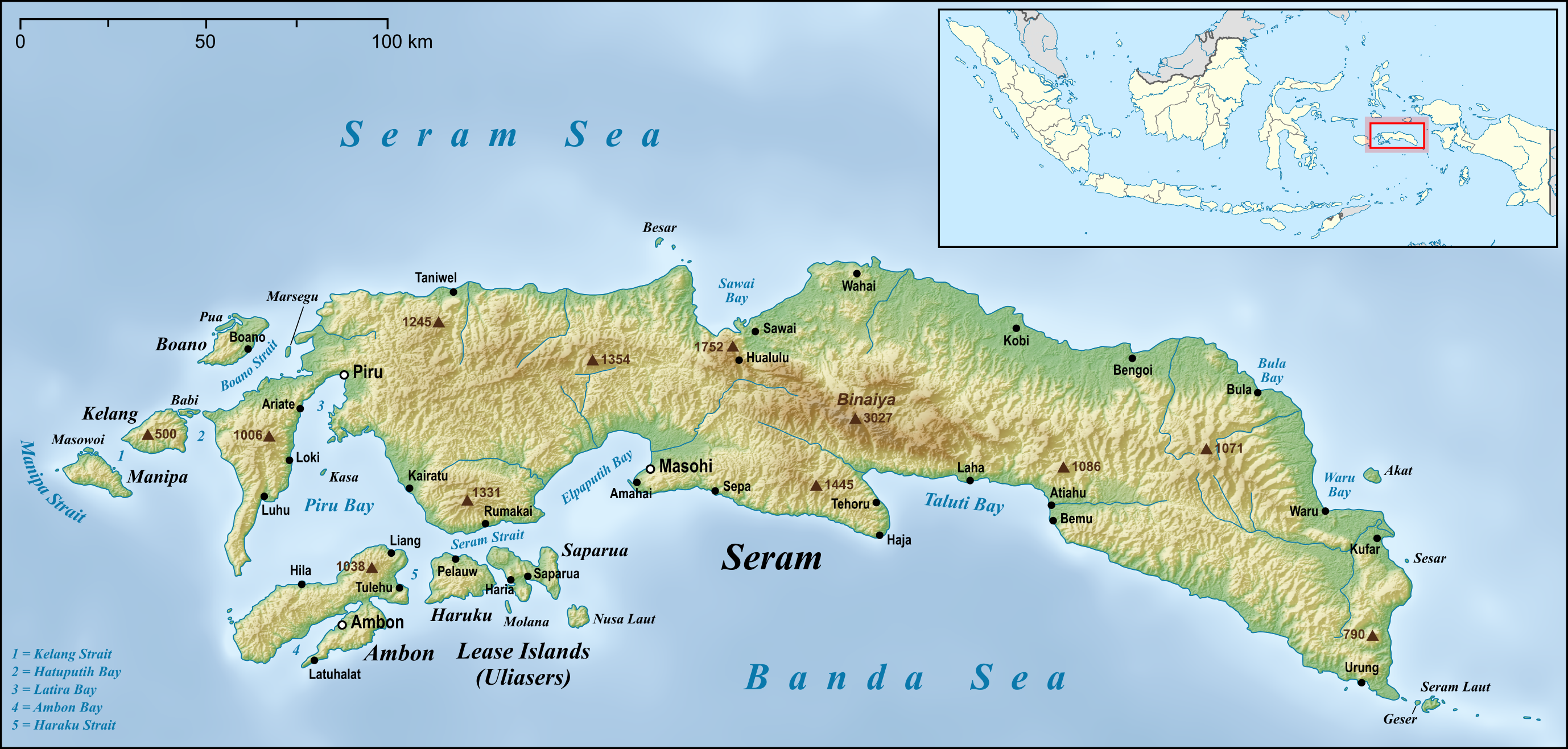
- Location of river mouth Masiwang River (Maluku) Masiwang River (Indonesia)

Location
- Country: Indonesia
- Province: Maluku

Physical characteristics
- Source
  - location: Seram Island
- Mouth: Banda Sea
- Basin size: 1,189.338 km^{2} (459.206 sq mi)

Masiwang River is a river of eastern Seram Island, Maluku province, Indonesia, about 2700 km northeast of the capital Jakarta.

== Hydrology ==
The Masiwang River flows through a wide valley, and is typically shallow, with a significant amount of sediment load. The watershed area of Masiwang is the largest in the eastern part of Seram island with an area of 1189.338 km^{2}. It flows into the sea on the southeast coast of Seram, between Tanjung Tioli, the eastern point of Waru Bay, and Tanjung Masiwang, forming a delta. The Masiwang and Seti languages are spoken in the vicinity.

== Geography ==
The river flows in the eastern area of Seram island with predominantly tropical rainforest climate (designated as Af in the Köppen-Geiger climate classification). The annual average temperature in the area is 23 °C. The warmest month is March, when the average temperature is around 24 °C, and the coldest is July, at 21 °C. The average annual rainfall is 2814 mm. The wettest month is July, with an average of 422 mm rainfall, and the driest is October, with 95 mm rainfall.

== See also ==
- List of drainage basins of Indonesia
- List of rivers of Indonesia
- List of rivers of Maluku (province)
