= Ambon Island =

One of the Maluku Islands in Indonesia

Ambon
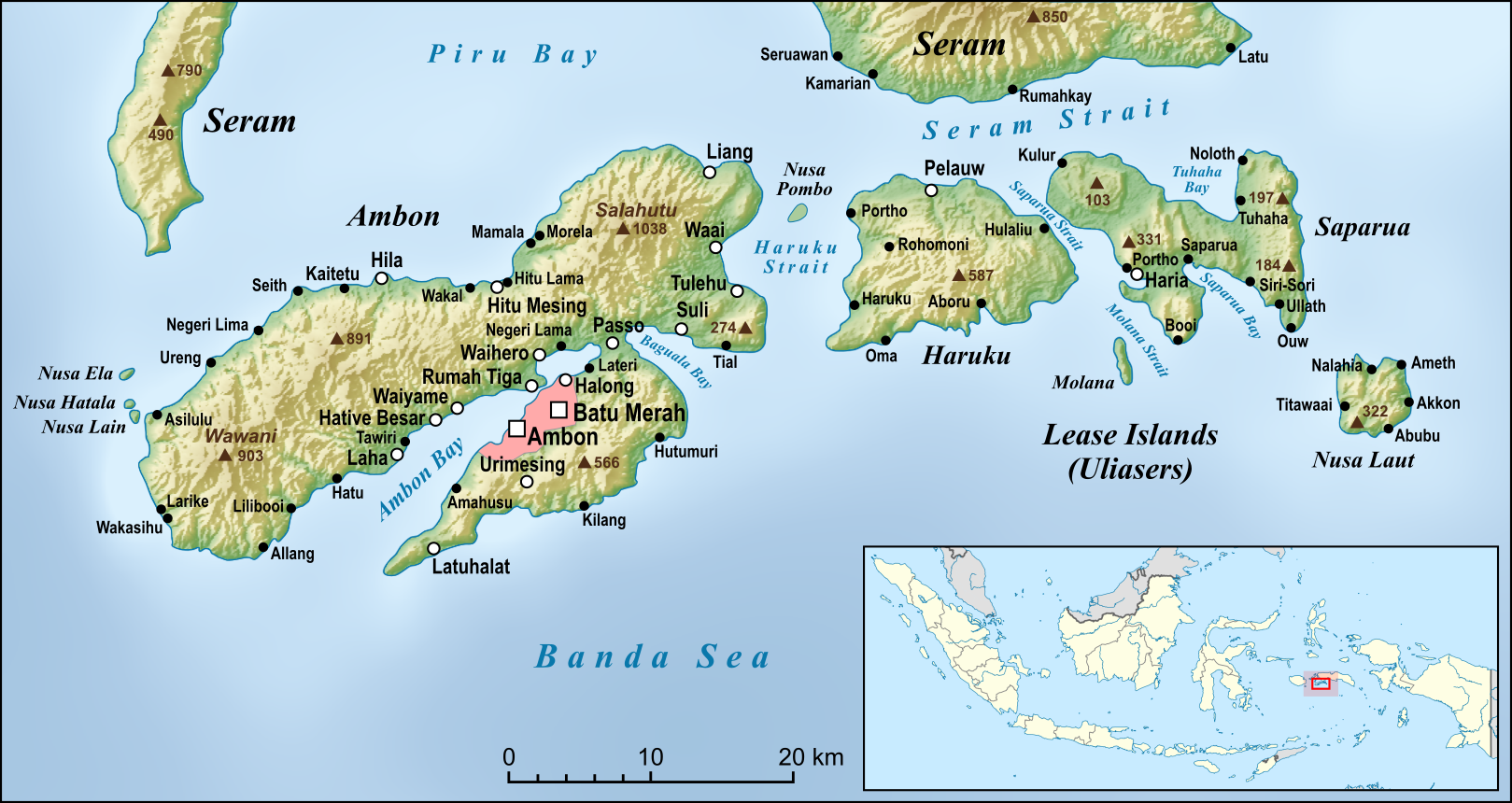
- Ambon (left) and the Lease Islands

- Location within Maluku Location within Indonesia

Geography
- Location: Southeast Asia or Oceania
- Coordinates: 3°38′17″S 128°07′02″E
- Archipelago: Maluku Islands
- Area: 743.37 km^{2} (287.02 sq mi)
- Highest elevation: 1,225 m (4019 ft)
- Highest point: Mount Salahutu

Administration
- Indonesia
- Province: Maluku
- Largest settlement: Ambon

Demographics
- Population: 482,806 (mid 2023 estimate)
- Pop. density: 649.48/km^{2} (1682.15/sq mi)
- Languages: Ambonese
- Ethnic groups: Ambonese

Additional information
- Time zone: IEST (UTC+09:00)

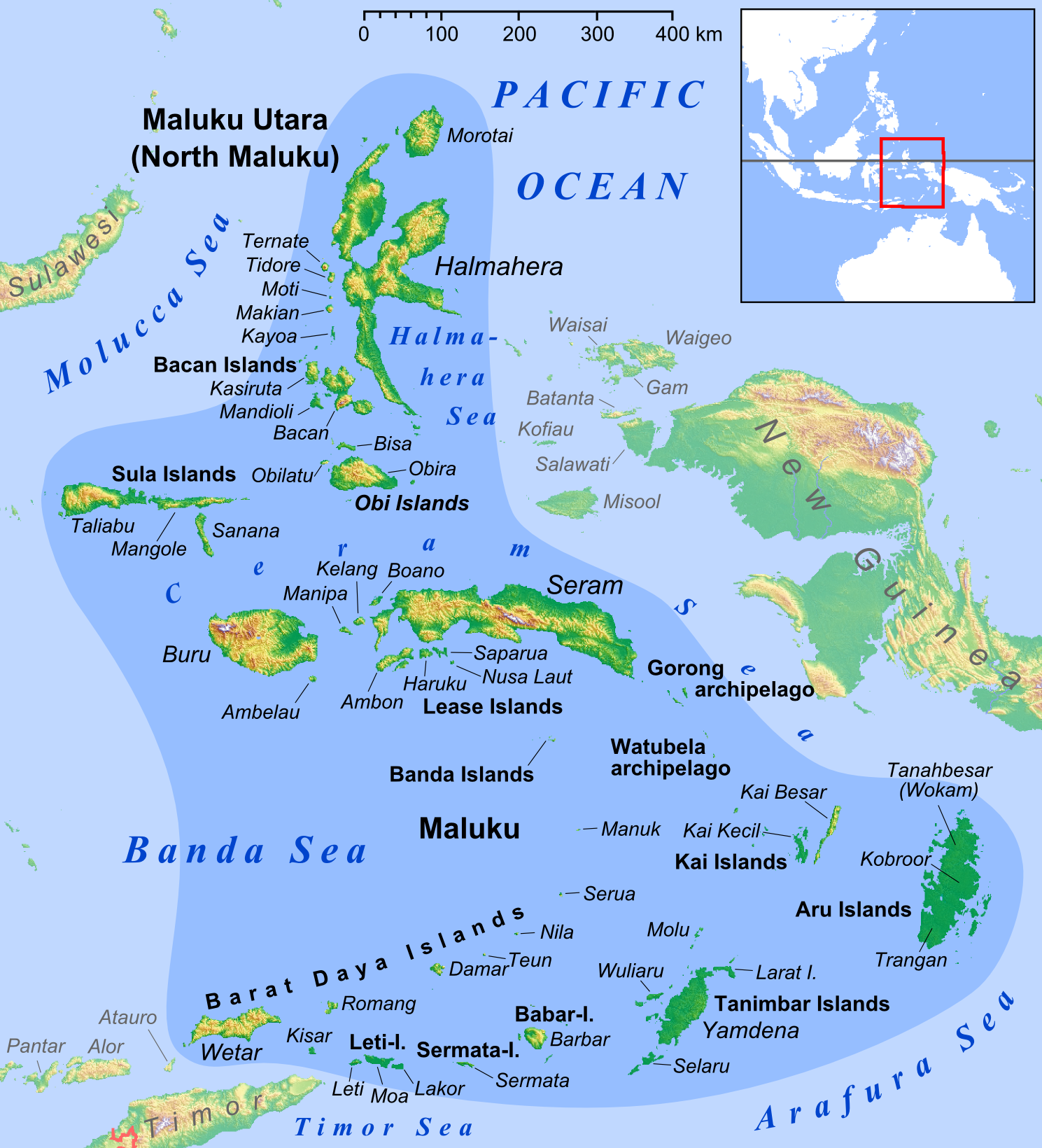
Ambon Island in the center of Maluku Islands

Ambon Island is part of the Maluku Islands of Indonesia. The island has an area of 743.37 km^{2} (287.02 sq mi) and is mountainous, well watered, and fertile. Ambon Island consists of two territories: the city of Ambon to the south, and three districts (kecamatan) of the Central Maluku Regency to the north. The main city and seaport is Ambon (with a 2020 Census population of 347,288), which is also the capital of Maluku province, while those districts of Maluku Tengah Regency situated on Ambon Island had a 2020 Census population of 128,069. By mid 2023 those populations were estimated to have become 354,052 and 128,754 respectively, resulting in an all-island population of 482,806.

Ambon has an airport and is home to the Pattimura University and Open University (Universitas Terbuka), state universities, and a few private universities, which mainly include Darussalam University (Universitas Darussalam, UNDAR) and Universitas Kristen Indonesia Maluku (UKIM).

The precious, highly expensive and sought-after veneer, named as Amboyna, has taken its name from Ambon Island, where much of the figured wood is believed to have been initially exported to Europe, North America and elsewhere.

== Geography ==
Ambon Island lies off the southwest coast of the much larger Seram island. It is on the north side of the Banda Sea, part of a chain of volcanic islands that encircle the sea. It is 51 kilometres (32 miles) long and is of very irregular shape, being almost divided in two by a large inlet (Ambon Bay). The southeastern and smaller portion, (thereby forming a peninsula called Leitimur) is united to the larger northern portion (called Leihitu or Hitoe) by a narrow neck of land. The Ambon Bay thus formed cuts about 20 kilometres (12 mi) into the island with the airport on the northern shore and the city of Ambon on the northern, eastern and southern sides. The city of Ambon covers the entirety of Leitimur, with its centre on the northwest coast of Leitimur, but also includes the south-central part of Leihitu, and has a safe harbor on Amboina Bay.

The highest mountains, Wawani at 1,100 metres (3,600 feet) and Salahutu at 1,225 metres (4,019 feet), have hot springs and solfataras. They are volcanoes, and the mountains of the neighboring Lease Islands are extinct volcanoes. Granite and serpentine rocks predominate, but the shores of Amboina Bay are of chalk and contain stalactite caves.

Wild areas of Ambon Island are covered by tropical rainforest, part of the Seram rain forests ecoregion, together with neighboring Seram. Seram, Ambon, and most of Maluku are part of Wallacea, the group of Indonesian islands that are separated by deep water from both the Asian and Australian continents and have never been linked to the continents by land.

As a result of this isolation, Ambon has few indigenous mammals; birds are more abundant. The insect diversity of the island, however, is rich, particularly in butterflies. Seashells are obtained in great numbers and variety. Tortoise shell is also exported. The coast of Ambon is identified as a site of highest marine biodiversity importance in the Coral Triangle.

The population of the island (administered as Kota Ambon in the south, and Kecamatan Leihitu, Kecamatan Leihitu Barat, and Kecamatan Salahutu in the rural north) was just below 441,000 in the 2010 Census, but by 2020 had risen to over 475,000, and was over 482,800 in mid 2023. This included three tiny and sparsely populated islands (Lain, Hatala and Ela Islands) off the northwest coast,

== Geology ==
Ambon Island is one of many islands influenced by the tectonics driven by the convergence of the Pacific, Indo-Australian, and Eurasian Plates. The northeastern region of the Banda Sea is dominated by the western motion of the Pacific Plate, which has resulted in the formation of a large zone of strike slip faulting. Evidence of slab rollback is also present in the region, expressed in troughs such as the Weber Deep. This motion also is expressed in extensional normal faults across Ambon. Several marine terraces are exposed in the bay regions of the island, supporting theories of uplift in the Banda Sea due to the subduction of the Indo-Australia Plate. These terraces are aged to a period of late Pleistocene to Holocene and are cut by the many faults of the island and are uplifted vertically up to 100 m. Terraces, fault scarps, and recorded seismicity reveal that active faulting continues and indicate that the seismic hazard on the island is high in the future.

== Climate ==
The average temperature is 27 °C (81 °F), rarely falling below 22 °C (72 °F). Rainfall can be heavy, especially after the eastern monsoons, and the island is vulnerable to violent typhoons. The wet season (October to April) coincides with the period of the west monsoon. However, heavy rains and strong winds peak during the months of June through August, contrasting with the typical western Indonesian monsoon patterns and verified locally by the Indonesian Agency for Meteorology, Climatology and Geophysics (BMKG).

== Economy ==
Cassava and sago are the chief crops, which also include breadfruit, sugarcane, coffee, cocoa, pepper and cotton. In addition to these, hunting and fishing supplement the local diet. Nutmeg and cloves were once the dominant export crops but are now produced in limited quantities. Copra is also exported. Amboina wood, obtained from the angsana tree and highly valued for ornamental woodwork, is now mostly grown on Seram. The main employers in Ambon Island are the Gubernatorial Office (PEMDA), the Mayoral Office (PEMKOT), Raiders 733 (Indonesian military unit).

The whole economy of Ambon Island is starting to shift out of the "Old Towne" ("Kota Lama") toward Passo, which is the newly appointed central business district of the island region. The economy of Ambon Island was recently boosted by the investment made by Ciputra Group in creating a whole new satellite city in Lateri, Kotamadya Ambon, Maluku: Citraland Bay View City. The new international standard shopping center, Ambon City Center, opened in 2012.

== Demographics ==
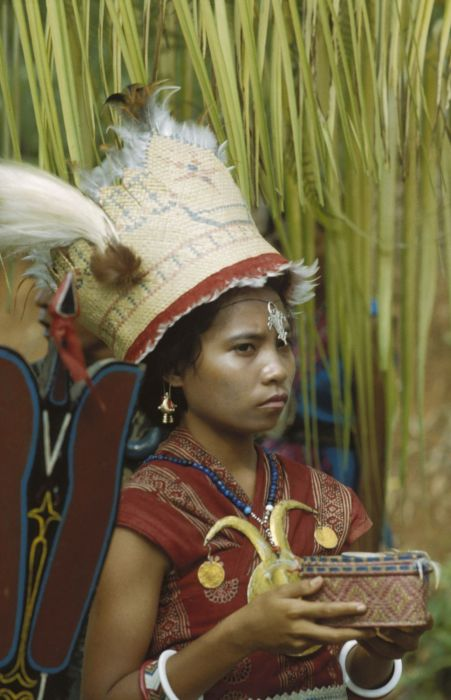
A woman in traditional attire from the Southeastern Maluku Islands

The Ambonese are of mixed Malay-Papuan origin. They are mostly Christians or Muslims. The predominant language of the island is Ambonese Malay, also called Ambonese. It developed as the trade language of central Maluku and is spoken elsewhere in Maluku as a second language. The old creole trade language called Portugis has died out. Bilingualism in Indonesian is high around Ambon City. There have been strong religious tensions on the island between Muslims and Christians and ethnic tensions between indigenous Ambonese and migrants from Sulawesi, primarily Butonese, Bugis and Makassarese migrants.

== History ==
=== Colonial era ===
In 1512, the Portuguese were the first Europeans to land in Ambon, and it alongside Timor became a center for Portuguese activities in Maluku following their expulsion from Ternate. The Portuguese, however, were regularly attacked by native Muslims on the island's northern coast, in particular Hitu, which had trading and religious links with major port cities on Java's north coast. They established a factory in 1521 but did not obtain peaceable possession of it until 1580. Indeed, the Portuguese never managed to control the local trade in spices and failed in attempts to establish their authority over the Banda Islands, the nearby centre of nutmeg production. The creole trade language Portugis, however, was spoken well into the 19th century, and many families still have Portuguese names and claim Portuguese ancestry, for example Muskita and De Fretes.

Coat of arms of Amboina during Dutch colonial era. The charge in the lower half of the arms represents Fort Victoria.

The Dutch dispossessed the Portuguese in 1605, when Steven van der Hagen took over the fort without a single shot. Ambon was the headquarters of the Dutch East India Company (VOC) from 1610 to 1619 until the founding of Batavia (now Jakarta) by the Dutch. About 1615 the English formed a settlement on the island at Cambello, which they retained until 1623, when the Dutch destroyed it. Frightful tortures inflicted on its unfortunate inhabitants were connected with its destruction. In 1654, after many fruitless negotiations, Oliver Cromwell compelled the United Provinces to give the sum of 300,000 gulden, as compensation to the descendants of those who suffered in the "Ambon Massacre", together with Manhattan. In 1673, the poet John Dryden produced his tragedy Amboyna; or the Cruelties of the Dutch to the English Merchants.

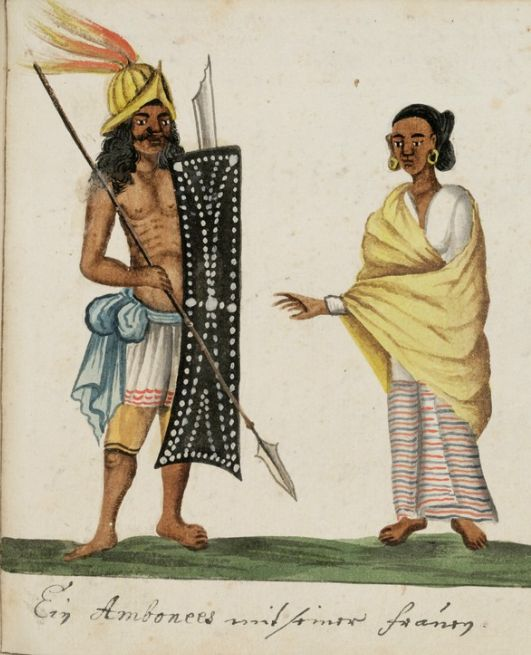
An Ambonese couple, European illustration from the 17th century

Meanwhile, the VOC imposed a monopoly on clove production that was concentrated in Ambon and a few adjacent islands. The Dutch dispositions created great displeasure among local populations. The Muslim state Hitu, in the north of Ambon, was especially recalcitrant, while the southern peninsula Leitimor was largely Christianized and mostly stayed in the European orbit. Moreover, the autonomous governors for the Sultanate of Ternate in Hoamoal in western Seram Island held a generally anti-Dutch stance. All this led to a series of colonial wars during the 17th century. The leader of Hitu, Kakiali, led the resistance from his stronghold Wawani but was murdered by a traitor in 1643, after which Wawani was stormed by the VOC troops and their local allies. A last stand was made by Telukibesi who held out with 300 fighters in the elevated and inaccessible fortification Kapahaha. In July 1646, finally, the VOC troops found a steep track to scale the rock and conquered Kapahaha after a bitter fight. The defeat and death of Telukibesi broke resistance on Ambon Island. However, another conflict involving Hoamoal and several surrounding islands broke out in 1651, known as the Great Ambon War. Although the rebels were assisted by Makassarese auxiliaries, the rebellion was eventually defeated by the VOC commander Arnold Vlaming van Oudshoorn with great loss of life, in 1656. The colonial administration and regulated economy was then conscientiously upheld by the Dutch until European rivals arrived on the scene. Christian Ambonese often served in minor clerical position and as colonial troops in various parts of the Archipelago.

The British, under Admiral Peter Rainier, captured Ambon in 1796, but they restored it to the Dutch at the Peace of Amiens in 1802. They retook the island in 1810 but once more restored it to the Dutch in 1814. Ambon used to be the world center of clove production; until the nineteenth century, the Dutch prohibited the rearing of the clove tree on all the other islands subject to their rule, in order to secure the monopoly to Ambon.

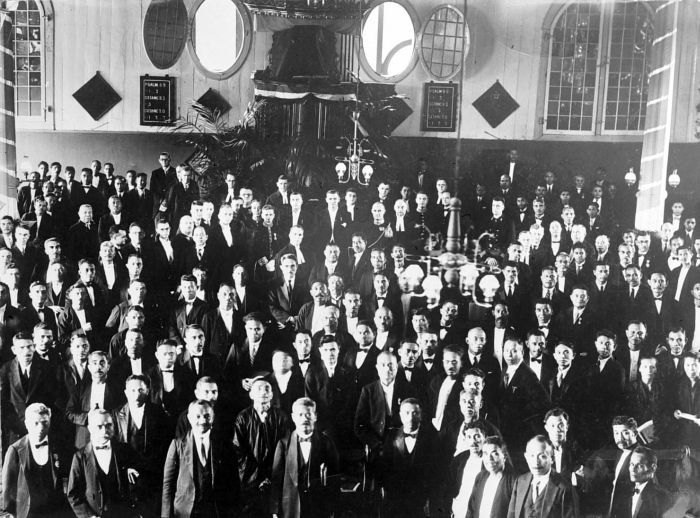
Ambonese burghers congregating at the church in Ambon town.

Under the Dutch Empire, Ambon city was the seat of the Dutch resident and military commander of the Moluccas. The town was protected by Fort Victoria, and a 1902 Encyclopædia characterized it as "a clean little town with wide streets, well planted". The population was divided into two classes: orang burger or citizens and orang negri or villagers, the former being a class of native origin enjoying certain privileges conferred on their ancestors by the old Dutch East India Company. There were also, besides the Dutch, some Arabs, Chinese and a few Portuguese settlers.

Ambon city was the site of a major Dutch military base that Imperial Japanese forces captured from Allied forces in the World War II Battle of Ambon in 1942. The battle was followed by the summary execution of more than 300 Allied prisoners of war in the Laha massacre.

A large Far East prisoner of war camp was situated in the north near Liang. This was made up of British men of the 77th HAA, 3rd Kings Own Hussars and some RAF volunteers. Approximately 1,000 men arrived in April 1943 and were marched from Ambon town over two days without food or water (see 1000 men of Liang to follow).

The FEPOWs built the camp including a water pipeline. They were ordered to build an airfield and runway alongside the beach and cleared coconut trees for the task. They did all they could to sabotage construction.

Conditions were horrendous and many men died due to disease, starvation and ill treatment by the Japanese. Many men also suffered blindness due to working chipping at the coral.

=== Conflicts since independence ===
Indonesia won its independence in 1945–49. As a consequence of ethnic and religious tensions, and President Sukarno making Indonesia a unitary state, Ambon was the scene of a revolt against the Indonesian government, resulting in the rebellion of the Republic of South Maluku in 1950.

In April and May 1958 during the Permesta rebellion in North Sulawesi, the USA supported and supplied the rebels. Pilots from a Taiwan-based CIA front organisation, Civil Air Transport, flying CIA B-26 Invader aircraft, repeatedly bombed and machine-gunned targets on Ambon. From 27 April until 18 May there were CIA air raids on Ambon city. Also, on 8 May 1958 CIA pilot Allen Pope bombed and machine-gunned the Indonesian Air Force base at Liang in the northeast of the island, damaging the runway and destroying a Consolidated PBY Catalina. The Indonesian Air Force had only one serviceable fighter aircraft on Ambon Island, a North American P-51 Mustang at Liang. Pope's last air raid was on 18 May, when an Indonesian pilot at Liang, Captain Ignatius Dewanto, was scrambled to the P-51. Pope had attacked Ambon city before Dewanto could catch him, but Dewanto intercepted him just as Pope was attacking one of a pair of troop ships in an Indonesian fleet west of Ambon Island. The B-26 was brought down by fire from both Dewanto and shipborne anti-aircraft gunners. Pope and his Indonesian radio operator bailed out and were captured, which immediately exposed the level of CIA support for the Permesta rebellion. Embarrassed, the Eisenhower administration quickly ended CIA support for Permesta and withdrew its agents and remaining aircraft from the conflict.

Between 1999 and 2002, Ambon was at the centre of sectarian conflict across the Maluku Islands. In 2007, Ambon resident Leonard Joni Sinay was sentenced to fifteen years' imprisonment for treason after he and other activists protested a visit by President Susilo Bambang Yudhoyono with a dance and a raising of the banned regional flag; both Human Rights Watch and Amnesty International called for his release, the latter organization designating him a prisoner of conscience.

== See also ==
- E. U. Pupella
- Sikula River

== Sources ==
- Conboy, Kenneth; Morrison, James (1999). Feet to the Fire CIA Covert Operations in Indonesia, 1957–1958. Annapolis: Naval Institute Press. ISBN 1-55750-193-9.
- Ricklefs, M.C. (1991). A History of Modern Indonesia Since c.1300 (2nd ed.). London: Macmillan. pp. 25, 28. ISBN 0-333-57689-6.
