= Wei (given name) =

Wei is a Chinese given name. The form 伟 (wěi in pinyin) is the most common Chinese given name, accounting for approximately 0.5% of Chinese people.

== Written forms ==
Wei can be written using different Chinese characters and can mean:

As a masculine name:

- 威, "power"
- 巍, "lofty"
- 伟, "great"
- 卫, "guard"

As a feminine name:

- 薇, "rose"
- 微, "small"

Unisex:

- 唯, "only"
- 未, "future"
- 巍, "lofty"
- 维, "dimension"

== Notable people with name Wei ==
- Wei Wei (韦唯), Chinese singer
- Tang Wei (湯唯), Chinese actress
- Dou Wei (竇唯), Chinese singer and songwriter
- Son Wei (孫暐), Japanese fashion model (of Chinese origin)
- Wei Chen, Canadian television and radio journalist
- Shen Wei (沈瑋), Chinese artist and photographer
- Zhao Wei (趙薇), Chinese film actress and pop singer, sometimes referred to by her English name, Vicki Zhao
- Wei (stage name), Korean rapper from the k-pop group "Up10tion"

=== Fictional characters ===
- Wei, a character from The Lingo Show, a kids' TV show.
- Wei Shen, a Hong Kong-American police detective in Sleeping Dogs, a 2012 action-adventure game made by Square Enix and United Front Games.
- Shen Wei (沈巍), a character from the Chinese BL web novel and show Guardian (web series), written by Priest.
- Feng Wei, a character from the fighting game series Tekken.

== See also ==
- Wei (surname)
