= Way (surname) =

Way is an English surname. Notable people with the surname include:

- Albert Way (1805–1874), English antiquary
- Ann Way (1915–1993), English actress
- Anthony Way (born 1982), English singer
- Ashley Way, director of the 2023 British telemovie Men Up
- Beck Way (born 1999), American baseball player
- Benjamin Way (1740–1808), English politician
- Brian Way (1923–2006), English theatre teacher
- Charles Way (born 1972), American football player
- Damon Way (born 1971), American businessman
- Daniel Way (born 1974), American comic book writer
- Danny Way (born 1974), American skateboarder
- Darren Way (born 1979), English footballer and manager
- Soulja Boy (born DeAndre Way in 1990), American rapper and music producer
- Edward Willis Way (1836–1898), Australian doctor
- Erin Way (born 1987), American actress
- Gerard Way (born 1977), American lead singer
- Gregory Holman Bromley Way (1776–1844), English general
- Isabel Stewart Way (1882–1973), American writer
- James Way (1853–1939), Australian minister
- Kelly-Ann Way (born 1964), Canadian cyclist
- Kirsty Way (born 1998), British trampoline gymnast
- Mikey Way (born 1980), American bassist
- Pete Way (1951–2020), English musician
- Richard Way (1914–1998), British civil servant
- Samuel Way (1836–1916), Australian lawyer and judge
- Tahesha Way (born 1971), American politician and Lieutenant Governor of New Jersey
- Tony Way (born 1978), Actor, comedian and writer
- Tress Way (born 1990), American football punter
