= Oui =

Oui (French: Yes), or OUI, may refer to:

== Books and magazines ==
- Oui (magazine), a men's magazine
- Oui, by René Lévesque, 1980
- Oui, by Marc-Édouard Nabe, 1998
- Oui: The Paranoid-Critical Revolution, by Salvador Dalí and Robert Descharnes, 1971
- Oui, French translation of German novel Ja by Thomas Bernhard, 1978

== Film and radio ==
- Oui (film), a 1996 French film
- Ouï FM, a French radio station

== Music ==
- Oui (album), an album by the band The Sea and Cake, 2000
- "Oui", a song by Charles Aznavour, 2001
- "Oui", by Zazie, 2004
- "Oui" (song), by Jeremih, 2015
- "Oui", by Sivas feat. NODE & Gilli, 2018

== Other ==
- Oui, Burkina Faso, a village in northern Burkina Faso
- Oui, a brand of yogurt by Yoplait
- Operating under the influence, a variant of driving under the influence
- Organic user interface, a user interface with a non-flat display
- Organizationally unique identifier, of computer hardware manufacturers

== See also ==
- Langues d'oïl, dialect continuum that includes French; languages are characterized by the use of oïl (oui in modern French) to mean "yes"
