= Kawa River =

River in Indonesia

Coordinates: 3°13′9″S 129°19′20″E

Kawa River Sungai Kawa, Wae Kawa, Wai Kawa
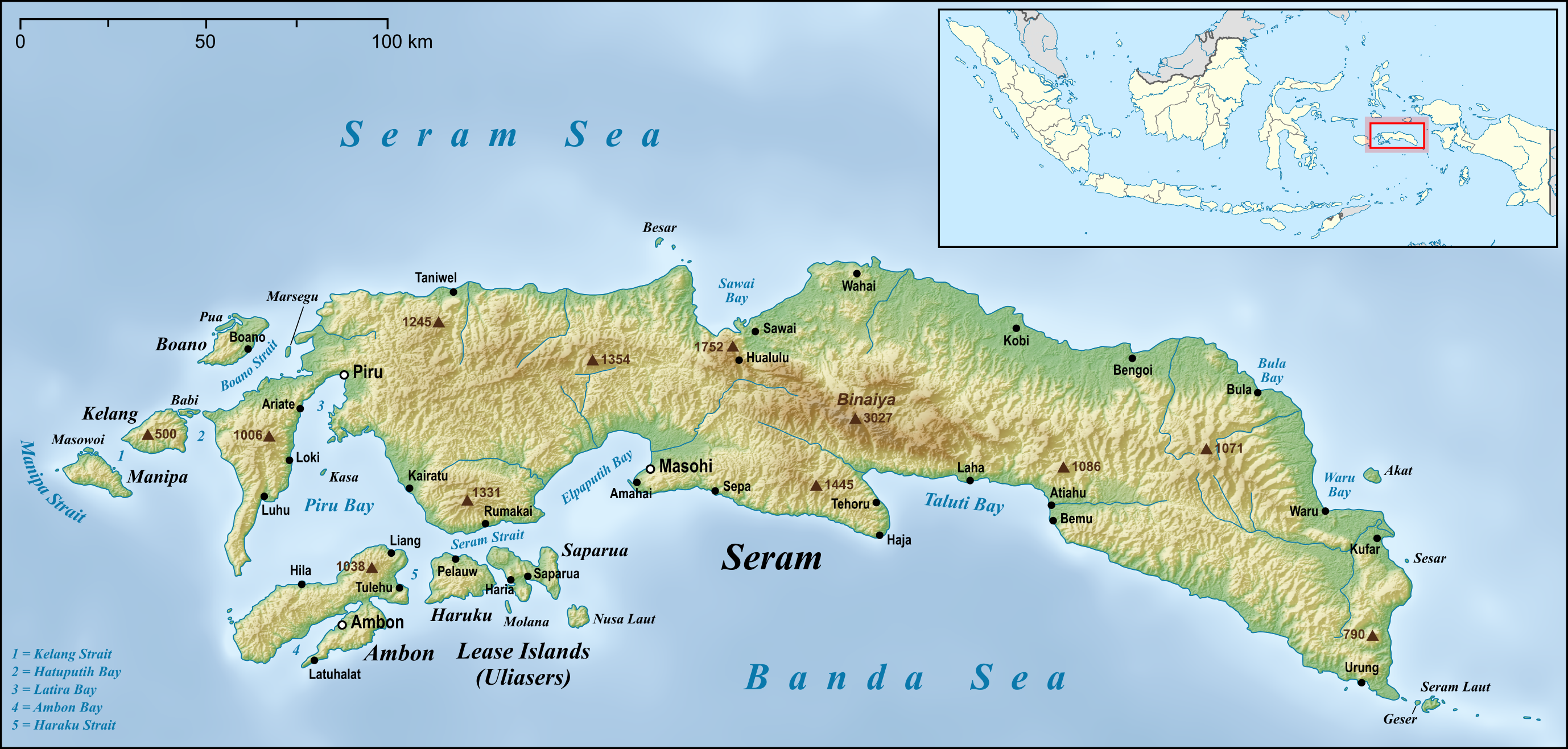
- Location of river mouth Kawa River (Maluku) Kawa River (Indonesia)

Location
- Country: Indonesia
- Province: Maluku

The Kawa River (Wae or Wai Kawa) is a river of Seram Island, Maluku province, Indonesia, about 2500 km northeast of the capital Jakarta.

== Hydrology ==
It flows in an easterly direction through the southern area of Manusela National Park, with many "small, fast-flowing rivers running through".

== Geography ==
The river flows in the southern central region of Seram island with predominantly tropical rainforest climate (designated as Af in the Köppen-Geiger climate classification). The annual average temperature in the area is 22 °C. The warmest month is December, when the average temperature is around 24 °C, and the coldest is August, at 20 °C. The average annual rainfall is 3137 mm. The wettest month is July, with an average of 494 mm rainfall, and the driest is October, with 89 mm rainfall.

Kawa River

Climate chart (precipitation, max. and min. temperature)
J	F	M	A	M	J	J	A	S	O	N	D
208 23 20	191 23 22	245 25 19	275 22 22	382 22 21	352 22 21	494 23 20	311 22 17	160 25 20	89 24 20	166 24 21	264 25 22
- █ Average max. and min. temperatures in °C
- █ Precipitation totals in mm
Imperial conversion
J	F	M	A	M	J	J	A	S	O	N	D
8.2 73 68	7.5 73 72	9.6 77 66	11 72 72	15 72 70	14 72 70	19 73 68	12 72 63	6.3 77 68	3.5 75 68	6.5 75 70	10 77 72
- █ Average max. and min. temperatures in °F
- █ Precipitation totals in inches

== See also ==
- List of drainage basins of Indonesia
- List of rivers of Indonesia
- List of rivers of Maluku (province)
