= Way =

Way or WAY may refer to:

== Paths ==
- a road, route, trail, path or pathway, including long-distance paths
- a straight rail or track on a machine tool (such as that on the bed of a lathe) on which part of the machine slides
- Ways, large slipway in shipbuilding, the ramps down which a ship is pushed in order to be launched
- Way (vessel), a ship's speed or momentum

== Religion ==
- "The Way", New Testament term for Christianity
- Way of the Cross, Christian devotion that commemorates the events of Good Friday following 14 stations, taking the form of a spiritual pilgrimage through contemplation and meditation of the Passion of Christ
- Tao (Chinese: "The Way" 道), a philosophical concept (cf. Taoism)
- Way, plural Wayob, spirit companions appearing in mythology and folklore of Maya peoples of the Yucatán Peninsula

== Places ==
- Lake Way, a dry lake in Western Australia
- Way, Mississippi
- Way, St Giles in the Wood, historic estate in St Giles in the Wood, Devon

== Music ==
- WAY-FM Network, a network of Christian music radio stations in the USA
- WAY FM (Michigan), the tradename of a group of radio stations owned by Cornerstone University in Grand Rapids, Michigan
- Ways (album), by Japanese rock band Show-Ya
- "Ways", 1968 single by The Candymen
- "Ways", 2018 song by Smokepurpp from Bless Yo Trap
- "Ways", 2019 song by Third Eye Blind from Screamer

== Other uses ==
- WAY Widowed and Young, a British charity supporting people widowed at a young age
- Way (surname)
- Way (machine tool element)

== See also ==
- The Way (disambiguation)
- WAYS (disambiguation)
- Wey (disambiguation)
- Whey (disambiguation)
- Wei (disambiguation)
