= Wei =

Wei or WEI may refer to:

== States ==
- Wey (state) (衛, 1040–209 BC), Wèi in pinyin, but spelled Wey to distinguish from the bigger Wèi of the Warring States
- Wei (state) (魏, 403–225 BC), one of the seven major states of the Warring States period
- Cao Wei (曹魏, 220–266), ruled North China during the Three Kingdoms period
- Ran Wei (冉魏, 350–352), short-lived Sixteen Kingdoms period state
- Northern Wei (北魏, 386–535), ruled North China during the Southern and Northern Dynasties, later split into:

- Western Wei (西魏, 535–557)
- Eastern Wei (東魏, 534–550)

- Zhai Wei (翟魏, 388–392), state of Dingling/Gaoche ethnicity in China

== Places ==
- Wei River, a main tributary of the Yellow River
- Wei County, Handan (魏县), Hebei, China
- Wei County, Xingtai (威县), Hebei, China

== People ==
- Wei (given name), different variations of Chinese given names
- Wei (surname), various Chinese surnames (魏, 衛, 尉, 蔿, 韋)
- Wei Wei (disambiguation)

== Astronomy ==
- One of three Chinese constellations:
  - Wěi (尾), meaning Tail
  - Wēi (危), meaning Rooftop
  - Wèi (胃), meaning Stomach
- Wèi (魏), the Chinese name for the star Delta Herculis
- Wei, a name sometimes used for Epsilon Scorpii, after the Tail constellation

== Other uses ==
- WEi, a South Korean boy group
- Wei (rank), a company-grade officer in Chinese armed forces
- Wei (value token), a subunit of the Ether value token on the Ethereum blockchain
- Wau Ecology Institute, Wau, Papua New Guinea
- Web Environment Integrity, a Web API proposed by Google
- Windows Experience Index (WEI) score, a measure of the user-perceived performance of a computer running Microsoft Windows
- Weipa Airport (IATA code: WEI), Weipa, Queensland, Australia
- Wei Empire, a fictional state and planetary romance series of Yulia Latynina

== See also ==
- Way (disambiguation)
- Wee (disambiguation)
- Wey (disambiguation)
- Whey (disambiguation)
- Weixiu
