= Wey =

Wey or WEY may refer to:

== Places ==
- Wey (state) (衞), or Wei, ancient Chinese state during the Zhou Dynasty
- River Wey, river in Surrey, Hampshire and West Sussex, England
- River Wey (Dorset), river of Dorset, south west England
- Wey and Arun Canal, canal in the south of England
- Wey and Godalming Navigations, navigable parts of the River Wey, in Surrey, England

== People ==
- Joseph Edet Akinwale Wey (died 1990), Nigerian naval officer
- Thomas Wey, English politician
- Van Van Wey (1924–1991), American racing driver
- Wey Daw-ming (1899–1978), Chinese diplomat

== Measurements ==
- Wey (unit), historical unit of mass/weight and volume

== Companies ==
- Wey (marque), a Chinese luxury SUV manufacturer and subsidiary company of Great Wall Motors

== Transport ==
- Weymouth railway station, Dorset, England (National Rail station code)

== Other ==
- Wey, a variant spelling of the Mexican colloquialism güey

== See also ==
- Whey (disambiguation)
- Wei (disambiguation)
- Way (disambiguation)
