= Sikula River =

River in Ambon Island, Maluku

Sikula River Way Sikula
- Location of river mouth

Location
- Country: Indonesia
- Province: Maluku
- City: Ambon

Physical characteristics
- Mouth: Ambon Bay
  - coordinates: 3°43′21″S 128°5′3″E
- Length: 15.5 km

The Sikula River is a river in Ambon Island, Maluku, Indonesia. It primarily flows in the Laha village of Ambon City, and is the longest river within the city's boundaries.

The river's course passes near the Pattimura International Airport, and in 2013 the river's flooding inundated the airport. Pebble is quarried along the river, generating pollution in the water.

== See also ==
- List of drainage basins of Indonesia
