= Whey (disambiguation) =

Whey is a dairy manufacturing byproduct.

Whey may also refer to:

- Whey (unit), a unit of weight for butter and cheese
- WHEY, a radio station in Michigan, United States

== See also ==
- Curds and whey (disambiguation)
- Way (disambiguation)
- Wei (disambiguation)
- Wey (disambiguation)
