= WAYS =

WAYS may refer to:

== Acronyms ==
- Waverley Action for Youth Services, a non-profit in Sydney, Australia
- World Association of Young Scientists, formerly World Academy of Young Scientists

== United States mass media ==
- WAYS (AM), a radio station (1050 AM) currently licensed to Conway, South Carolina, United States
- WAYS (1500 AM), a defunct radio station (1500 AM) formerly licensed to Macon, Georgia, United States
- WPZS, a radio station (610 AM) licensed to Charlotte, North Carolina, United States, which held the call sign WAYS from 1941 to 1984
- WAYS-TV, a UHF television station (channel 36) licensed to Charlotte, North Carolina, United States from 1954 to 1955; see WCCB

== Other ==
- An alternative name for a slipway
