= Wèi (surname) =

- Wei character in ancient script on top, standard script at bottom
- Romanisation: Wei, Ngai

Origin
- Origin: Wei (魏), a fief (located in Ruicheng, Shanxi) from Mi 羋

Wei (魏) is the English spelling of a Chinese surname.

== Notable people surnamed Wei (魏) ==
During the Zhou dynasty, Wei (state) (魏) the Ji family acquired the surname Wèi (魏). During the Northern Wei (北魏), Xiaowen family got the surname Wei with the state name.

In 636 BC, Prince Chong’er became a Hegemon of China. One of his followers, Wei Wuzi had a son, Wei Qi. Prince Chong’er gave Wei Qi the fiefs of Lü and Chu. As a result, most of Wei Qi's descendants changed their last name to Lü

During the Ming dynasty, Gao (高) and Li (李) family changed their surname to Wei. Wei is also a surname used by some Chinese minorities.

In 2019 it was the 45th most common surname in mainland China.

It is the 30th name on the Hundred Family Surnames poem.

- Vision Wei (魏晨), Chinese singer and actor
- Wei Wei (murderer), executed for murder in Japan by Masako Mori
- Wei Pengyuan, sentenced to death for bribery
- Wei Hongtian, Chinese diplomat
- Wei Wenbo (魏文伯), Chinese politician and revolutionary
- Wei Jingsheng (魏京生), Chinese dissident
- Wei Kuo-yen (魏國彥), Minister of Environmental Protection Administration of the Republic of China (2014–2016)
- Wei Ming-ku (魏明谷), Magistrate of Changhua County (2014–2018)
- Wei Qiuyue (魏秋月), Chinese volleyball player
- Wei Tao-ming (魏道明), ambassador, mayor of Nanjing, governor of Taiwan, foreign minister
- Wei Xiaoyuan (魏晓媛), Chinese artistic gymnast
- Wei Yan (魏延), a military officer of Shu during the Three Kingdoms period
- Wei Yao-chien (魏耀乾), member of Legislative Yuan (1990–1996)
- Wei Yaxin (born 2000), Chinese badminton player
- Empress Xiaoyichun (simplified Chinese: 孝仪纯皇后; traditional Chinese: 孝儀純皇后; pinyin: Xiàoyíchún Huánghòu) consort of the Qianlong Emperor and mother of the Jiaqing Emperor, posthumously became an Empress of the Qing dynasty
- Wei Yung (魏鏞), Minister of the Research, Development and Evaluation Commission of the Republic of China (1976–1988)
- Wei Zheng (魏徵), the statesman of the Tang dynasty
- Wei Zhongxian (魏忠賢), eunuch, original name Li Jinzhong
- Katherine Wei-Sender, Chinese American bridge player and spouse of C. C. Wei
- C. C. Wei (魏重庆), Chinese American bridge player
- Dexter Goei, Chinese-Indonesian American businessman
- Alan Budikusuma (魏仁芳), Indonesian badminton player
- Daniel Gooi Zi Sen (魏子森), Malaysian politician
- Gooi Hsiao Leung, Malaysian politician
- Juncheng Wei, mathematician
- Wee Ka Siong (魏家祥), Malaysian politician

== Notable people surnamed Wei (尉) ==
Wèi (尉) family name originated from Wei family of Zheng (郑国), Yu family of Xia dynasty (复), and royal of Northern Wei (北魏), and many more.

- Wei Liao (尉缭, Wèi Liáo) – a strategist of Warring States period, purported writer of the classic military text Wei Liaozi

== Notable people surnamed Wei (蔿) ==
Wěi (蔿) family name from the Yuan (surname) (薳) the form a Xiong (surname) (熊) of Chu (state).

== Other notable people surnamed Wei ==
- Belle Wei, American electric engineer and educator

== See also ==
- Wei (given name)
- List of common Chinese surnames
- Hundred Family Surnames
