= Masiwang language =

Austronesian language spoken in Maluku, Indonesia

Masiwang
- Bonfia
- Native to: Indonesia (Maluku Islands)
- Region: Seram
- Native speakers: (1,000 cited 1989)
- Language family: Austronesian: Malayo-Polynesian; Central–Eastern; Central Maluku; East Central Maluku; East Seram; Masiwang

Language codes
- ISO 639-3: bnf
- Glottolog: masi1266

Masiwang is a language of Seram, Indonesia.
