= WÆE =

Swedish pop music band

WÆE is a Swedish pop music band. It consists of Mikael Carlsson (formerly of The Honeydrips) and Mathias Nilsson (formerly of Twig). According to the band, their purpose is to combine their love of black metal with their love of dub. Their debut EP "resa till mark" was released 11 January 2011 on Bandcamp.
