= Wee Wee Hill =

Hill in Indiana, United States

- Location within Indiana

Highest point
- Elevation: 981 ft (299 m)
- Coordinates: 39°20′38″N 084°59′50″W

Geography
- Location: Highland Township, Franklin County, Indiana

Wee Wee Hill (also known as Wewe Hill) is a hill in Highland Township, Franklin County, Indiana, in the United States. With an elevation of 981 feet (299 m), it is the 19th highest summit in Indiana.

The summit has been noted for its unusual place name. A nearby county road is named after the hill, using the spelling "Wewe".
