= TPP Nikola Tesla =

Coal-fired power plant complex in Serbia

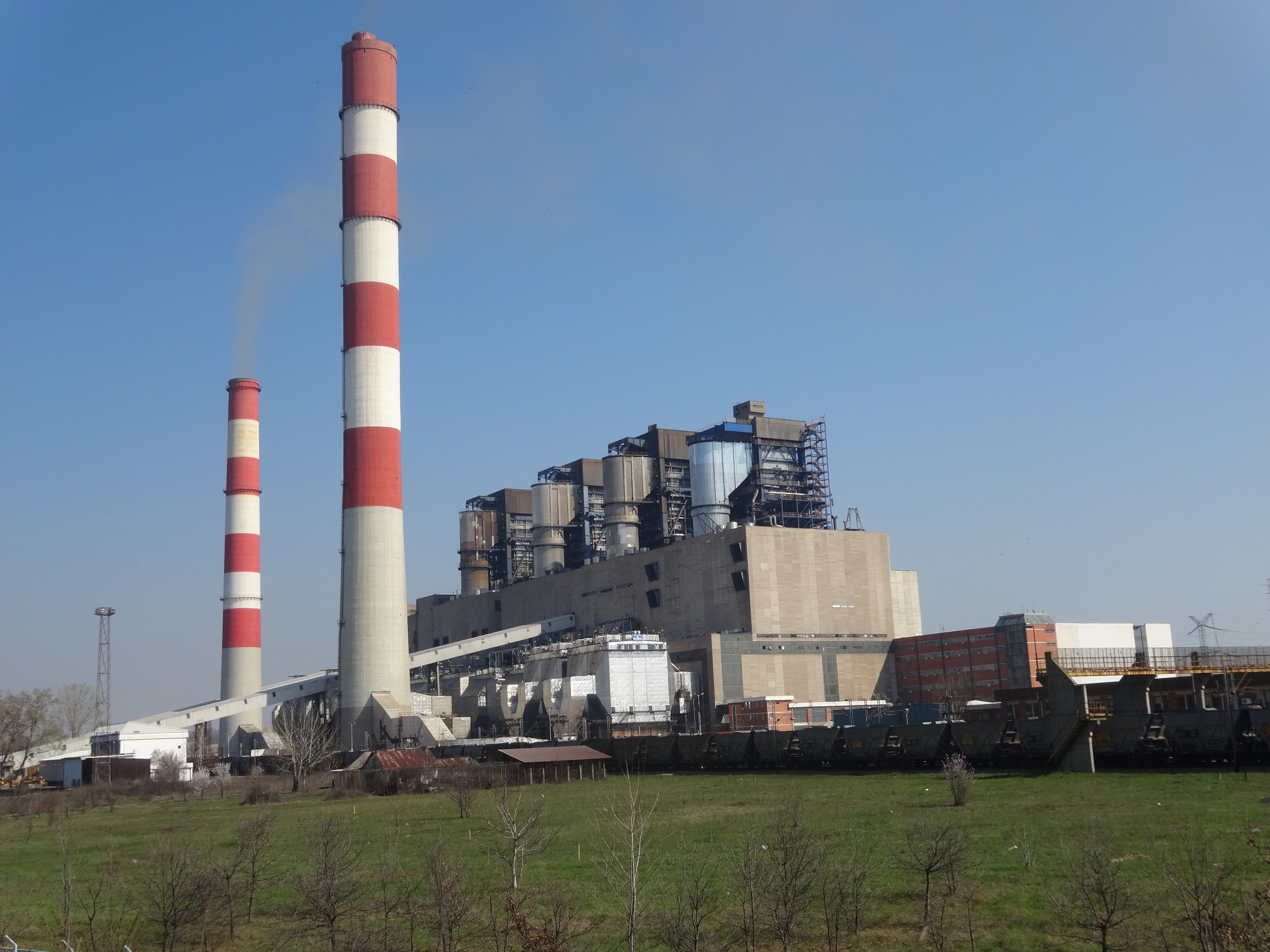
- View on TPP Nikola Tesla, March 2014
- Country: Serbia
- Location: Obrenovac, Belgrade
- Coordinates: 44°40′18″N 20°09′26″E
- Status: Operational
- Owner: Elektroprivreda Srbije (EPS)
- Operator: Elektroprivreda Srbije

Thermal power station
- Primary fuel: Coal

Power generation
- Units operational: 13 (Combined, 2025)
- Nameplate capacity: 3,138 MW (Combined, 2025)
- Annual net output: 14,630 GWh (Combined, 2025)

External links
- Commons: Related media on Commons

TPP Nikola Tesla, commonly known as TENT, is a thermal power plant complex owned and operated by Elektroprivreda Srbije (EPS). It is the largest power plant complex with four power plants (TPP Nikola Tesla A, and TPP Nikola Tesla B, TPP Kolubara, and TPP Morava) in Serbia, as it generates around 14,630 GWh annually, which covers 47.88% of total EPS annual production (as of 2025).

These power plants use lignite mined from the Kolubara coal basin as fuel. For two of its plants (TPP Nikola Tesla A, and TPP Nikola Tesla B), the nearby river of Sava is used as the power plant's water cooling source. The coal is transported from the mines via a 30 km long standard-gauge railroad capable of supplying 37 million tons of coal a year. The complex is named in honor of Nikola Tesla.

== Power plants ==
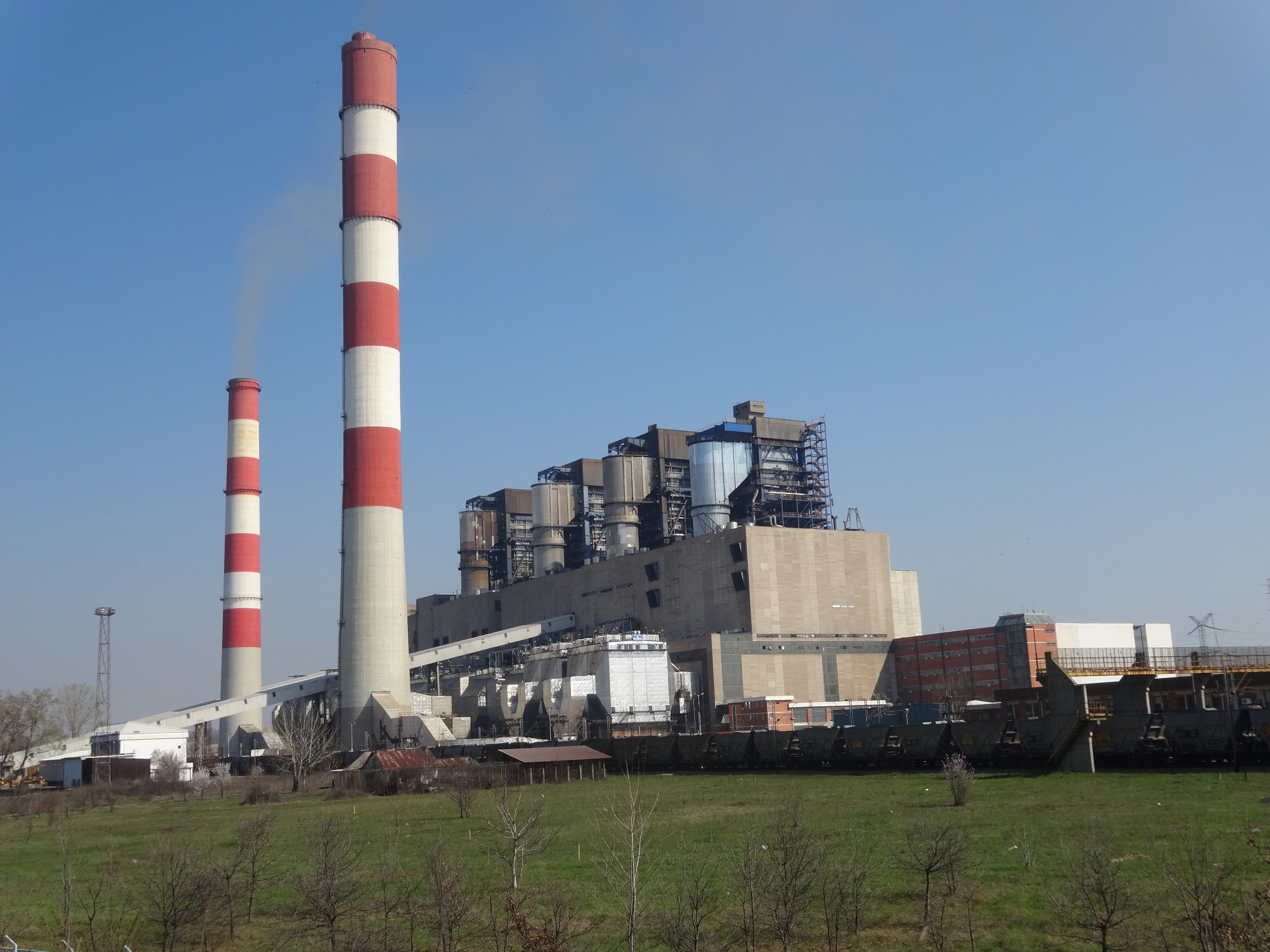
TPP Nikola Tesla A

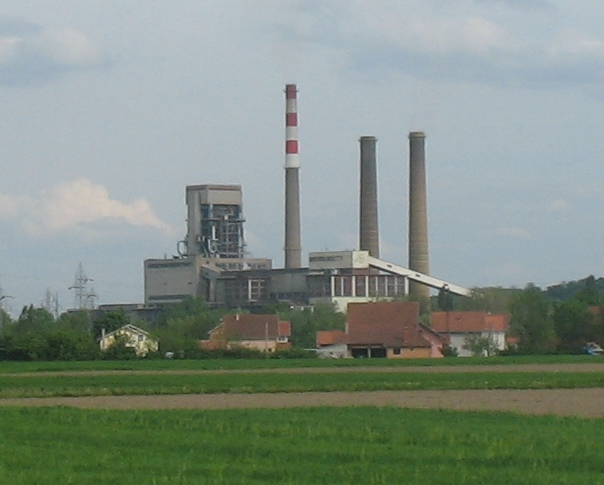
TPP Kolubara

=== TPP Nikola Tesla A ===
The power plant is located on the right bank of the river Sava, approximately 40 km upstream from Downtown Belgrade, near the municipality of Obrenovac. It has a total of six generation units with a combined capacity of 1650.5 MW make it the largest power facility in former Yugoslavia. TPP Nikola Tesla A was first synchronised on 27 March 1970. It has two chimneys: one with a height of 220 meters and a second with a height of 150 meters.

=== TPP Nikola Tesla B ===
Located between the villages of Skela and Ušće. There are two generation units with a total capacity of 1240 MW. TPP Nikola Tesla B was first synchronised on 11 March 1983. Its chimney is 280 meters tall.

=== TPP Morava ===
The TPP Morava (part of TPP Nikola Tesla), is located on the right bank of the river Great Morava near the town of Svilajnac. It has an installed capacity (power generator) of 108 MW.

=== TPP Kolubara ===
The TPP Kolubara (part of TPP Nikola Tesla) is located at the edge of the Kolubara coal basin in the village of Veliki Crljeni. It has an installed capacity of 216 MW.

== Railway transport of TPP Nikola Tesla ==
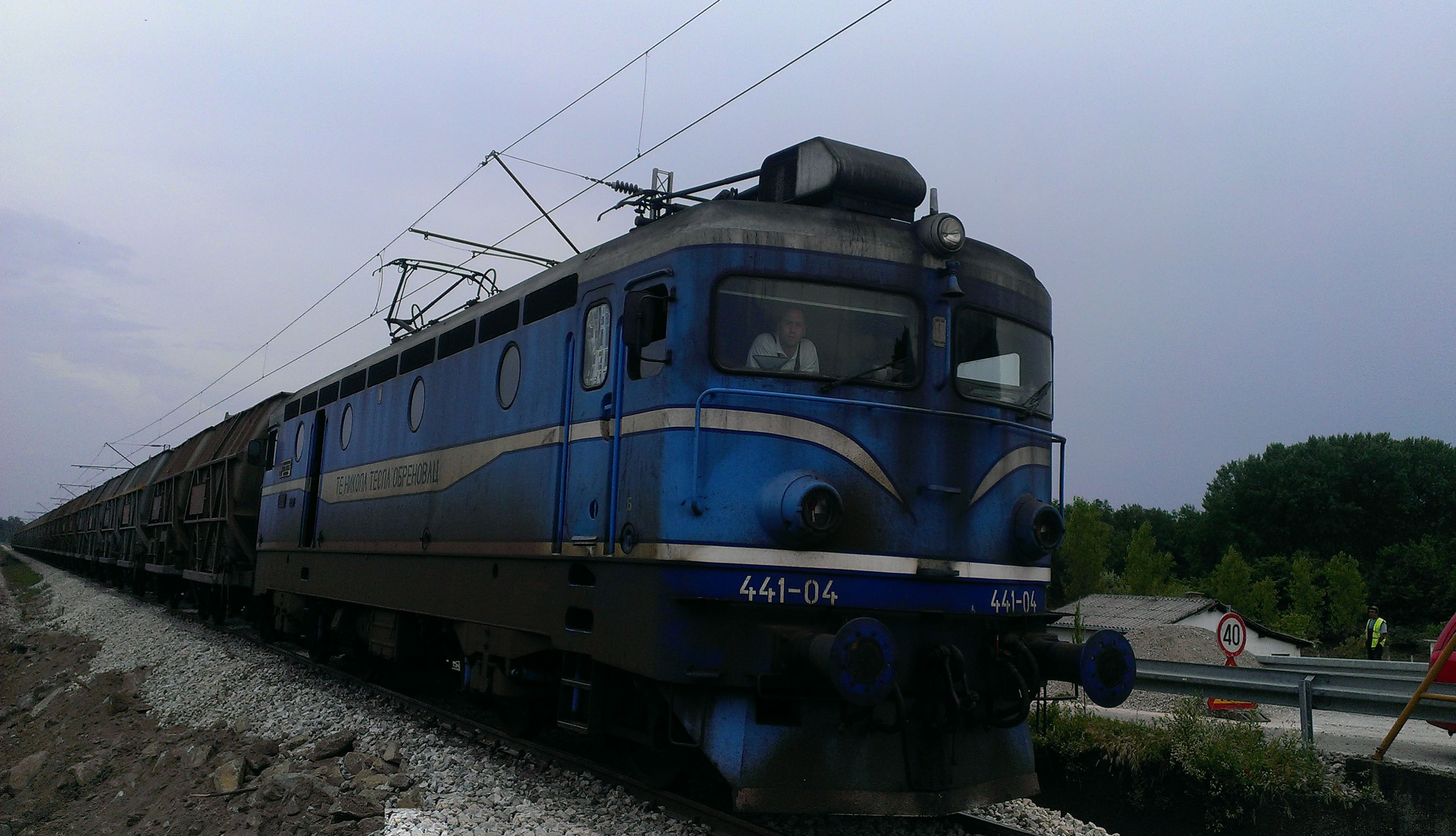
Class 441 electric locomotive of TPP Nikola Tesla.

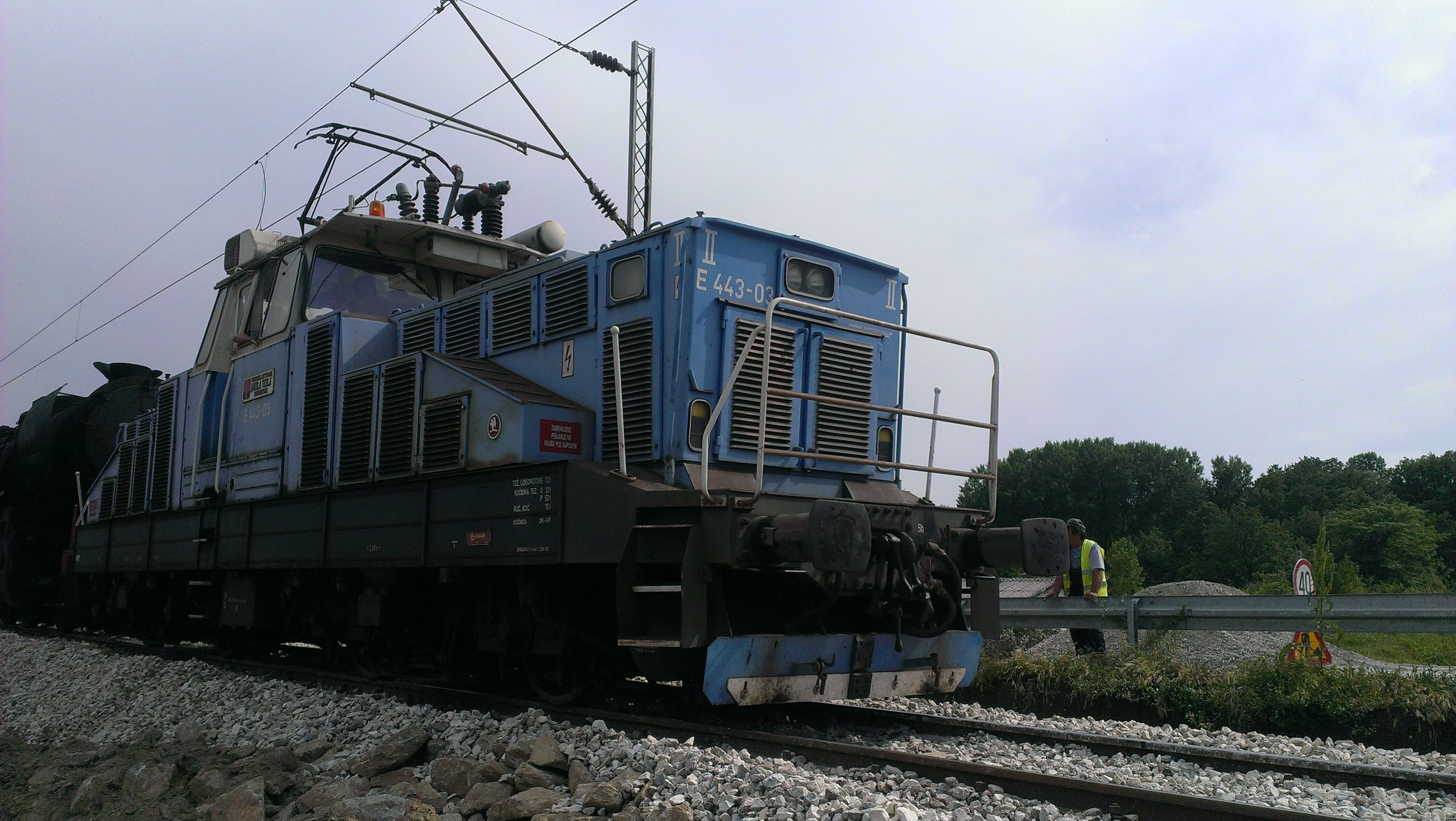
Class 443 electric locomotive of TPP Nikola Tesla.

TPP Nikola Tesla operates its own railway with over 100 km of trackage total. The railway is used for transporting coal from the mines to the power plants. It is independent from the national rail freight transport company Srbija Kargo.

=== Railroad ===
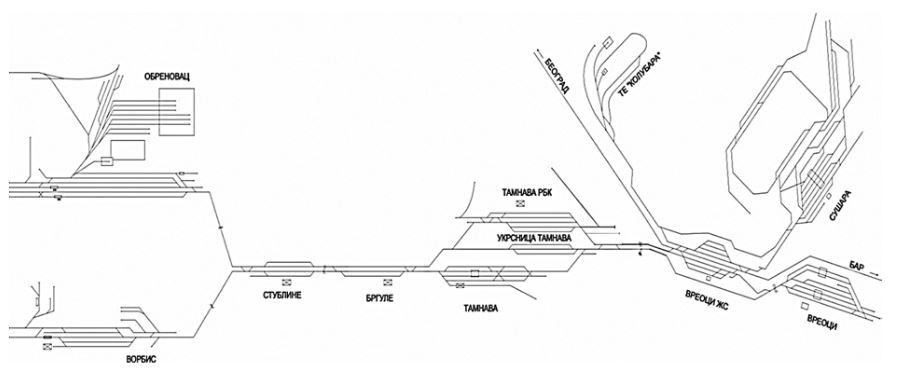
Diagram of the railway network

The railway tracks are electrified using 25 kV 50 Hz overhead lines. The line is powered from Brgule. The railway has connection to the Belgrade–Bar railway at Vreoci.

Main railway tracks:

- Obrenovac - Vreoci, 32.45 km.
  - Obrenovac - Stubline, single track, 8.05 km. Built in 1967.
  - Stubline - Brgule, double track, 10.58 km. Right track built in 1967, another, left track built in 1982.
  - Brgule - Vreoci, single track, 13.85 km. Built in 1967.

Terminal railway tracks:

- Stubline - Vorbis, single track, 14.42 km. Built in 1979.
- Brgule - Tamnava, single track, 3.32 km. Built in 1979.

=== Train stations ===
There are several loading, unloading train stations and interstations.

Loading stations:

- Vreoci - 7 rail tracks of which 4 are loading tracks with two loading places.
- Tamnava - 4 rail tracks of which 2 are loading tracks with one loading place.

Unloading stations:

- Obrenovac "A" - 5 rail tracks with of which 2 are unloading tracks with two unloading places.
- Vorbis "B" - 5 rail tracks with of which one is unloading track with one unloading place.

Interstations:

- Stubline - 4 rail tracks for regulation of traffic, switching from single track railway to double track railway.
- Brgule - 3 rail tracks for regulation of traffic, switching from single track railway to double track railway.

=== Rolling stock ===
==== Locomotives ====
The railway transport of TPP NT has a fleet of 18 electric locomotives and 8 diesel locomotives. Nine locomotives are used for freight train hauling and 16 are used for maneuvering.

Electric locomotives

- Class 441 - 8 locomotives
- Class 443 (Skoda lokomotives identical to České dráhy class 210 shunters) - 10 locomotives

Diesel locomotives

- Class 661 - 2 locomotives
- CEM - 5 locomotives

==== Wagons ====
Railway transport of TPP NT operates with 334 Class F special open high-sided wagons made by Arbel. Wagons are equipped with hydraulic installation for fast discharge, which allows to unload coal for 1–2 seconds. Each wagon is 15.16m long, has four axles and a capacity of 56.4 tons.

== See also ==
- List of power stations in Serbia
