= Verpilleux =

Verpilleux is a French surname. Notable people with the surname include:

- Claude Verpilleux (1798–1875), French mine laborer
- Émile Antoine Verpilleux (1888–1964), Anglo-Belgian artist
- Pierre de Montgolfier-Verpilleux (1831–1913), French engineer
