= Martin Bowden =

American rock wall artist (1884–1958)

- Born: September 22, 1884; Rive-de-Gier, France
- Died: July 29, 1958 (aged 73); Trinidad, Colorado, U.S.
- Occupation: Artist

Martin Bowden (September 22, 1884 – July 29, 1958) was an American artist known for his large-scale carvings and paintings along the walls of Purgatoire Canyon near Trinidad, ColoradoLas Animas County. Bowden left school when he was 14 and started working in the coal mines, later working as a cowboy and homesteading before he began making art on the walls of Purgatory Canyon over the course of 40 years. The canyon came to be known as Painted Canyon.

Legacy

Interest in Bowden's work increased during the mid-2020s following renewed historical research and documentation efforts led by independent researcher Alanna Blu. In June 2026, rock art researcher Peter Faris revisited his earlier 2015 study of Bowden, writing that the project had expanded from a "small grassroots effort" into a broader preservation initiative involving archaeologists, preservation organizations, and public outreach. Faris also noted that the effort had resulted in substantially expanded photographic documentation of Bowden's paintings and expressed support for preserving the site and its historical record.

The renewed attention included a public-interest television feature by KOAA News 5, outreach from SPACES (Saving and Preserving Arts and Cultural Environments), and work toward documenting the site for long-term preservation. Reference

Faris, Peter. The Martin Bowdin Gallery in the Purgatory Revisited. Rock Art Blog. June 13, 2026.

== Early life ==
Bowden was born on September 22, 1884, in Rive-de-Gier, near Lyon, France, to parents of Italian origin. The family's original surname was Baudino, which was anglicized to Bowden after they arrived in the United States. The family emigrated when Bowden was young and settled in Las Animas County, Colorado.

Bowden's father was a coal miner and died in an accident in 1889, when he was almost 5. His mother was left widowed with two young children, Bowden and his younger brother. In 1893, she remarried Matteo Tessidore and they had two daughters.

== Career ==
Martin Bowden left school when he was 14 and started working in the coal mines near Trinidad alongside with his stepfather, sketching on mine walls and coal carts using chalk and other available materials. Bowden later worked as a cowboy, traveling through parts of Wyoming and Montana before returning to southern Colorado. He then learned blacksmithing and metalworking in Hoehne, Colorado.

In 1911, Bowden homesteaded near Purgatory Canyon under the Homestead Acts. Conditions in the area were difficult, and Bowden eventually abandoned farming.

Around this time, he created what is now known as "The Bowden Trail" a series of large-scale carvings and paintings along the walls of Purgatory Canyon. His work consisted primarily of life-sized or near life-sized figures, including animals and non-native Americans, made directly onto sandstone surfaces. Bowden developed his artistic practice over four decades, producing more than sixty individual images within the canyon. Bowden’s process involved first chiseling outlines into the rock to create a permanent form, then applying paint, often just commercially-available house paint. Bowden had a unique method where he deeply etched a life-sized outline into the canyon walls before applying any paint.Barker, Ted (2001). "RANCH TALES — The Bowden Trail". Territorial. pp. 23–26.

== Death ==
Bowden died on July 29, 1958, from a self-inflicted gunshot wound.

In 1972, artist Patricia Jozwaikowski tried to save Bowden's work from erosion, twice writing Colorado's governor. She also composed an original poem about the artist. In 1989, Bowden was one of the overlooked historical figures depicted by artist Barbara Jo Revelle on a mural on the wall of the Colorado Convention Center.

In the 2020s, there was renewed interest in Martin Bowden’s work and community efforts to document and share materials.
