= Ann Ellis =

Ann Ellis may refer to:

- Ann Ellis Hanson, American papyrologist and historian
- Ann Ellis (strike leader), English power loom weaver and trade union leader
- Anne Ellis, American memoirist
