= SNCF Class Y 8400 =

Class Y8400
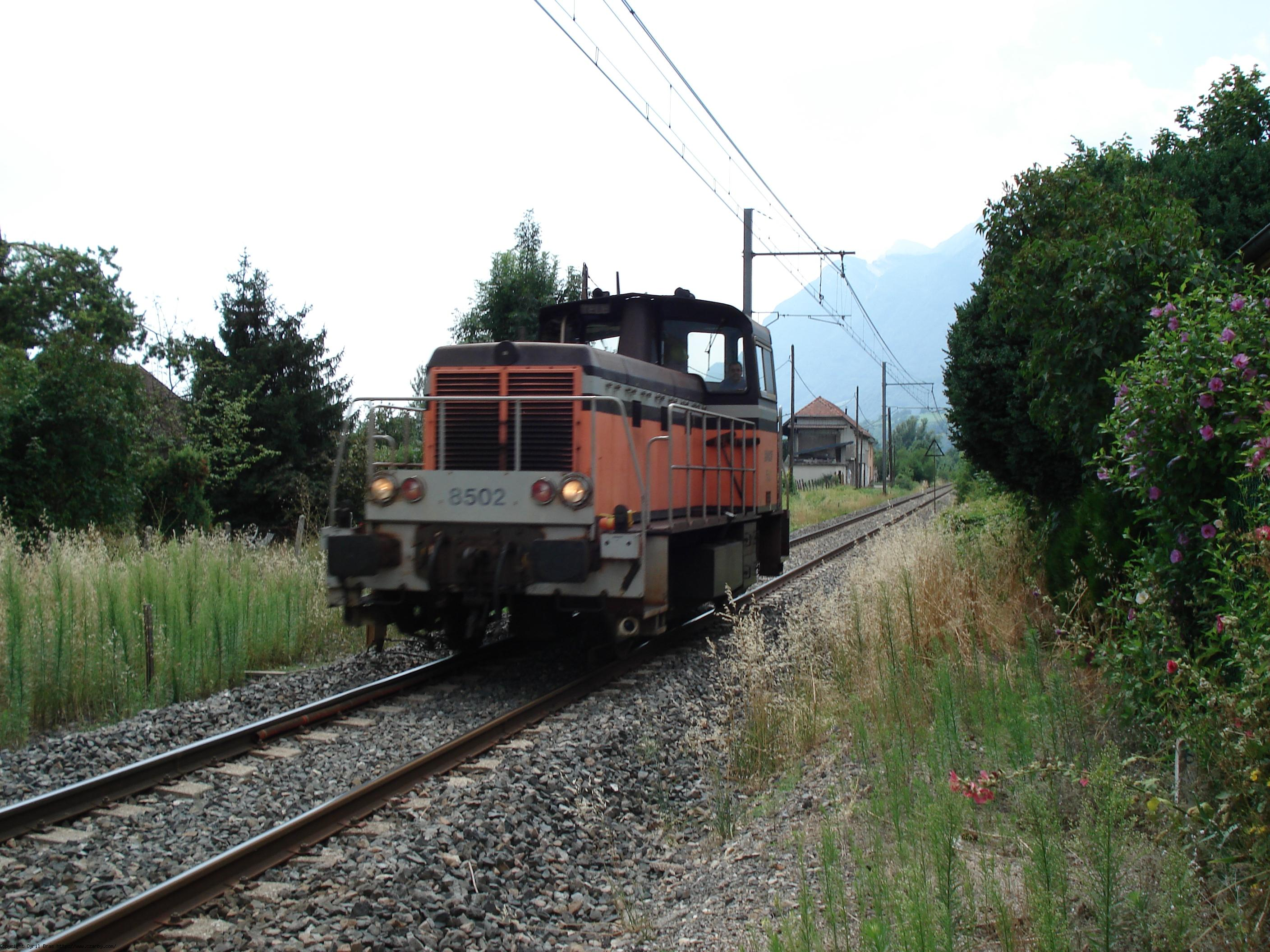
- Y 8502 in "Arzens" livery near Albertville
Type and origin
- Power type: Diesel
- Builder: (France) Arbel Fauvet Rail
- Build date: 1990–1995
- Total produced: 150
Specifications
- Configuration
  - Whyte: 0-4-0
  - UIC: B
- Gauge: 1,435 mm (4 ft 8 1/2 in) standard gauge
- Length: 10.14 m (33 ft 3 in)
- Loco weight: 36 tonnes (35 long tons; 40 short tons)
- Fuel type: Diesel
- Prime mover: Poyaud V12
- Engine type: V12 Diesel
- Transmission: Hydraulic
Performance figures
- Maximum speed: 60 km/h (37 mph)
- Power output: 205 kW (275 hp)
Career
- Operators: SNCF
- Class: Y8400
- Number in class: 150 (at 2005)
- Numbers: Y8401–Y8550

This class of small shunters has 150 members. They were delivered by Arbel Fauvet Rail in the early 1990s and seem to have been spread across France. They have the 0-4-0 ("B") wheel arrangement, 200 kW diesel engines and hydraulic transmission.
