= Anne Ellis =

American author (1875–1938)

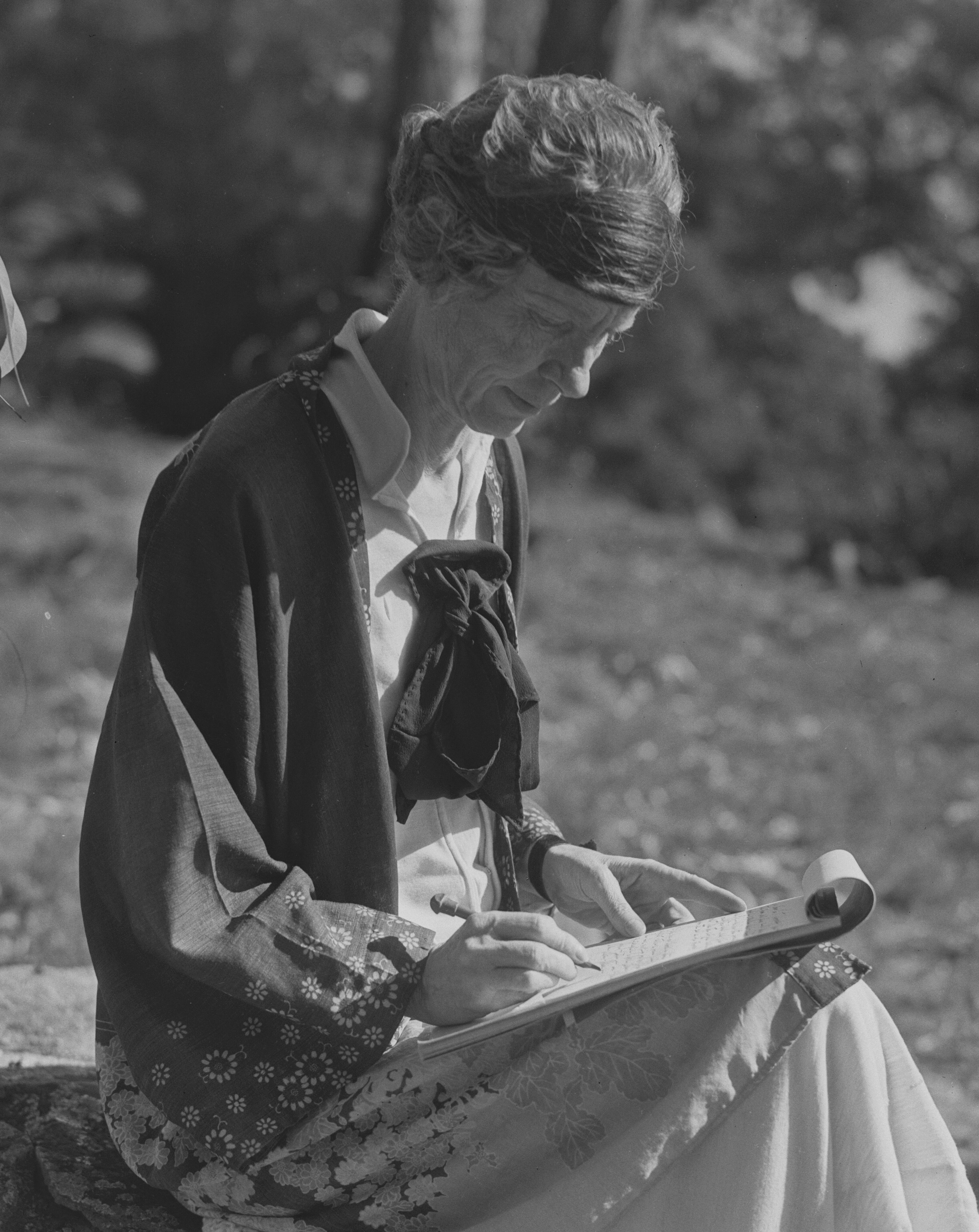
- Anne Ellis, Santa Barbara, 1935
- Born: Anna Heister; May 4, 1875; Christian County, Missouri, U.S.
- Died: August 27, 1938 (aged 63); Denver, Colorado, U.S.
- Occupations: Writer, local official, seamstress, cook
- Writing career
- Genre: memoir

Anne L. Heister Ellis (May 4, 1875 – August 27, 1938) was an American author and local official who wrote two memoirs chronicling her life in Colorado coal mining camps and her struggles with asthma, including at sanitariums.

== Early life and career ==
Anna Heister was born in Christian County, Missouri, the daughter of Albert Lawrence Heister and Rachel Swearengen Heister (later Leavitt). She traveled West with her extended family in a covered wagon, and grew up in mining camps near Bonanza, Colorado.

Ellis supported herself as a seamstress when she was a young widow with two children. Later she worked as a camp cook. She was the elected treasurer of Saguache County from 1918 to 1924. She went to New Mexico to recover her health, and started writing in her convalescence, encouraged by Santa Fe writer and artist Ina Sizer Cassidy. She covered subjects including poverty, bereavement, sheep shearing, race relations, Native Americans, county politics, and equal rights conventions in her writing. She was working on a fourth book, In White Bread Time, when she died in 1938.

== Publications ==
- The Life of An Ordinary Woman (1929)
- Plain Anne Ellis: More About the Life of an Ordinary Woman (1931)
- Sunshine Preferred; The Philosophy of an Ordinary Woman (1934)

== Personal life and legacy ==
Ellis married George Fleming in 1894; he died in a mining accident in 1898, when they had two young daughters, Nita and Joy. She married Herbert Manville Ellis in 1901, and had a son, Earl. Her younger daughter died from diphtheria in 1907, and her second husband died in 1911. She moved to Santa Barbara, California, in 1931. She died in Denver in 1938, at the age of 63.

Ellis's face is among those included in a tile mural created by Barbara Jo Revelle in 1989 at the Colorado Convention Center. In 1995, the gravestone she hand-carved for her daughter's grave in Goldfield, Nevada, was replaced by the state. As of 1996 the Saguache County Museum in Saguache, Colorado had a display on Ellis. The University of Colorado awarded her an honorary degree in April 1938, and has a collection of her papers.
