= Lucien Arbel =

French draftsman (1826–1892)

- Lucien Arbel
- Born: 5 September 1826; Saint-Lupicin, Jura, France
- Died: 20 February 1892 (aged 65); Paris, France
- Occupation: Industrialist
- Known for: Senator

Lucien Arbel (5 September 1826 – 20 February 1892) was a French draftsman who became a machinist and then an engineer. He started his own metalworking business and became a major industrialist. He was also a deputy and then a senator of France. His business was passed down to his sons and later evolved into Arbel Fauvet Rail.

== Early years ==
Lucien Arbel was born on 5 September 1826 in Saint-Lupicin, Jura. He graduated from the engineering school Arts et Métiers ParisTech in the town of Aix-en-Provence. Lucien Arbel worked as a draftsman in Paris, then as an engine fireman and machinist, then as a mine engineer in the mines at Tartaras near Rive-de-Gier.

In 1856 he entered a partnership with the Deflassieux brothers, who made products for the railroad companies. The firm was called "Arbel, Deflessieux Frères et Peillon." He came up with a revolutionary design for a single-cast railroad wheel, and later developed a cheap-to-manufacture design for wheels with counterweights. As a result of his inventions, the company was employing 150 people by 1861. In 1869 he founded his own company, "Forges de Couzon", to make wheels and axles for locomotives and railway wagons. The Établissements Arbel opened the large Couzon factory in Rive-de-Gier. The company was to be one of the ancestors of Arbel Fauvet Rail.

During the Franco-Prussian War (1870–71) Arbel was a Colonel of the National Guard.

== Politician ==
With no political background, Arbel was the National Assembly candidate for Loire of the Conservative Republicans in the 8 February 1871 elections. He sat in the center-left, and voted with the "reasonable" Republicans. On 24 May 1873 he refrained from voting on the proposal to refuse the resignation of Adolphe Thiers. Later he spoke against the Albert de Broglie ministry, and voted for the proposal by Pascal Duprat to elect senators by universal suffrage, and for all the constitutional laws.

On 30 June 1876, standing as a very moderate Republican, Arbel was narrowly elected to the Senate for Loire in the third round of voting. On 5 January 1879 he was re-elected. The sculptor Frédéric Auguste Bartholdi, the designer of the Statue of Liberty, exhibited a bust of Lucien Arbel in the Salon of 1879. He sat on the center left in the Senate, and he constantly voted with that caucus until 5 January 1888, when he was replaced by M. Brunon, another ironmaster and republican candidate.

== Later years ==
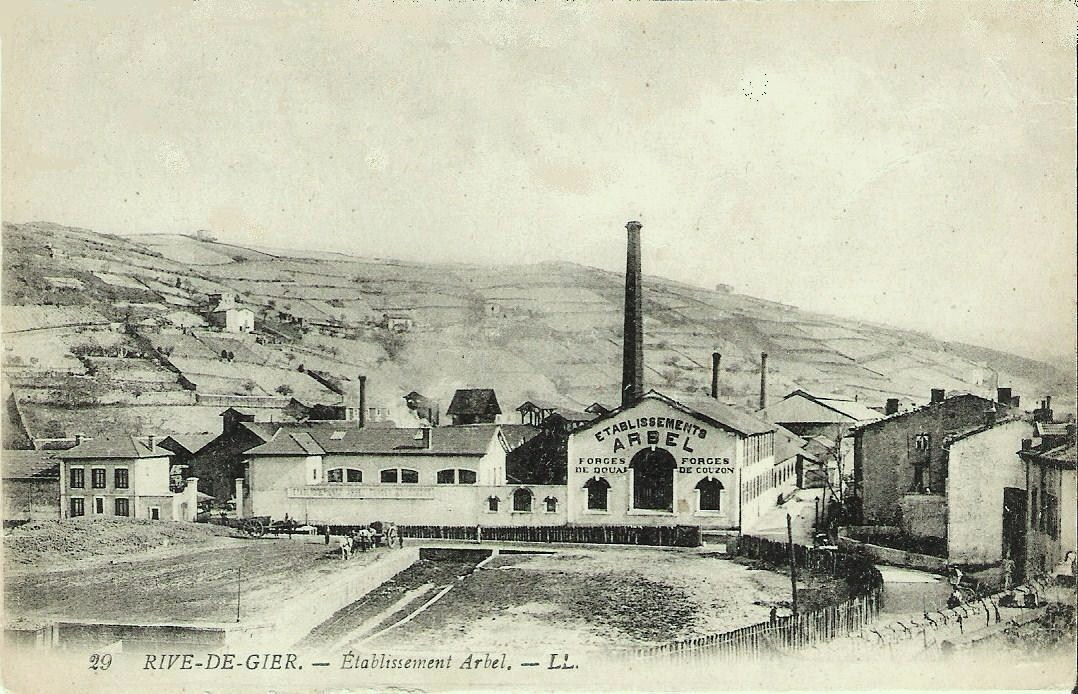
Arbel factory in Rive-de-Gier at the start of the 20th century

In 1878 Lucien Arbel entered a partnership with his oldest son, Antoine, aged 23. In 1882 a forty-ton steam hammer designed by Lucien Arbel and built by the Compagnie de l'Horme was installed at the works in Rive-de-Gier. The single-acting hammer (Note: A single-acting steam hammer is raised by steam but falls under gravity.) was specially designed to forge locomotive wheels up to 2.3 metres (7 ft 7 in) in diameter and other very wide forgings.

In 1882 Arbel's second son, Pierre, joined the partnership. Lucien Arbel remained at the head of the firm until 1888, when he retired. After 1888 his sons undertook a huge expansion of the plant, starting with a new forging plant near Rive-de-Gier at Couzon. In 1890 Lucien Arbel and his son, Pierre Arbel (1858–1934), founded Forges de Douai for the manufacture of railway cars and heavy metal parts. Pierre Arbel took on the direction of the company.

Lucien Arbel died on 20 February 1892 in Paris aged 65.

== Sources ==
- "Arbel, Famille". Archives Nationales.
- Gordon, David M. (1996-01-01). Liberalism and Social Reform: Industrial Growth and Progressiste Politics in France, 1880-1914. Greenwood Publishing Group. p. 85. ISBN 978-0-313-29811-0.
- Lambert-Dansette, Jean (2001-09-01). Histoire de l'entreprise et des chefs d'entreprise en France: Le temps des pionniers (1830-1880) - Naissance du patronat -. Editions L'Harmattan. ISBN 978-2-296-25956-0.
- "Présentation du groupe Arbel". Arbel Fauvet Rail.
- Robert, Adolphe; Cougny, Gaston (1889). Dictionnaire Des Parlementaires Français, Comprenant Tous Les Membres Des Assemblées Françaises Et Tous Les Ministres Français Depuis ... 1789 Jusqu'au 1er Mai, 1889 (PDF).
- "Sélection des œuvres d'Auguste Bartholdi". Centre départemental de documentation pédagogique du Haut-Rhin.
- "The Arbel 40-Ton Hammer". Railway Locomotives and Cars. Simmons-Boardman Publishing Corporation. 1888. p. 458.
