= Arbel Fauvet Rail =

French railway rolling stock manufacturer

Coordinates: 50.368795°N 3.096213°E

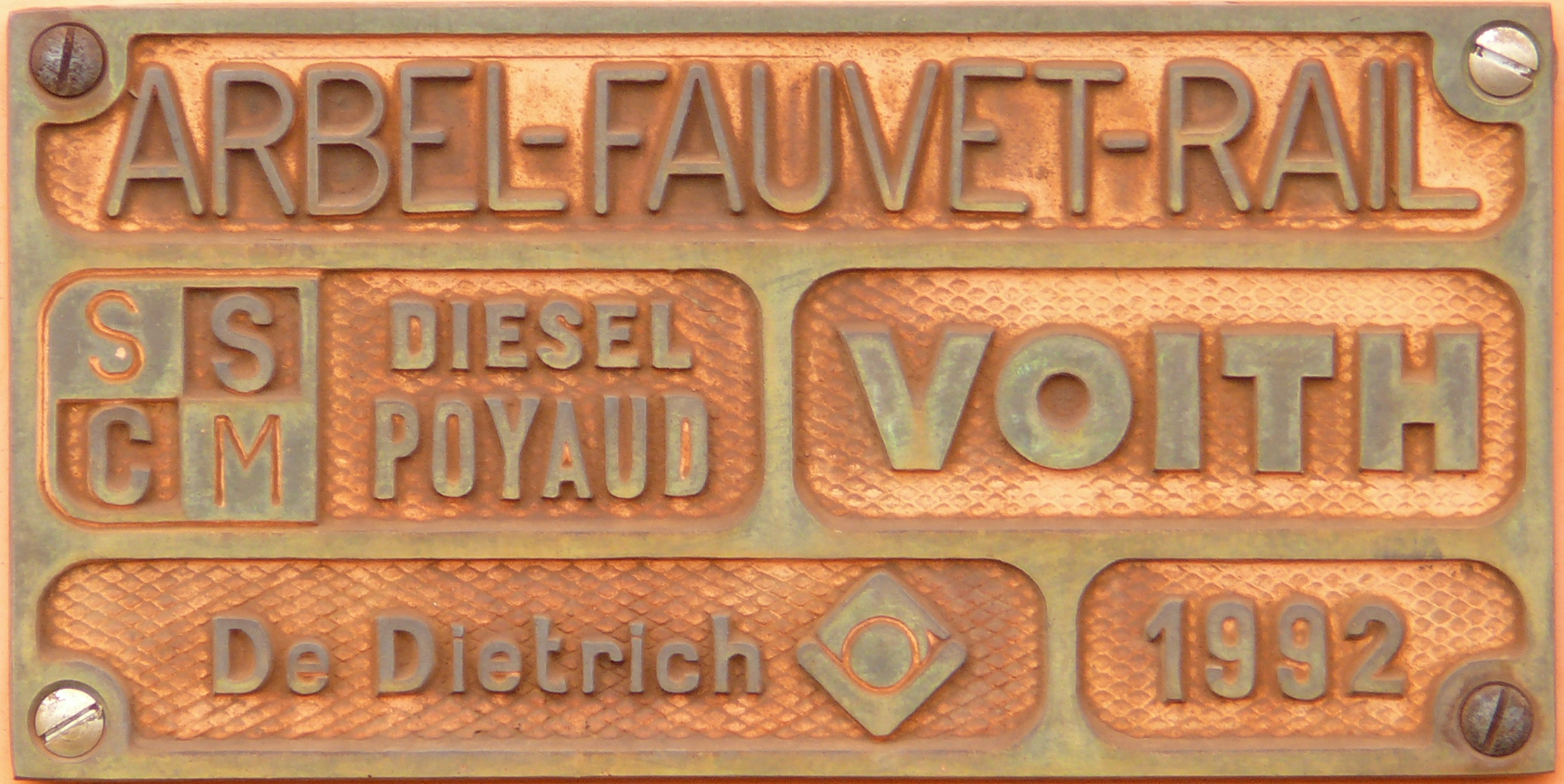
- Industry: Railway rolling stock
- Founded: 1985
- Headquarters: Douai, France
- Key people: Pascal Varin (CEO)
- Parent: Titagarh Wagons
- Website: www.millet-afr.com

Arbel Fauvet Rail (AFR) is a railway rolling stock manufacturer based in Douai, France. In 2010 the company was acquired by Titagarh Wagons and renamed AFR Titagarh.

== History ==
=== Arbel ===
The company's history dates to 1856 when Lucien Arbel in association with the Deflaissieux brothers began business in Rive-de-Gier in the Loire area of France; in 1869 he founded the Forges de Couzon on the river Couzon in Rive-de-Gier. The factory made a variety of different metal parts including wheels for railway vehicles. In 1890 Lucien Arbel's son Pierre travelled to northern and eastern France to study the industrial development there, and as a consequence 5 hectares land was bought from the city of Douai in northern France for industrial development. In 1894 the Forges de Douai was founded as public company (Société anonyme) with Pierre and Lucien Arbel as directors.

In 1896 the company began stamping sheet metal, and in 1900 the plant expanded to include a Martin process hearth (7 tonnes capacity), and facilities to forge wheels; the plant had three activities: forging, machining, and stamping. The company continued to expand in the 1900s; with orders from the Compagnie du Midi for high capacity wagons, and a large order from the Compagnie du Nord the business acquired 3 more hectares of land in Douai to build a second plant in 1908 specialising in railway vehicles. Parts for artillery pieces, and other military equipment began to be produced around this time in Douai. In 1910 a third plant was opened which included an open hearth furnace, a steel plate mill and other equipment for the working of steel.

By 1914 the plants in Douai covered over 86,000 m^{2} and the Société Arbel was employing 2500 workers. The factory was occupied by German troops during the First World War from October 1914; during the latter part of the war the occupation became destructive with assets removed, and later destroyed in situ. By the recapture of the plant in 1918 essentially all the factory's equipment had been looted, and much of the buildings also removed or destroyed.

Rebuilding of the plant took place through the 1920s; the primary steel production of open hearth furnaces and mills were not rebuilt, the new equipment is focussed on wagon production and metal stamping. Re construction was complete by 1922.

In 1929 the plants in Couzon were sold to the Compagnie générale du duralumin et du cuivre (Cégédur) and the company was renamed Établissements Arbel in 1936.

During the Second World War the factory was extensively damaged in 1940 and 1944. After rebuilding, the factory in Douai continued the tradition of wagon construction and metal forming. After 1970 the plant became a subsidiary of Arbel Industrie. Recession in the 1980s caused restructuring and in 1985 the operations were merged with Fauvet Girel to form Arbel Fauvet Rail.

=== Fauvet Girel ===
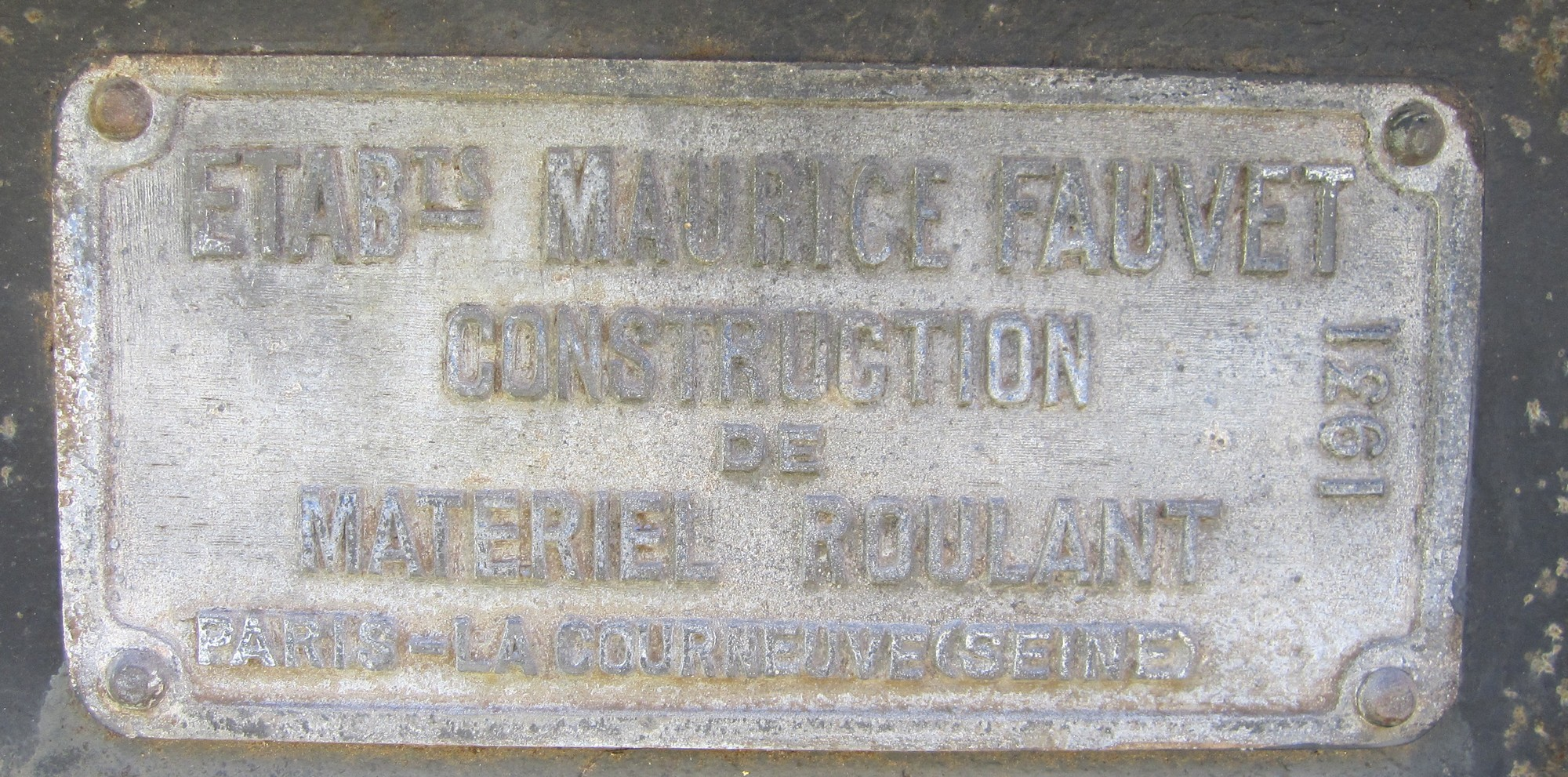
builder's plate of a 1931 tank wagon

In 1907 the Établissements Girel works was founded in Paris, and in 1914 Edouard Fauvet established a factory in La Courneuve (Paris).

In 1923 Girel transferred its factory from Paris to Saint-Laurent-Blangy. After the death of his father Edouard Fauvet in 1931, Maurice-Fauvet took over the control of the company. In 1935 he refocused the business to specialise in the construction of tank wagons and special wagons. At its peak the Fauvet-Girel company employed around 1000 workers. The company merged with Arbel in 1985, a result of which was restructuring which saw the closure of the Saint-Laurent-Blangy factory in 1990.

=== Arbel Fauvet ===
Arbel Fauvet Rail was formed in 1985 by the merger of Fauvet Girel and the Douai wagon plant subsidiary of Arbel Industrie.

In June 2007 the company was taken over by IGF Industries and renamed IGF Industries - Arbel Fauvet Rail.

The company went into receivership in February 2009 and in 2010 the company was acquired by Titagarah Wagons Limited (India) for €2 million, with a proposed investment of €13 million.

Main production is located on industrial site of 25 hectares, including 52,000 m^{2} covered facilities.

== Products ==
The company manufactures freight rolling stock including tank, hopper and car carrier wagons; in 2010 it had a production capacity of ~5000 wagons per year.

=== Past products ===
The company's production included the Y8000 and Y8400 type shunters built for the SNCF during the 1980s and early 1990s, as well as FIA, FSA, FTA, IKA, IFA intermodal ISO Container wagons, and JGA hoppers; built for UK railways in the 1990s. The company also supplied many intermodal wagons to the SNCF and Intercontainer.
