= Painted Canyon (Purgatoire River) =

Coordinates: 37.29°N 103.92°W

Painted Canyon is a canyon area located east of Trinidad, Colorado, along the Purgatoire River in southeastern Colorado. The site is known for a series of large-scale paintings created on the canyon walls by artist Martin Bowden during the early to mid-20th century.

Regional newspaper coverage from the 1960s and early 1970s described the location as a "gallery" or "outdoor gallery" of paintings situated along the canyon walls.

== Description ==
The Painted Canyon site consists of multiple rock faces bearing painted figures, including animals and western-themed imagery. Contemporary accounts described the works as large-scale or life-size paintings positioned along steep canyon walls.

Some reports indicated that dozens of paintings were present and distributed across different sections of the canyon.

Access to the site has historically been limited due to its remote location and terrain. Newspaper descriptions noted that reaching certain paintings required navigating narrow paths or climbing along canyon walls.

== History and coverage ==
A 1965 article in the La Junta Tribune-Democrat described the canyon as containing a "gallery"” of paintings along the Purgatoire canyon walls.

A 1966 feature in The Denver Post referred to the site as an "outdoor gallery" and documented the paintings along canyon walls near Trinidad, Colorado.

A 1967 article in the Security Advertiser & Fountain Valley News described the canyon as bearing “the mark of artistry,” and reported that numerous life-size paintings were visible on rock faces east of Trinidad.

A 1970 article in The Pueblo Chieftain reported that at least forty-two paintings existed in three separate “galleries” within the canyon and noted that visitors to the area sometimes left with sketches created by Bowden.

By 1972, coverage in the Colorado Springs Gazette Telegraph raised questions about the long-term preservation of the artwork and documented continued public awareness of the site.

== See also ==
- Martin Bowden
- Purgatoire River
