= Émile Jaboulay =

French chemist (1879–1961)

- Born: 14 February 1879; Rive-de-Gier, Loire, France
- Died: 28 January 1961 (aged 81); Saint-Étienne, Lloire, France
- Occupation: Chemist
- Known for: High-carbon steel

Émile Jaboulay (14 February 1879 – 28 January 1961) was a French chemist and metallurgist.

Émile Jaboulay was born in Rive-de-Gier on 14 February 1879, son of an engineer. His higher education led to his becoming a chemist. He became a chemical engineer at the marine steel works in Lorette, and then set up and directed the first laboratory for the Société d'Electro-Chimie, d'Electro-Métallurgie et des Aciéries Electriques d'Ugine (SECEMAEU), a factory founded by the industrialist Paul Girod and better known by the name of Ugitech. In 1909 he founded his own company, the Jaboulay steelworks at Terrenoire (now part of Saint-Étienne). He directed this company until 1947.

Émile Jaboulay specialized in research into alloys, and conducted more than 10,000 tests between 1910 and 1923. Based on these results his business in Terrenoire produced and marketed high-carbon steel that had great value in high-speed steel tools. High-carbon steel was requisitioned during World War II to make German tanks and airplanes.

Jaboulay was made a knight of the Legion of Honor in 1959. Émile Jaboulay died in Saint-Étienne on 28 January 1961. A street in Saint-Étienne is named after him.
