= Rive-de-Gier =

- Commune
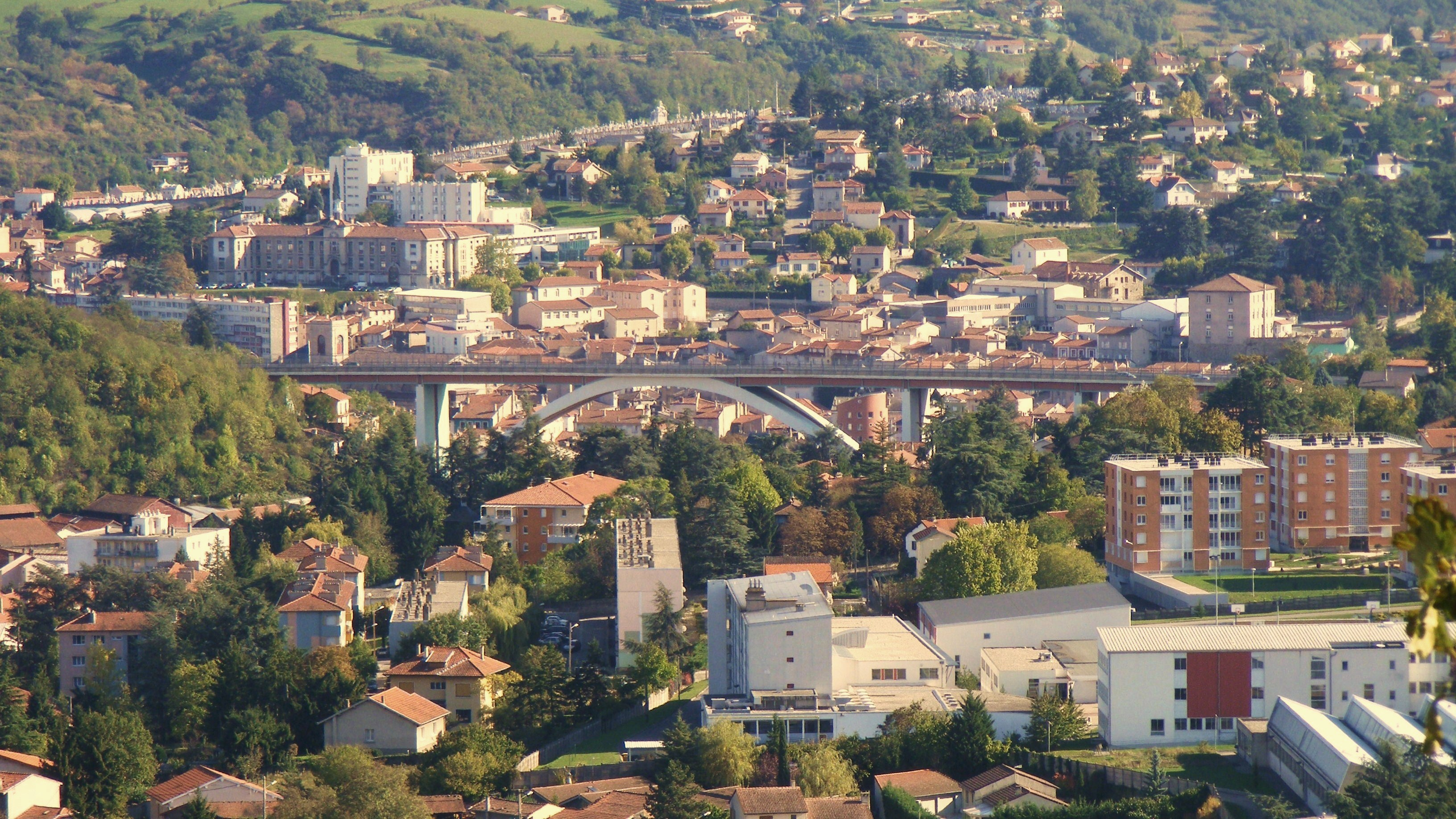
- View from the northwest

- Coat of arms
- Location of Rive-de-Gier
- Location within France Location within Auvergne-Rhône-Alpes
- Coordinates: 45°31′49″N 4°37′04″E
- Country: France
- Region: Auvergne-Rhône-Alpes
- Department: Loire
- Arrondissement: Saint-Étienne
- Canton: Rive-de-Gier
- Intercommunality: Saint-Étienne Métropole

Government
  - Mayor (2020–2026): Vincent Bony
- Area^{1}: 7.33 km^{2} (2.83 sq mi)
- Elevation: 260 m (850 ft)
- Highest elevation: 394 m (1,293 ft)
- Lowest elevation: 227 m (745 ft)
- Population (2023): 15,242
  - Density: 2,080/km^{2} (5,390/sq mi)
- Time zone: UTC+01:00 (CET)
  - Summer (DST): UTC+02:00 (CEST)
- INSEE/Postal code: 42186 /42800
- ^{1} French Land Register data, which excludes lakes, ponds, glaciers > 1 km^{2} (0.386 sq mi or 247 acres) and river estuaries.

Rive-de-Gier (French pronunciation: [ʁiv də ʒje], literally Bank of Gier; Arpitan: Vâr-de-Giér) is a commune in the Loire department in central France.

In 2023, with a population of 15,242 inhabitants and an area of 7.33 km^{2}, the population density is 2,080 inhabitants per km^{2}

It was an important center of Loire coal mining basin, glass making and iron and steel manufacture in the 19th century. In the late 20th century the town lost most of its heavy industries.

== Location ==
Rive de Gier is Located in the Loire department, on the border of the Rhône department, 25 km from Saint-Étienne, 38 km from Lyon and 11 km from the town of Saint Chamond.

The altitude of the city varies from 227 to 394 meters. The municipal territory is located above the Loire coal basin.

== Economy ==
The median income of the municipality is 18,780 euros

The poverty rate in 2020 is 23%.

In 2020, the unemployment rate in the municipality was 18.4% of the active population. Among young people aged 15 to 24, the unemployment rate is 35.4%. Among those with a job, 84.6% are employees.

== History ==
=== Early years ===
In the Celtic and Roman Gaul eras, the town lay on the boundary between the Segusiavi and the Allobroges.

The name of Rive-de-Gier is used for the first time in the 11th century. Renaud de Forez surrounded the town by walls and ditches during the reign of Philip II of France (1165–1223) . A hospital is mentioned in 1447. At the end of the 16th century the population was estimated at between 1,600 and 1,700 souls.

Between 1562 and 1864 there were clashes between Protestants and Catholics. King Henry IV of France (1553 - 1610) spent time at Rive-de-Gier. There was a castle and a Romanesque church, but both have been destroyed. During the uprising in Lyon against the National Convention in 1793, thirteen armed people of Lyon were killed by the inhabitants of Rive-de-Gier when they returned through the town after being defeated at Saint-Étienne.

In 1831 a riot of gunsmiths in Saint-Étienne injured several and led to the arrest of 18 people, The same year the miners of Rive-de-Gier, and then the glass makers, went on strike. The miners went on strike again in 1840 and 1844. In 1848 Jean-Marie Sigward, a glass maker, acclaimed the Republic.

=== Industrial era ===
==== Transport ====
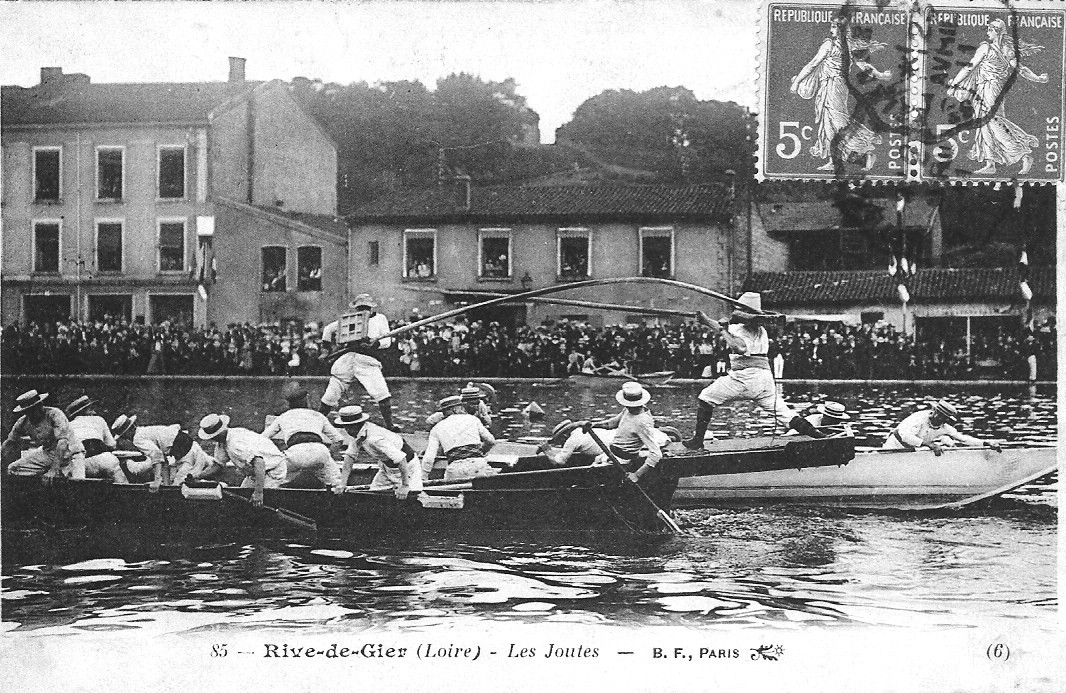
Games on the canal basin

Since the Gier is not navigable, a canal to Givors was opened in 1779 to transport coal. This canal, of which only a few remnants have survived, was replaced by the Saint-Étienne–Lyon railway, first passenger railway in France, built in 1828–33. Rive-de-Gier houses what was probably the first railway tunnel made in France.

==== Coal mining ====
In 1837, different mining companies in Rive-de-Gier joined forces to create the Compagnie Générale des Mines de Rive-de-Gier to buy the pumps needed for drainage of the underground works. When this company saw its coal reserves were exhausted, it set up in Saint-Étienne in 1840. It was the Compagnie Générale des Mines de la Loire before being absorbed by the powerful Compagnie des Mines de la Loire.

==== Glassware ====
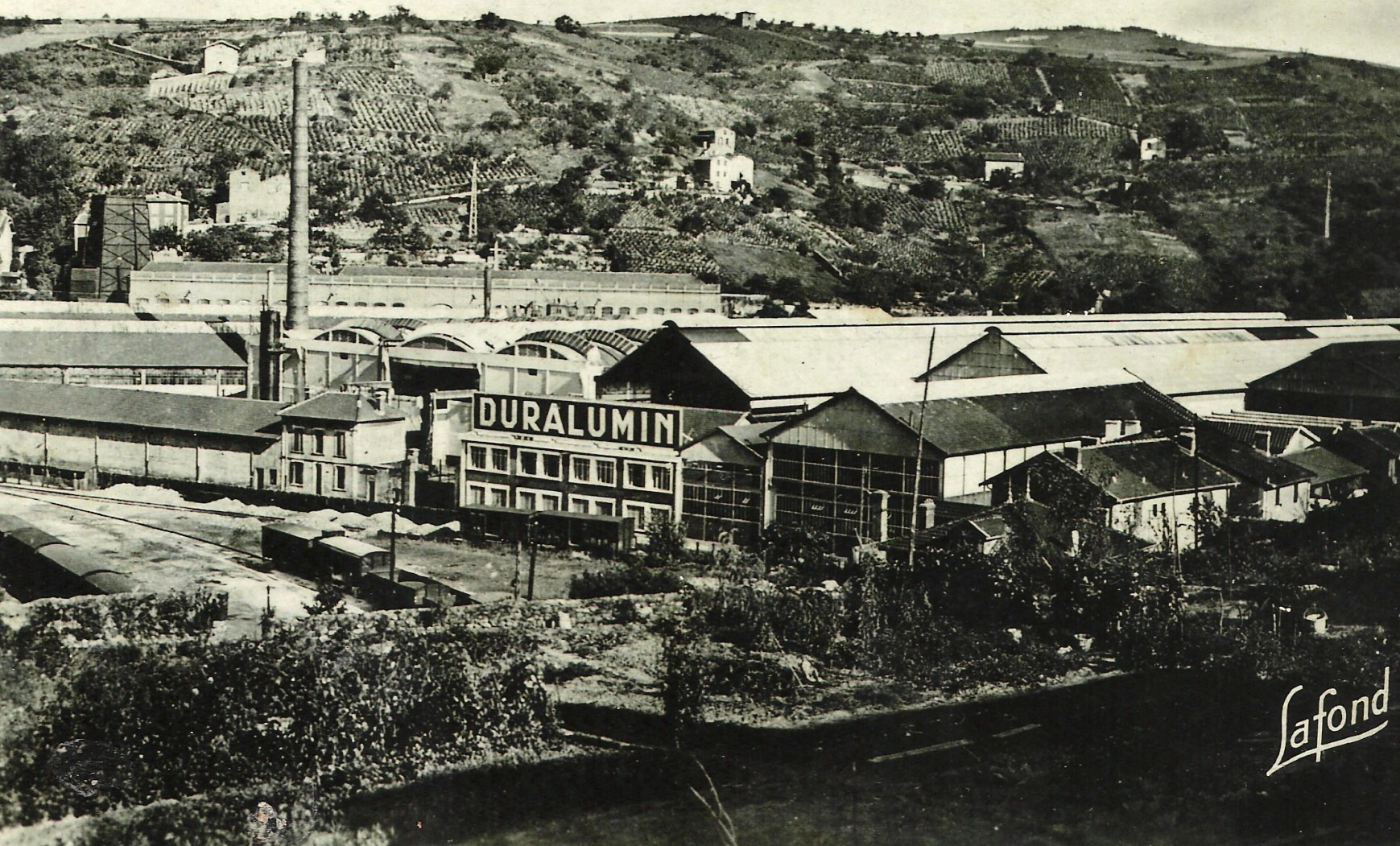
Duralumin factory

For many years glass production was located near the forests that provided the charcoal needed for combustion. In the 18th century glass works were moved closer to coal mines. In 1749 the glass maker Robichon from Franche-Comté moved to Givors where it used sand from the Rhone as material and coal from Rive-de-Gier as fuel. In 1788 there were two glass factories in Rive-de-Gier making bottles and glasses. At the beginning of the 19th century the Robichon company moved to Rive-de-Gier by buying other glass works, and introduced the production of flat glass.

By 1830 the thirty glass works in the city employed about 1,200 people. The Richarme glass works founded in 1826 in the Egarande neighborhood specialized in the manufacture of bottles. In 1877 Petrus Richarme rebuilt the factory with an area of 7,500 square metres (81,000 sq ft) and introduced into France the gas and continuous melting furnaces of Siemens. The company operated until 1958 before being demolished. The last glass factory, located in the district of Couzon, Duralex, ceased operations in 2006. It had been founded in 1906 by Emile Hémain before merging with Souchon-Neuvesel in 1958 to join the Boussois-Souchon-Neuvesel (BSN) group in 1966.

==== Metallurgy ====
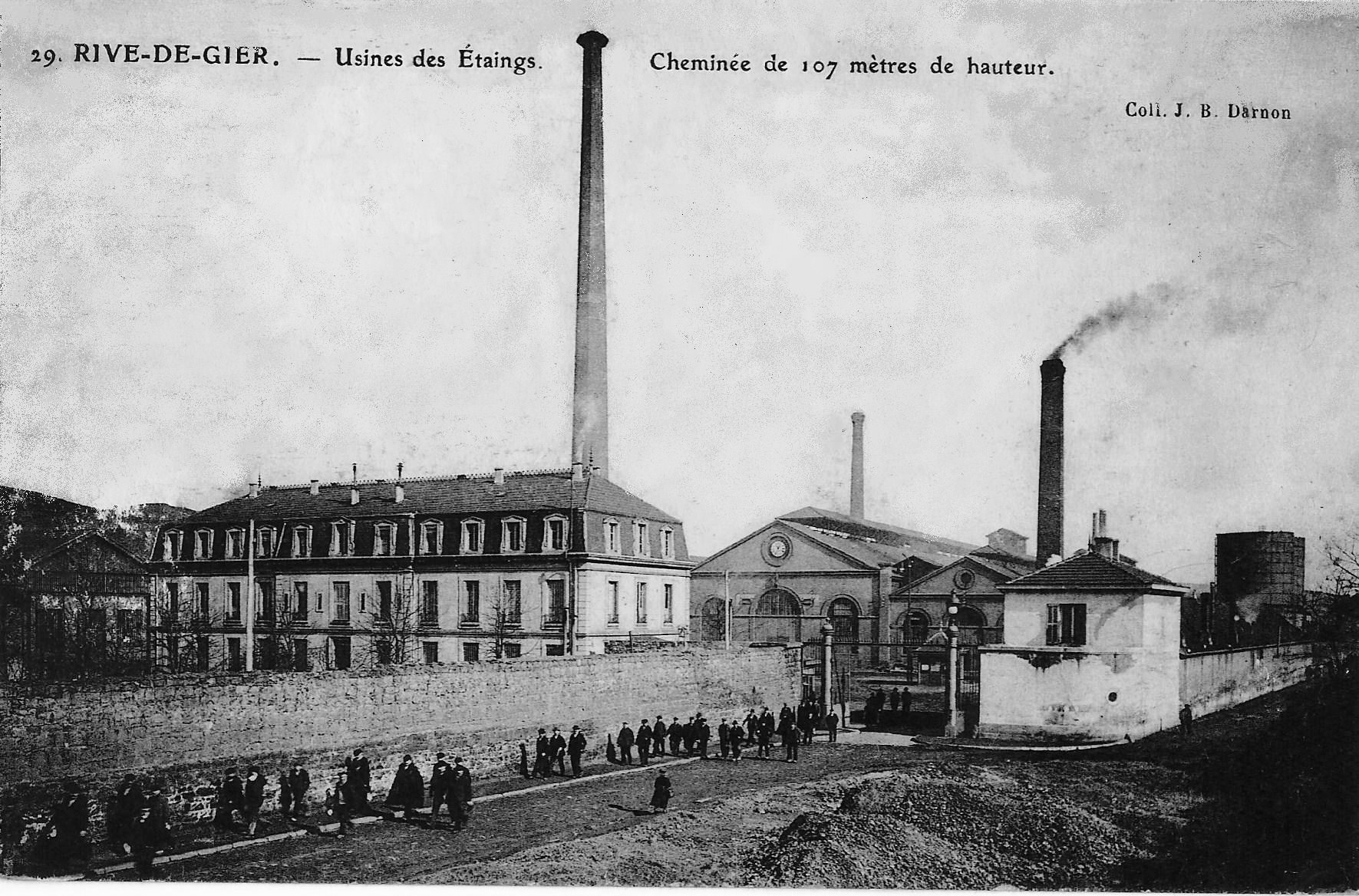
Marrel frères Etaings factory in Châteauneuf

In 1837 H. Pétin and J. M. Gaudet, mechanics and forgers, set up shops at Saint-Chamond and Rive-de-Gier. On 14 November 1854 Pétin et Gaudet merged and combined with four other companies to create the Compagnie des Hauts-fourneaux, forges et aciéries de la Marine et des chemins de fer. The company, which engaged in extracting, processing and selling iron and coal was initially based in Rive-de-Gier. On 9 November 1871 it moved its headquarters to Saint-Chamond and became a limited company.

The forges of Petin-Gaudet, Lucien Arbel, Marrel and others were the real economic engines of the city. As a symbol of this time, the chimney of the old Marrel Forges on the site of Châteauneuf, Loire, built in 1866 and one of the highest in Europe at 108 metres (354 ft), was classified a historical monument in 1992.

=== Recent years ===
Rive-de-Gier has suffered the brunt of the massive disindustrialization of the 1980s and 1990s, with the massive loss of industrial jobs, the closure of the SSFR, and the July 2008 closure of the last operating glassworks in the Gier valley.

== Population ==
Historical population

Year	Pop.	±% p.a.
1793	3,226	—
1806	5,300	+3.89%
1821	6,456	+1.32%
1831	9,706	+4.16%
1841	11,543	+1.75%
1851	13,186	+1.34%
1861	14,202	+0.75%
1872	13,946	−0.17%
1881	16,816	+2.10%
1891	13,134	−2.44%
1901	16,087	+2.05%
1911	15,663	−0.27%
1921	15,336	−0.21%

Year	Pop.	±% p.a.
1931	14,707	−0.42%
1946	13,931	−0.36%
1954	15,118	+1.03%
1962	16,565	+1.15%
1968	16,855	+0.29%
1975	17,706	+0.71%
1982	15,806	−1.61%
1990	15,623	−0.15%
1999	14,383	−0.91%
2007	14,519	+0.12%
2012	14,633	+0.16%
2017	15,184	+0.74%
2023	15,242	+0.06%

Source: EHESS and INSEE

== Economy ==
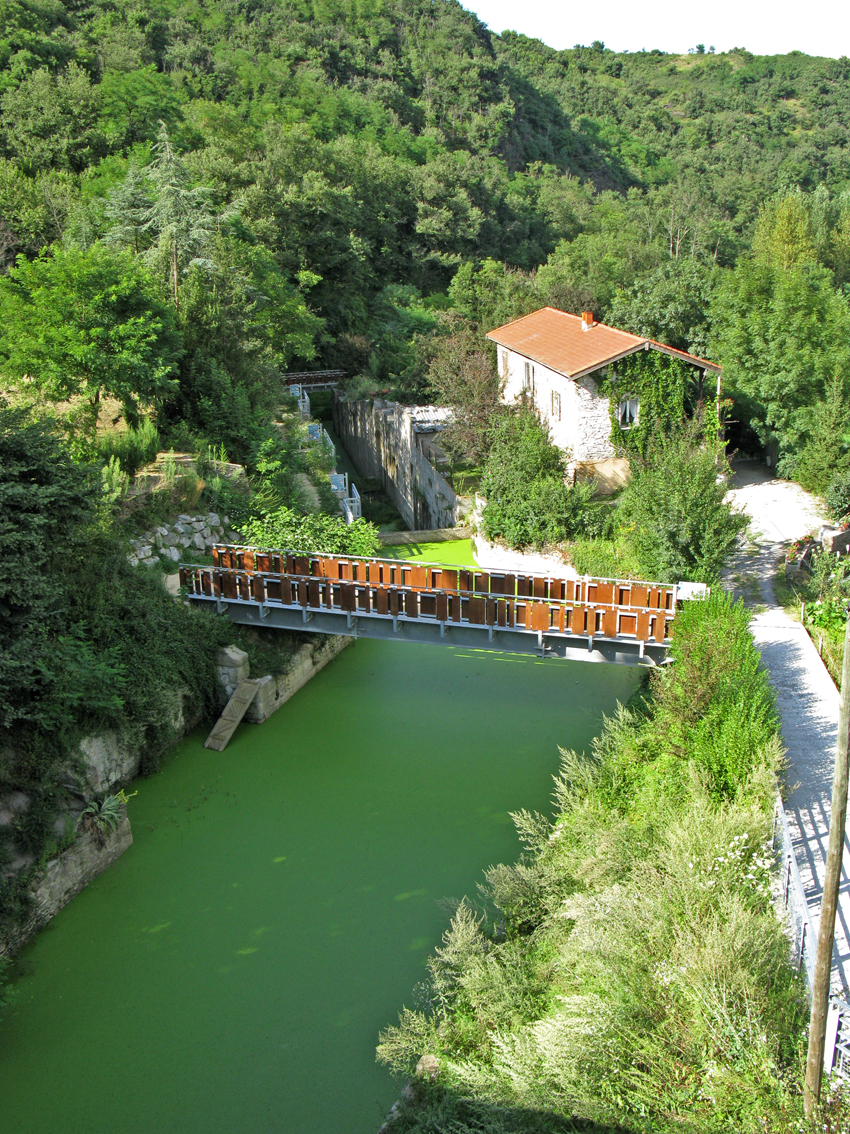
Double lock on the Givors canal at Tartaras, just downstream from Rive-de-Gier

A significant number of inhabitants work in other communities such as Lyon.

Every Tuesday and Friday morning a large market is open in the main square, the Place de la Liberation. The market attracts nearly 200 merchants, making it second largest market in the Loire department, both in terms of diversity and quality. It is also the largest market in the department to require that market traders remove all their waste at the end of each market Every Saturday morning a market of farmers and artisans takes place on the same site, in the Canal Street extension.

== Sports ==
Sports clubs are organized in associations. The BCR - Basket Club de Rive de Gier is a men's basketball team. The Gier Country Rugby Club has a men's and a women's rugby team that participates in the Federal Championship of Women's Rugby. The Athletic Club Rive de Gier is a football club.

== Culture ==
=== Socio-Cultural facilities ===
- The Chaplin cinema in rue Jules Guesde has a room for art and holds monthly "thematic meetings", combining information and public debate.
- The Mediatheque Louis Aragon, near the old canal basin, was partly destroyed during the flood of 2 November 2008.
- L'Imprimerie (The Print shop) is a dinner theater in a former printing workshop.
- The Armand Lanoux and Henri Matisse social centres
- Theatre Couzon
- Theater Jean Dasté
- The Vincent d'Indy music school, classified a municipal conservatory, was created in 1969.

=== Cultural events ===
- The jazz festival "RHINO JAZZ" ran for 30 years in Rive de Gier. Subsequent editions, starting in 2009, were held in Saint-Chamond
- The cartoon festival "BD'ART" held its 10th edition in December 2008
- The Autumn Exhibition of Painting and Sculpture of Ripagerien (Note: "Ripagerien" is the slang name for the people of Rive-de-Gier.) Arts
- The Theatre Festival "The Wandering CO" is held every year for a week in Saint-Chamond, L'Horme and Rive de Gier.

=== Mining heritage ===
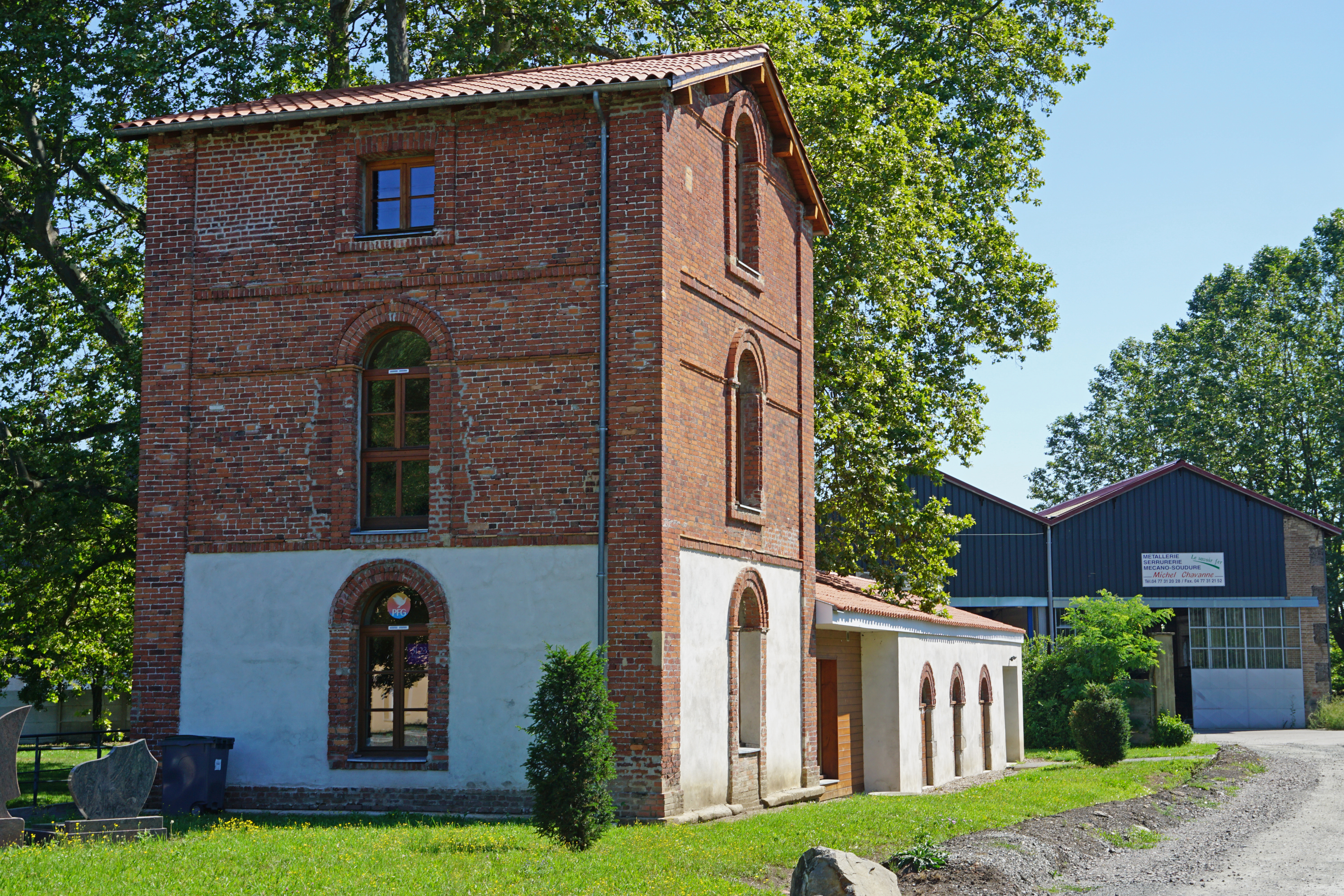
The Gourd-Marin building

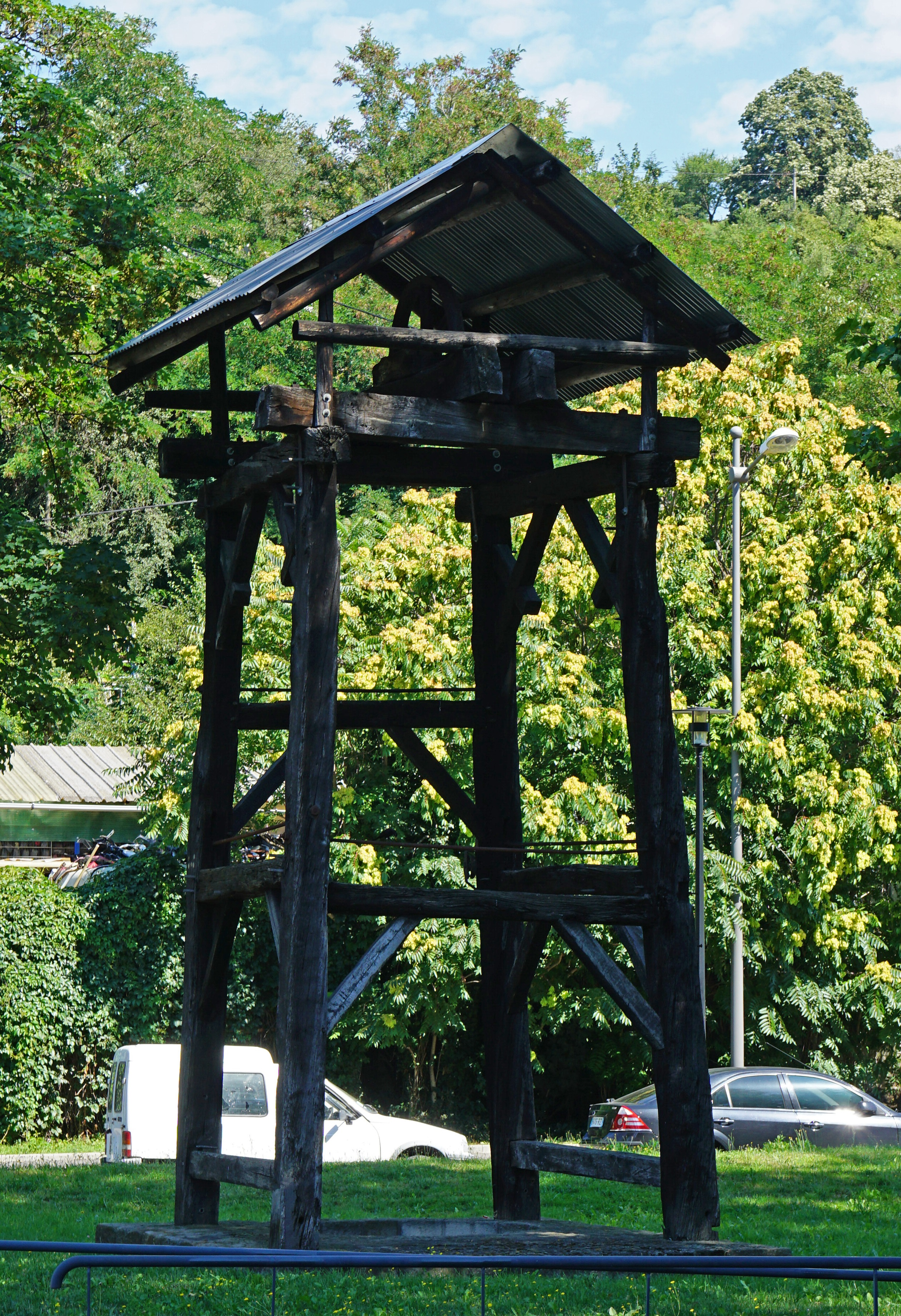
The headframe of the Combélibert mine

- The statue Saint Eligius represents the patron saint of goldsmiths and blacksmiths, and stands at the main entrance of the first plant of the Marrel brothers company.
- The town hall is installed in the old headquarters of the canal company, classified as a historical monument. The canal was to link the Loire and the Rhone, but only the section from Givors to Rive-de-Gier was completed.
- The old Couzon tunnel was drilled during construction of the Saint-Étienne–Lyon railway, and is the first Europe mainland railway tunnel. It was decommissioned in 1858. It is now classified a historical monument.
- The Gourd-Marin site is witness of mining exploitation in the 19th century. The "Warocquère" tower and the old bathhouse building beside it are historical monuments. The mine was opened at the start of the 19th century. Around 1850 the system for workers to descend was modernized using a mechanism housed in the tower. The bathhouse with a hot pool for miners was the first in the Saint Etienne basin.
- The headframe of the Combélibert mine was originally located on rue Michelet but was moved to the Gourd-Marin site and registered as a historical monument. It is probably the only wooden headframe from the 19th century preserved in Europe.

=== Private houses ===
The Château du Mouillon has a central part that corresponds to the original house and dates back to the 18th century. The complex was acquired in 1850 and developed successively by two families of industrialists. First Lucien Arbel, then in 1894 by Jean-Marie Marrel and his son Henri, who had it improved by Parisian designers and artisans. The building, common, garden and some rooms (entrance hall, staircase, old dining room to the north, large oval salon to the south, woodwork and decor of the old library on the ground floor, wood fireplace first floor) are included in the inventory of historical monuments.

The house of the Men of Stone (La maison des Hommes de pierre) was built between 1880 and 1883 by Charles and Étienne Marrel near the first plant of the Marrel Brothers company. The main façade is distinguished by its stone balconies decorated with ironwork, carved window lintels and two towering statues of 'men of stone" supporting the balcony of the first floor. To the west is the blacksmith with his leather apron, to the east metallurgy is represented by the tongs. The ground floor is occupied by three interconnecting reception rooms that open onto a hallway decorated with wood paneling decorated in faux marble with a mosaic floor. To the left after the entry there is a small living room decorated with a white fireplace in Louis XV style. The blue ceiling is decorated with trompe l'oeil roses. Two double doors lead to the "Grand Salon" with ornate woodwork and a black fireplace, a painted ceiling with a plaster rosette.

=== Religious buildings ===
The town is in the Catholic diocese of Saint-Étienne, part of the Ecclesiastical Province of Lyon. The parish of St. Mary Magdalene Gier covers ten communes and has fifteen churches. The commune of Rive-de-Gier has two parish churches. The Church of Our Lady of Gier, built in the early 19th century, is registered in the inventory of historical monuments including its interior.

The Evangelical Church of Gier has a place of worship in the city. The Muslim Cultural and Socio-cultural Association has a Muslim prayer room in the Grand-pont neighborhood.

== People associated with the commune ==
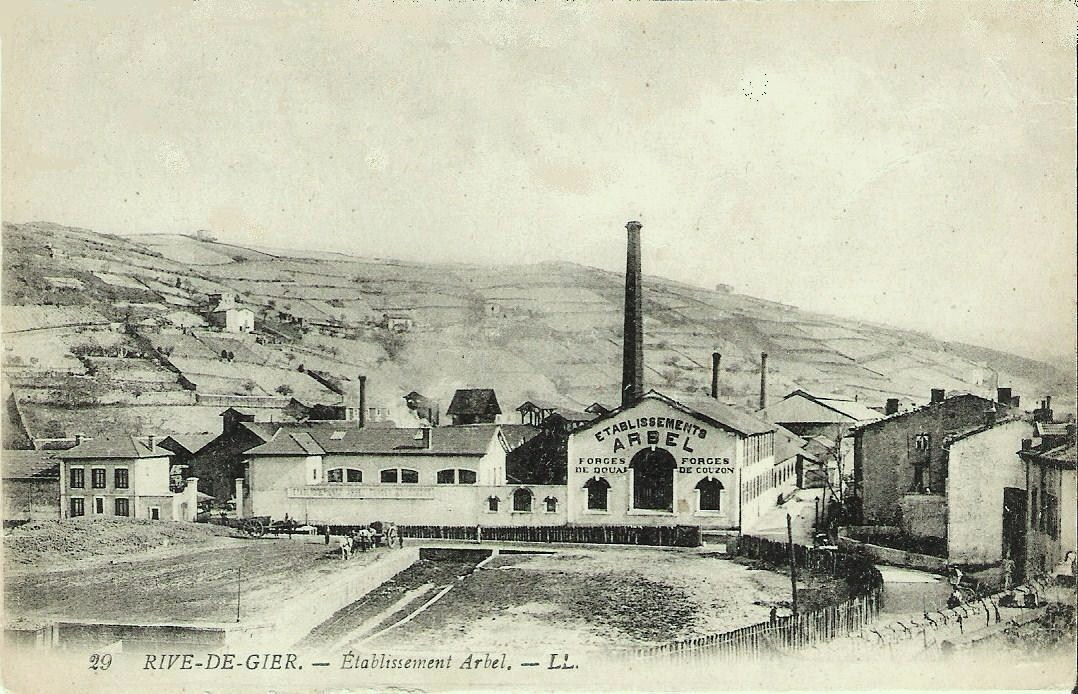
Arbel works

- Lucien Arbel, (1826–1892), industrialist
- Jean-Claude Verpilleux,(1798–1875), industrialist, mayor, deputy
- Guillaume Roquille, (1804–1860), Poet, author of works in the Franco-Provençal language
- Adolphe Lalauze (1838–1906), engraver
- Jean-Baptiste Berlier (1841–1911), engineer, born in Rive-de-Gier, creator of the "pneumatique" for telegram cards in Paris, and of one of the precursors of the Parisian metro.
- Marie Bonnevial (1841–1918), teacher and activist of the League of Women's Rights
- Émile Jaboulay (1879–1961), chemist, specializing in alloys.
- Sébastien Pérez, (born in 1973), footballer raised in River-de-Gier
- Cyril Dessel (born 1974), professional cyclist
  - Martin Bowden (1884–1958), French-born American outsider artist, born in Rive-de-Gier.

== Gallery ==
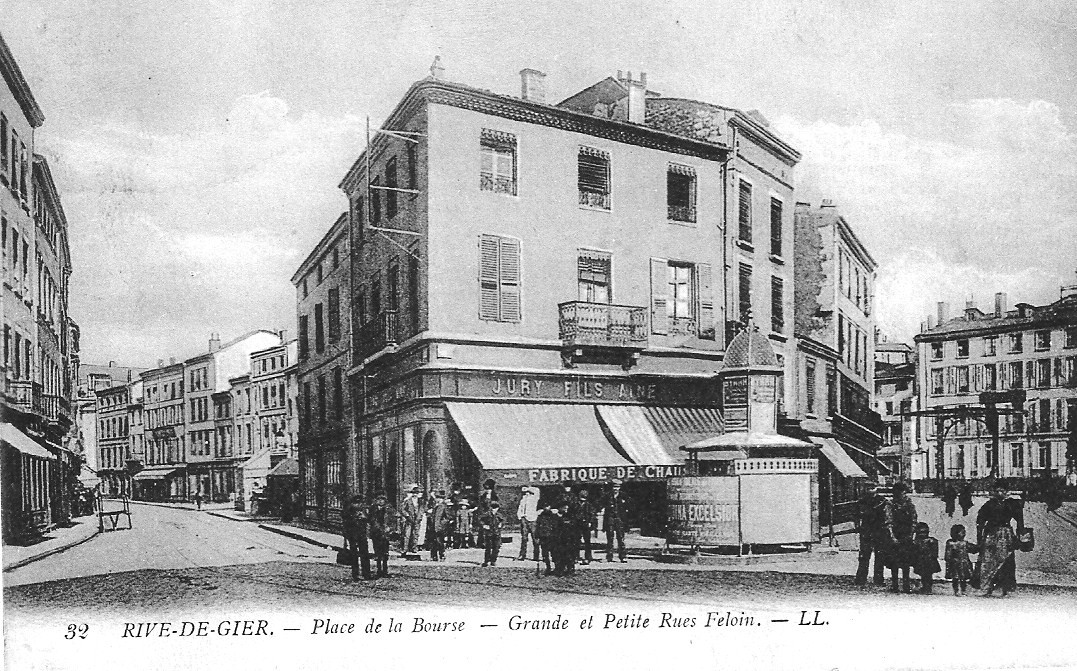
The old exchange building.

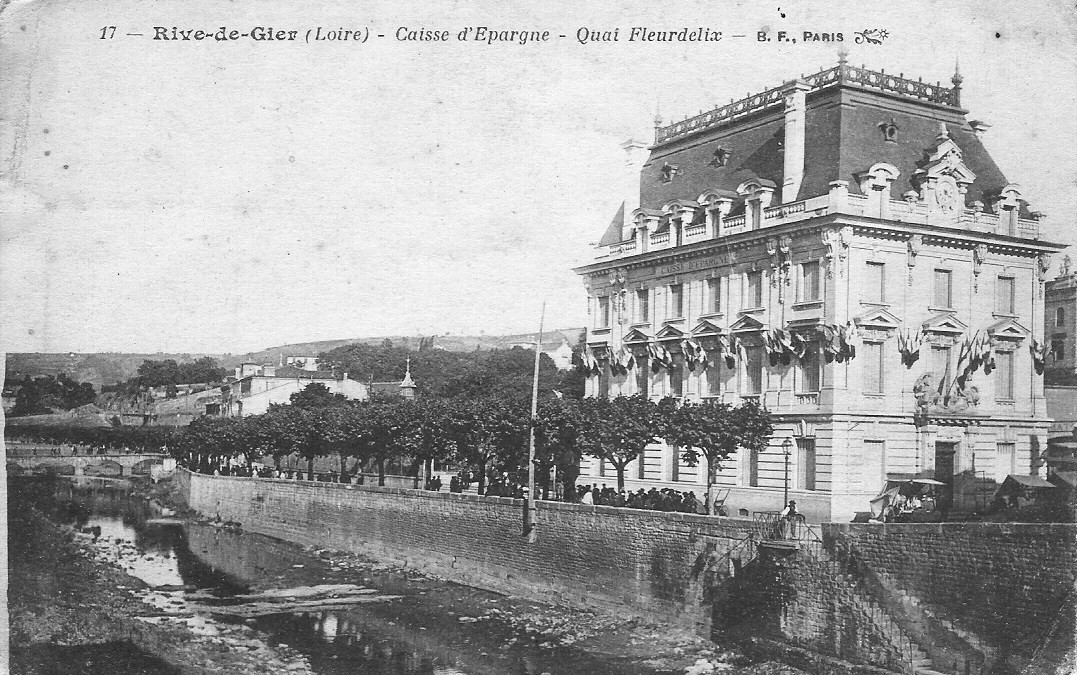
The savings bank installed in 1892 in the old town hall.

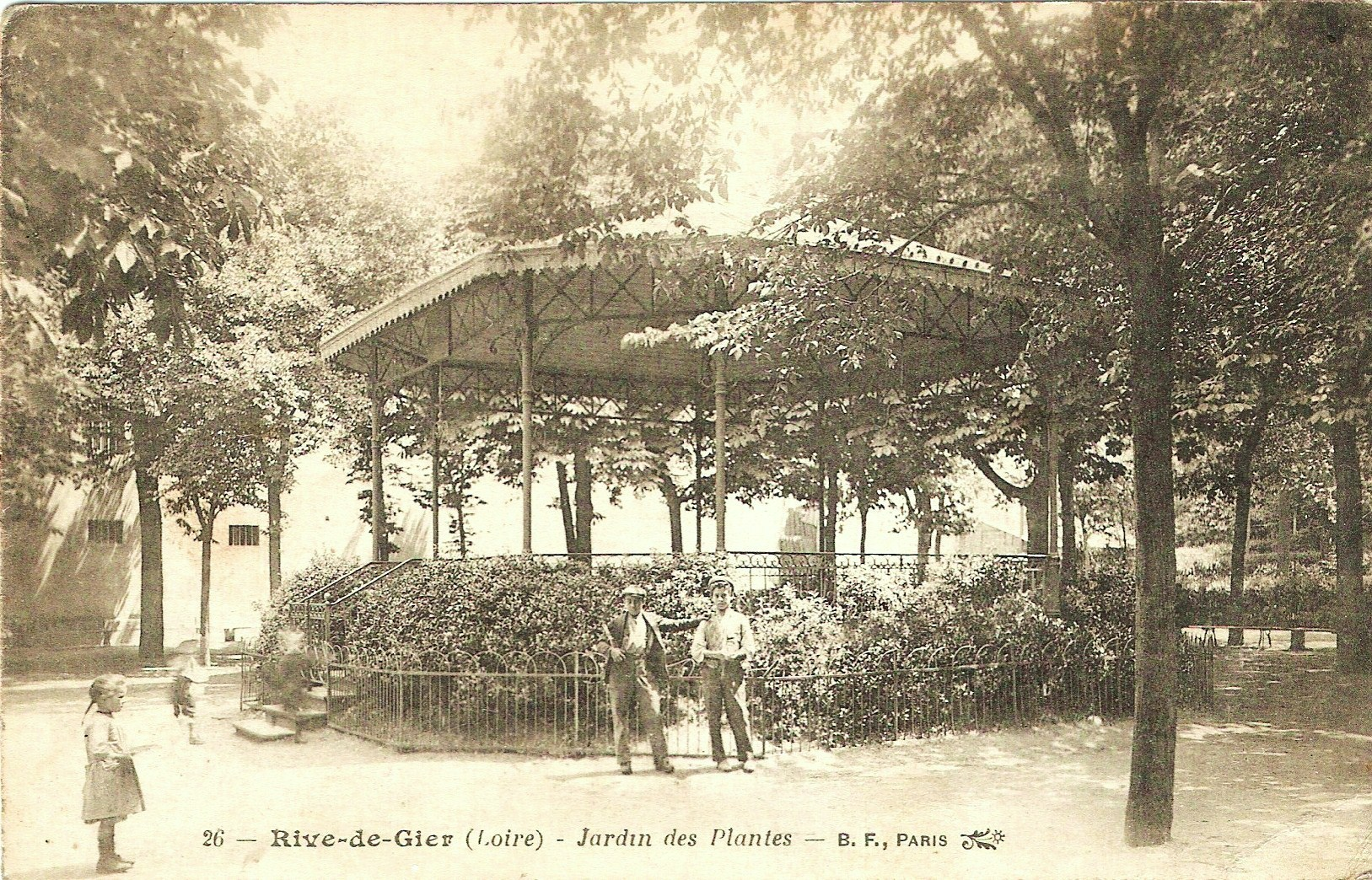
Public park

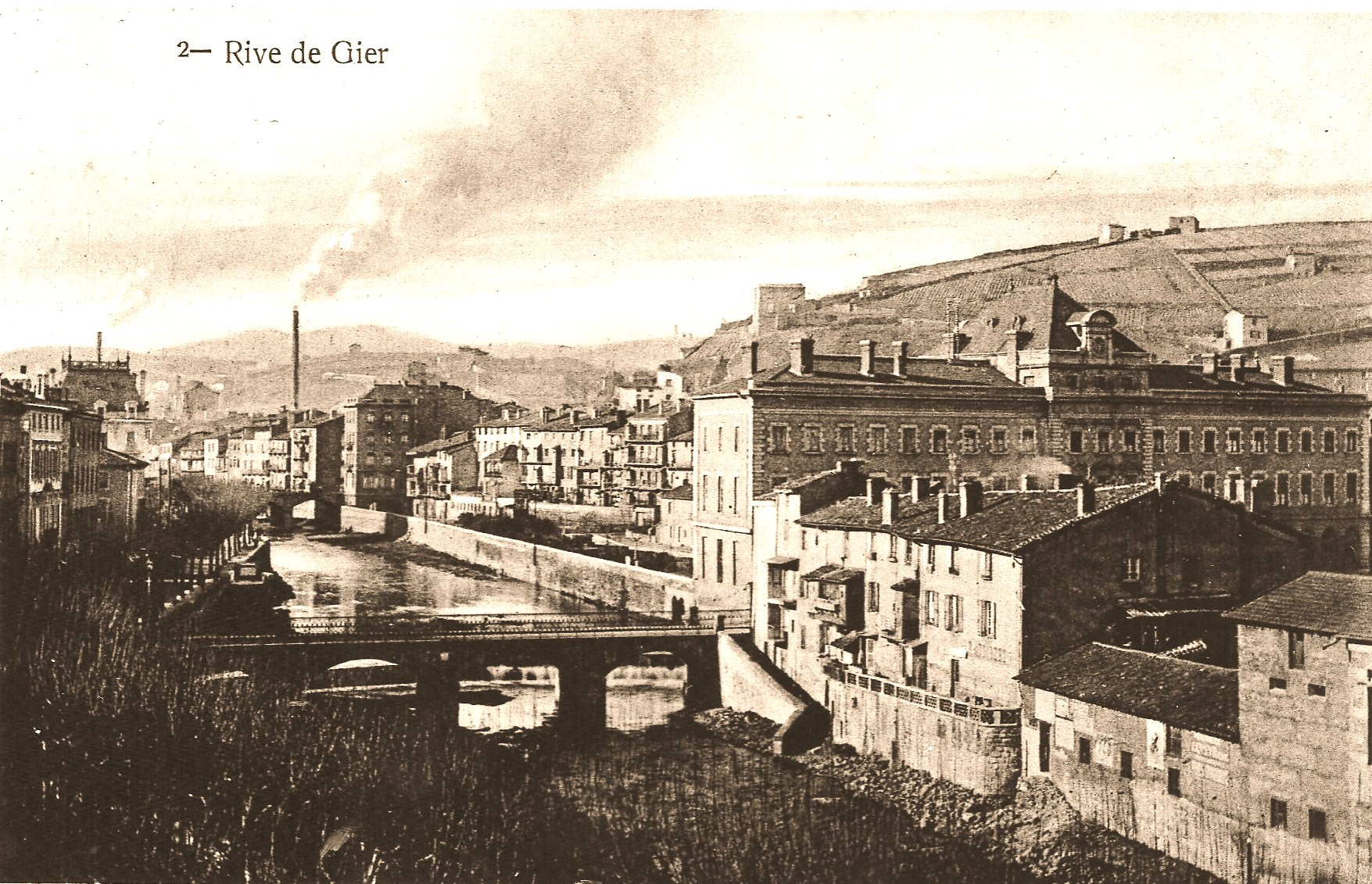
Town hall

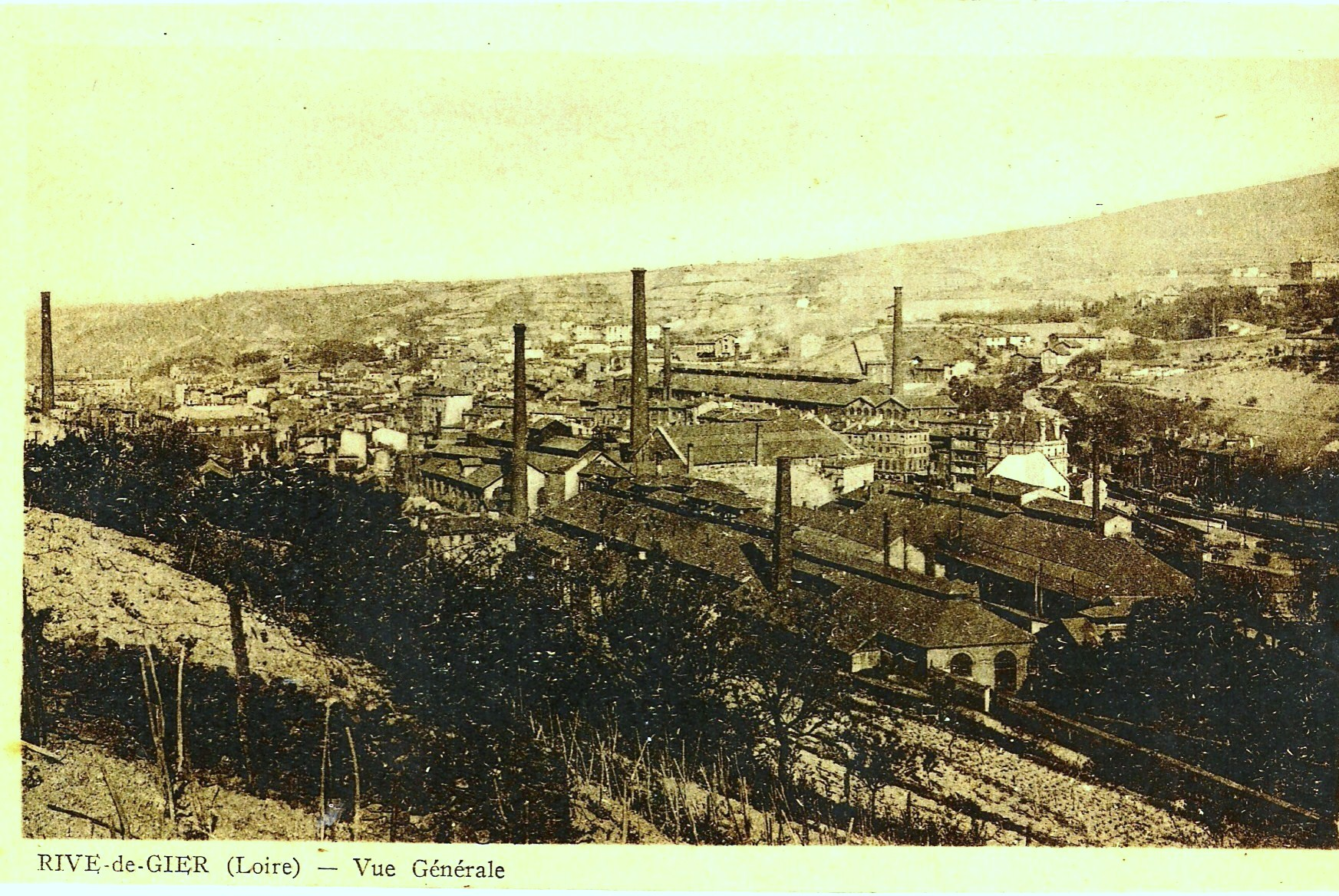
Rive-de-Gier at the start of the 20th century

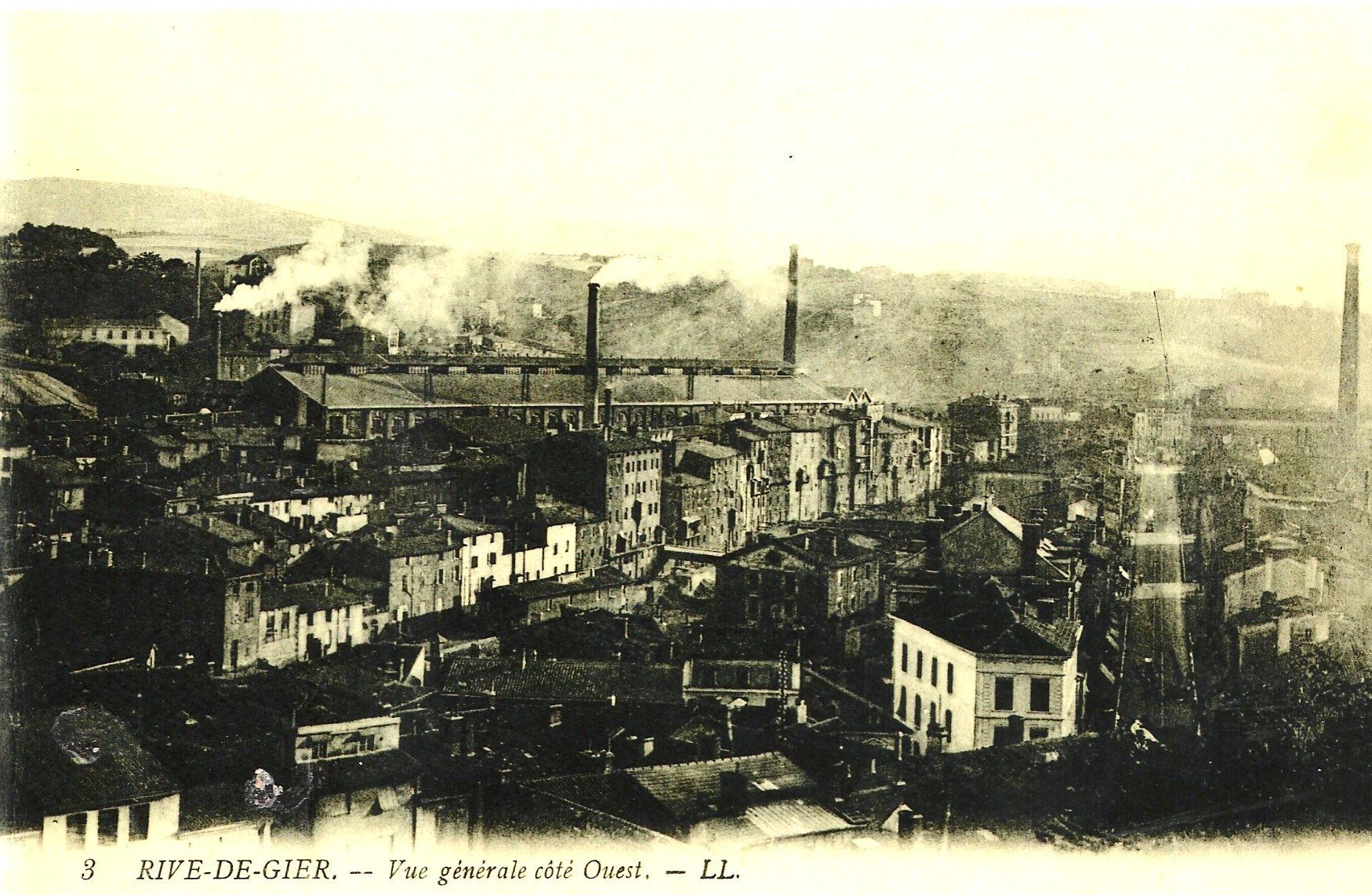
East side of Rive-de-Gier at the start of the 20th century

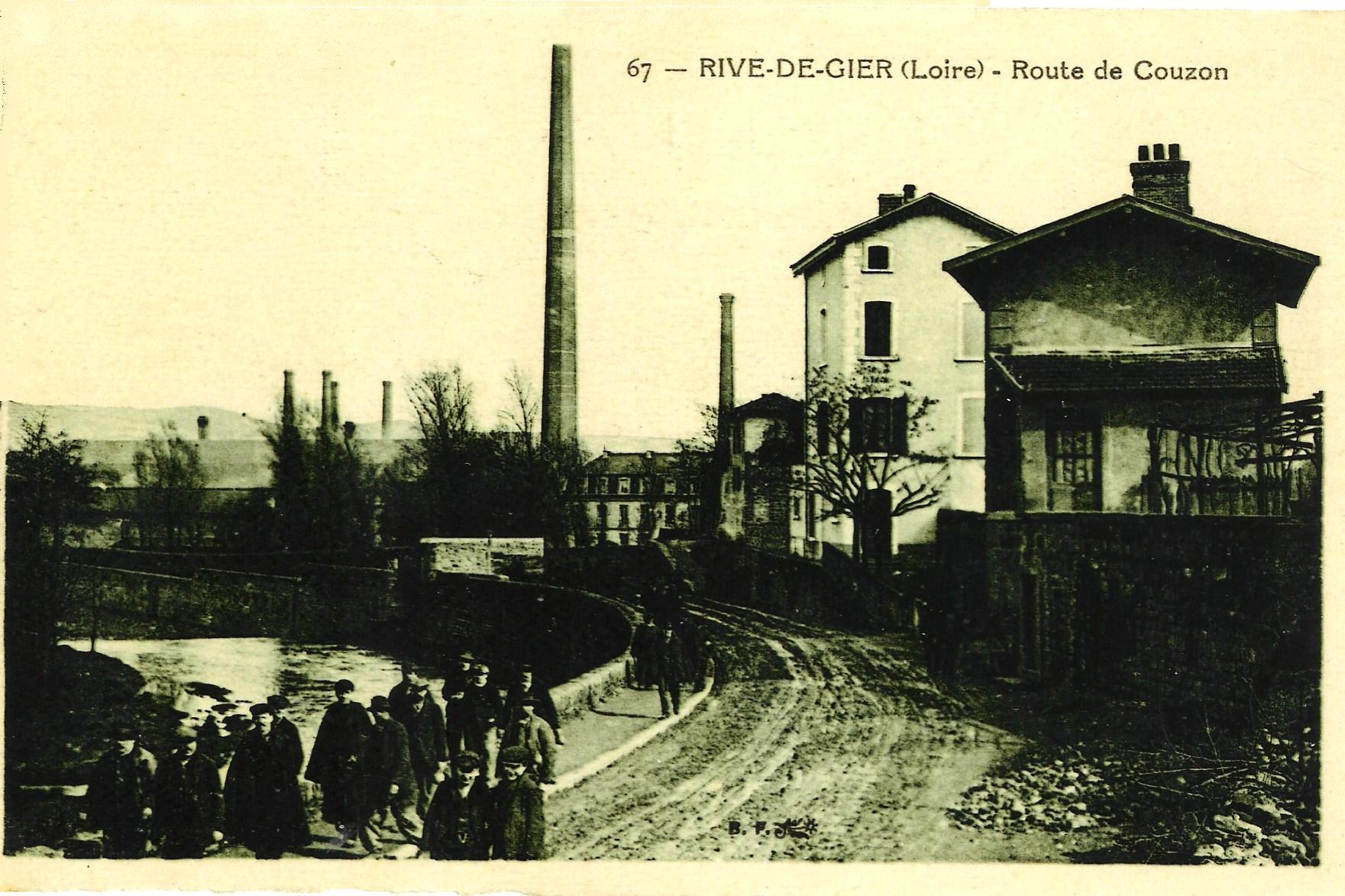
Rive-de-Gier, Couzon road at the start of the 20th century

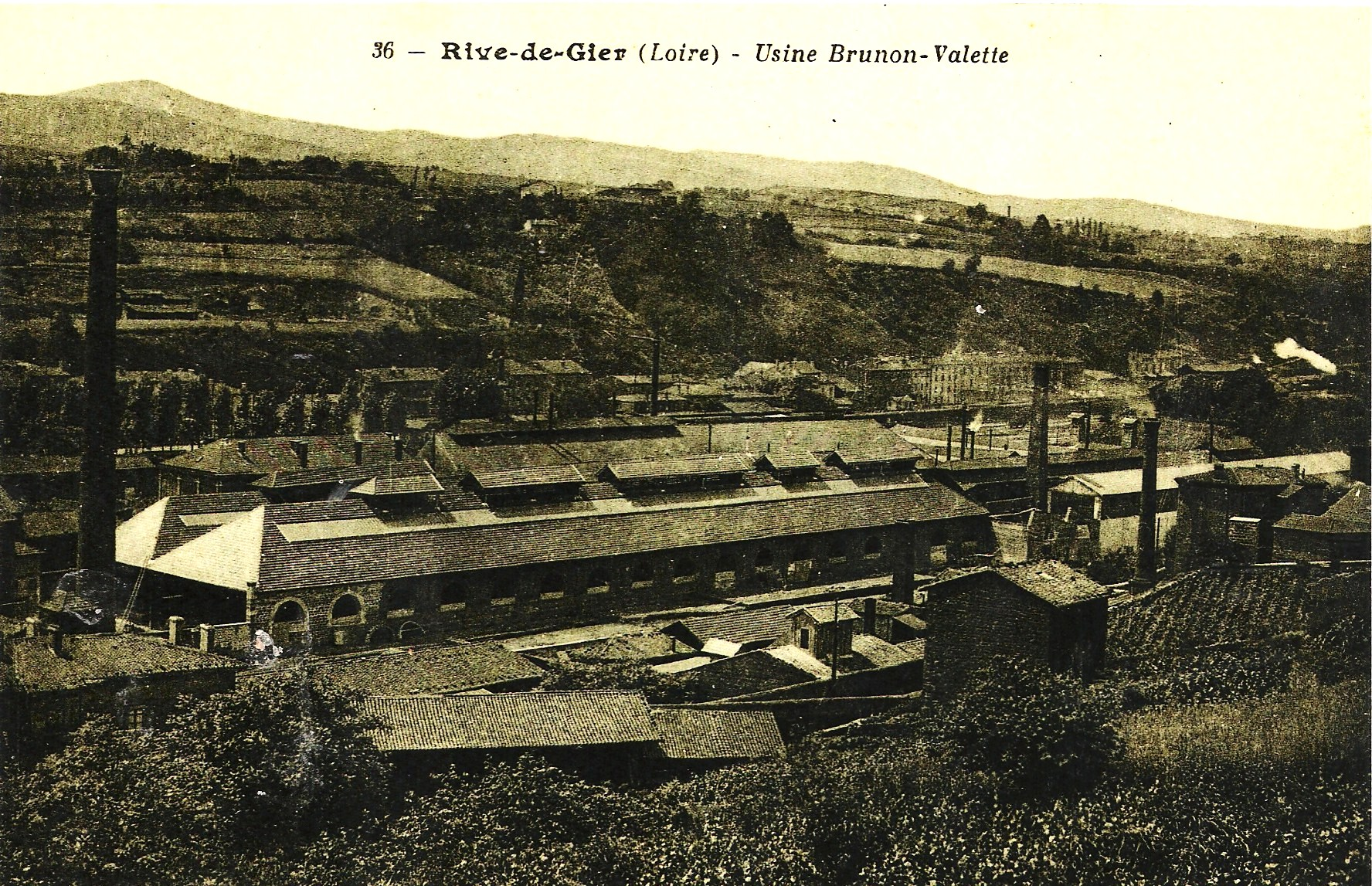
Brunon-Valette factory
