= Claude Verpilleux =

French engineer and inventor (1798–1875)

Jean-Claude Verpilleux
- Born: 2 May 1798; Rive-de-Gier
- Died: 13 October 1875 (aged 77); Saint-Martin-la-Plaine
- Occupations: Engineer, inventor
- Known for: Locomotives, Grapple boats

Jean-Claude Verpilleux (2 May 1798 – 13 October 1875) was a French mine laborer who became a leading engineer, manufacturer and inventor. He was involved in the design of early railway locomotives, and invented innovative steam-powered "grapple boats" driven by traction wheels running along the bed of the river or canal.

== Early years ==
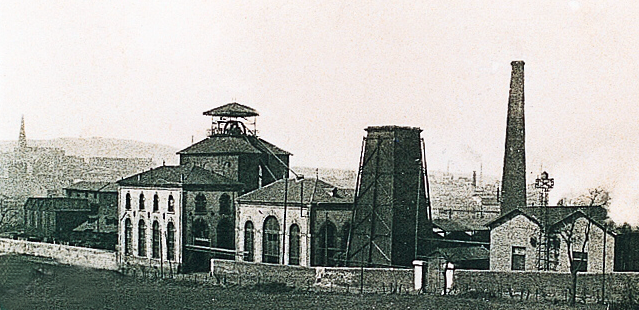
Verpilleux coal mine #1 at Saint-Étienne, later named after the engineer

Claude Verpilleux was born at Rive de Gier in 1798, son of a canal worker. His father died when he was ten. His limited education allowed him to read, calculate, and to write with some difficulty. On 15 August 1810 he began work at a daily salary of one franc at the Montjoint mines in Rive de Gier. One of the mine concessionaires, Fleurdelix, was struck by Verpilleux's activity and intelligence, and had him help install a British steam engine, which was not working satisfactorily. Verpilleux immediately understood how the machine worked, and in 1814 at the age of 16 was placed in charge of it. He examined it carefully and improved it, then built a model of his own which proved satisfactory.

When he was aged twenty-two his employer lent him the money to open a workshop for repairing and improving the English machines that were being used in the mines of the district. He opened his workshop in 1820. From 1825 to 1832 he also worked as an expert mechanic for the Terrenoire company in their workshops in the foundry at La Voulte-sur-Rhône, helping repair or improve their steam engines, while continuing to run his own workshop. From 1832 he devoted all his time to his workshop. He was able to employ his brother and the son of his wife, François Baldeyrou.

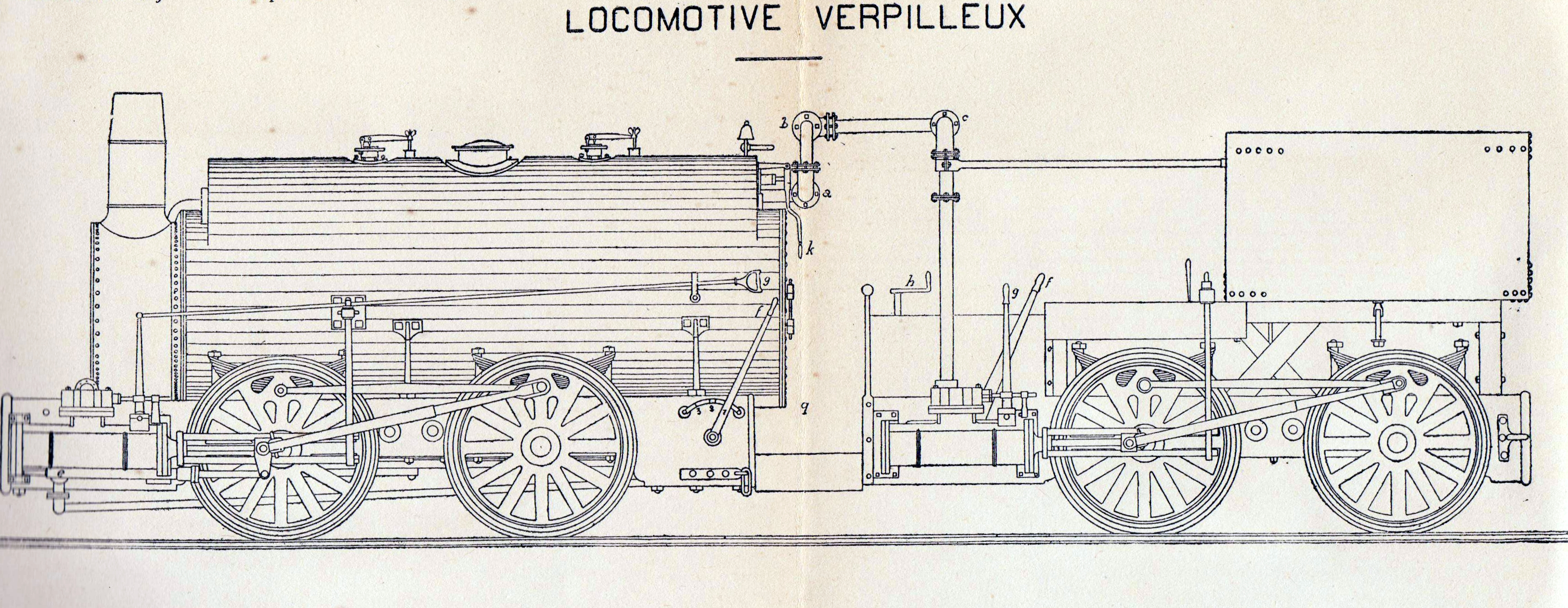
A Verpilleux locomotive with steam-powered tender

The 20 kilometres (12 mi) railway line running west from the coalfield at Saint-Étienne to Andrézieux on the Loire was opened in 1827, the first railway in France. From Andrézieux the coal was shipped north on flat-bottomed barges. In 1832 Verpilleux helped make a second line between Saint-Etienne and Lyon, to the east, on the Rhone. At this time the railway could not carry a locomotive weighing more than 10 tons, and the slope was too steep for any locomotives of the day. Verpilleux built a locomotive with a tender where steam power was applied to the wheels of both locomotive and tender. It could pull a train of up to 40 empty wagons back up the railway. The Séguin company realized substantial savings, and entrusted Verpilleux with the wagons between Rive-de-Gier and Saint-Etienne for the next ten years.

== Inventions ==
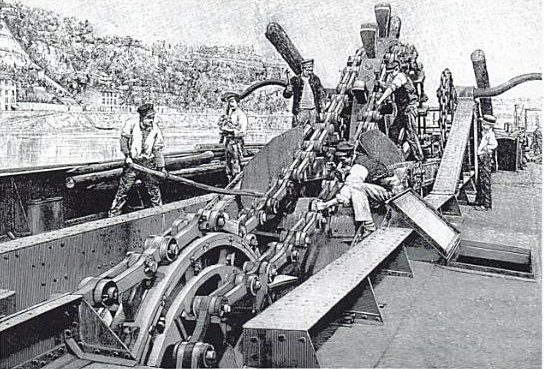
Grappin Verpilleux, showing the drive chains and grapple wheel

On 23 August 1839 Verpilleux Frères (Verpilleux brothers), mechanical engineers at Rive de Gier, filed a patent application, which was approved a week later. It was for a new system of steam boats specially used for the ascent of travelers and merchandise in rivers and canals. A "grapple wheel" 3.9 metres (13 ft) in diameter rolled along the bottom of the canal or river ahead of the boat. It gained traction from teeth set round its circumference. It was attached to the boat by two loops of chain, one on each side, that transmitted power from the boat's steam engine and pulled the boat forward. The boats could travel against a current with much less energy than conventional paddle wheel designs, and could travel through canals that had been invaded by water weeds.

In September 1842 the Verpilleux brothers patented a tender locomotive equipped with two cylinders. Seven of these were in service by 1844. In 1844 the last section of the line from Rive-de-Gier to Saint Etienne was opened using Verpilleux's locomotive tenders, which were more powerful than those of Marc Seguin, totally eliminating horse-drawn railway wagons. Verpilleux began a fertile collaboration with his contemporary, the engineer François Bourdon (1797-1865). By 1848 Verpilleux and Bourdon had put six grappins into service on the Saône.

On 16 February 1851 Verpilleux demonstrated a three-wheeled steam-driven car, which traveled by road between Rive-de-Gier and Saint-Etienne at a speed of up to 16 kilometres per hour (9.9 mph). However, the car frightened the horses and was not a commercial success.

== Other activities ==
During the French Revolution of 1848 both Verpilleux and Bourdon were elected to the constitutional assembly. On the Republican party's list Verpilleux was described as "a man who, from a simple workman, has by his work and his genius raised himself to the rank of the most skilled engineers in the country. It is he who supplied the powerful machines for the railway lines of the Loire and the Rhone." Verpilleux was a member of the Saint-Etienne chamber of commerce from 1853 to 1866. On 10 November 1858 his daughter Elizabeth married Pierre de Montgolfier at Rive-de-Gier. Montgolfier was later to become a Senator.

Jean-Claude Verpilleux was mayor of Rive-de-Gier in 1869 and 1874. He was made a Knight of the Legion of Honor in 1841, and an Officer of the Legion of Honor in 1874. He died on 13 October 1875. The rue Jean-Claude Verpilleux in Saint-Etienne is named after him.
