= Brgule =

- Village (Selo)
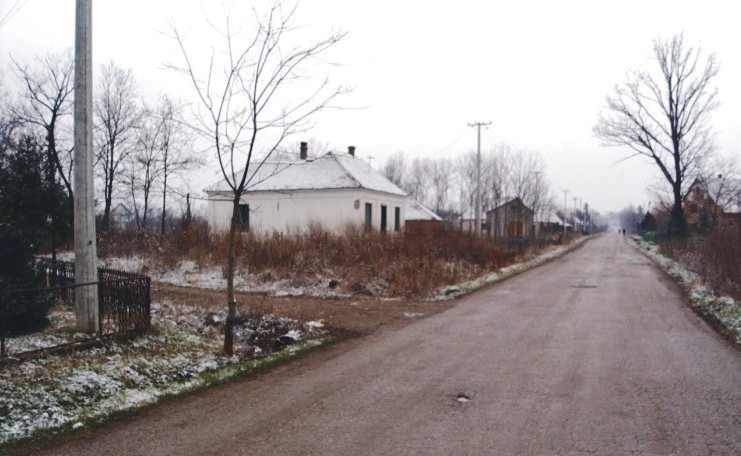
- Brgule

- Location within Serbia
- Country: Serbia
- District: Kolubara District
- Municipality: Ub

Area
  - Total: 15.39 km^{2} (5.94 sq mi)
- Elevation: 83 m (272 ft)

Population (2011)
  - Total: 1,163
  - Density: 75.57/km^{2} (195.7/sq mi)
- Time zone: UTC+1 (CET)
  - Summer (DST): UTC+2 (CEST)

Brgule is a village in the municipality of Ub, Serbia. According to the 2011 census, the village has a population of 1,163 people.
