= Stubline =

Stubline Стублине
- Village
- Location within Serbia
- Coordinates: 44°34′N 20°08′E
- Country: Serbia
- Municipality: Obrenovac

Area
  - Total: 19.69 km^{2} (7.60 sq mi)
- Elevation: 89 m (292 ft)

Population (2011)
  - Total: 3,016
  - Density: 153.2/km^{2} (396.7/sq mi)
- Time zone: UTC+1 (CET)
  - Summer (DST): UTC+2 (CEST)

Stubline (Serbian: Стублине) is a village located in the municipality of Obrenovac, Belgrade, Serbia. As of 2022 census, it has a population of 2,569 inhabitants.

== Crkvine Neolithic site ==
At the Crkvine locality, the remains of a large Neolithic settlement were found. The settlement belonged to the Vinča culture and is estimated that it existed around 4700 BC. Geomagnetic research discovered some 200 houses, though only several objects have been unearthed and explored. Discovered artifacts mostly include large vessels used for keeping liquids and grains, but also mortar and pestle for grinding the grains.
