= Pierre de Montgolfier-Verpilleux =

French politician (1831–1913)

Pierre-Louis-Adrien de Montgolfier-Verpilleux
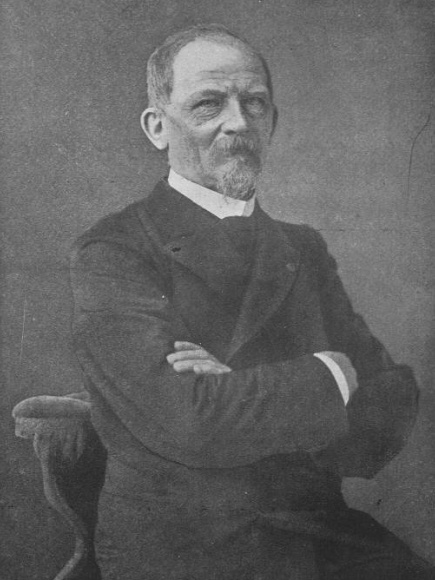
- Pierre de Montgolfier-Verpilleux
- Born: 6 November 1831; Beaujeu, Rhône
- Died: 23 January 1913 (aged 81); Saint-Chamond, Loire
- Occupation: Engineer
- Known for: Saint-Chamond dam

Pierre-Louis-Adrien de Montgolfier-Verpilleux (6 November 1831 – 23 January 1913) was a French engineer who became a representative of the Loire in the National Assembly, and then a senator. He was responsible for various hydraulic works in the Loire department. In the last half of his life he was responsible for a major iron and steel company, making heavy armaments and railway tracks.

== Early years ==
Pierre-Louis-Adrien Montgolfier-Verpilleux was born in Beaujeu, Rhône on 6 November 1831. He was grand-nephew of Jacques-Étienne Montgolfier, the inventor of balloons. He married the daughter of the engineer Claude Verpilleux, adding her name to his. In 1851 he entered the École Polytechnique, and in 1853 the school of roads and bridges. He became a 3rd class engineer in 1856. In 1856 he was appointed engineer to the department of the Loire with responsibility for building flood-control dams in the valleys of the rivers Furens and Gier. On 10 November 1858 he married Elizabeth, daughter of Jean Claude Verpilleux, at Rive-de-Gier. In 1859 he was appointed a 2nd class engineer.

Montgolfier lived at Saint-Étienne from 1861, and became director-general of the Saint Chamond Société des forges. At these two towns he undertook important hydraulic works. He was named a Knight of the Legion of Honor in 1865. On 5 January 1870 he became a 1st class engineer. Montgolfier directed construction of the Saint-Chamond dam, which was inaugurated in 1870. When the Franco-Prussian War broke out in 1870, Montgolfier was named commander of the 3rd mobile battalion of the Loire. In this position he took part of the defense of Besançon.

== Politician ==
Montgolfier was elected representative of the Loire in the French National Assembly on 8 February 1870, while still confined in Besançon. Riots broke out at Saint Etienne in which the prefect of the Loire, M. de l'Espée, died on 25 March 1871. On 27 March 1871 Montgolfier was sent as the government's extraordinary commissioner to restore peace, with full civil and military powers. The need had passed before he arrived. He was promoted to officer of the Legion of Honor on 12 March 1872.

In 1874 the Compagnie des Hauts-Fourneaux, Forges et Aciéries de la Marine et des Chemins de fer was struggling in a difficult economy. Montgolfier was named general director. In 1875 Montgolfier was appointed Chief engineer of Roads and Bridges.

In the 1876 elections Mongolfier was a candidate of the "Conservative Union." On 30 January 1876 he was elected Senator of the Loire. Again he sat on the right. He voted in favor of dissolving the Chamber as requested by the Minister Albert de Broglie. After the cabinet fell on 16 May 1876 he was proposed as Minister of Public Works several times by Montgolfier. He lost his seat in the Senate in the election of 5 January 1879.

== Later years ==
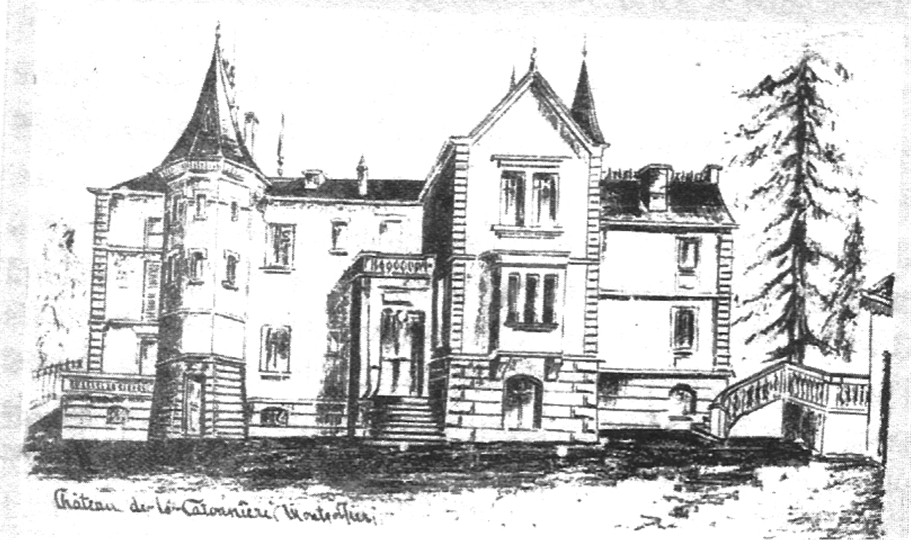
The Chateau Verpilleux-Montgolfier at the end of the 19th century

Montgolfier retired from politics in 1879 and devoted himself to industry. In 1880 he became president of the Comité des forges. He became a member of the Saint Etienne Chamber of Commerce in 1887, and in 1888 was made president of the Chamber of Commerce.

Montgolfier remained general director of the Compagnie des Hauts-Fourneaux for most of the rest of his life. When he took office in 1874 the annual sales turnover was 20 million francs, and at the end of his tenure it had risen to 80 million francs. He paid particular attention to the works at Saint-Chamond and Assailly, where he developed the special fabrications that brought fame to the factories. At Saint-Chamond he built a forge that could make 80-ton ingots, and he installed a great steam hammer with a 100-ton ram.

He developed arms manufacture at Saint-Chamond, and also delivered large quantities of rails to major French railroad companies. In 1881 he founded the Forges du Boucau near Bayonne. The factory at Boucau was prepared when the Midi rail network decided to replace its iron rails with steel. Between 1887 and 1890 he built huge workshops which, among other products, made most of the land turrets that armed the eastern fortresses of France, and provided turrets to various foreign powers, particularly Romania. The forges also produced train shields and marine turrets.

In 1908 Montgolfier was forced by illness to give up the general directorship, although he continued to live in Saint-Chamond and to take an interest in the company's affairs. He was a member of the Development Council of the National Conservatory of Arts and Crafts. He died on 23 January 1913 in his chateau at Saint-Chamond, Loire.
