= Barbara Jo Revelle =

American artist (born 1946)

Barbara Jo Revelle (born 1946) is an American artist known for her public murals and photography. Among Revelle's works is A Colorado Panorama: A People's History, a 200-foot (61 m) long porcelain tile mural installed along the side of the Colorado Convention Center in Denver. The work features the faces of 168 Coloradans, but no official key to the faces was produced.

== Collections ==
- Seattle Art Museum
- Los Angeles Museum of Contemporary Art
- Museum of Contemporary Photography
- Center for Creative Photography
- Portland Art Museum
- Oakland Museum of Contemporary Art
