= Y class =

Y class or class Y may refer to:

== Rail transport ==
- GNoSR Classes X and Y, two similar classes of 0-4-2T steam locomotives
- NCC Class Y, a class of 0-6-0T steam locomotive
- NER Class Y, a 4-6-2T steam locomotive
- NZR Y class, a class of 0-6-0T steam locomotive
- South Australian Railways Y class, a steam locomotive class built in South Australia
- Silverton Tramway Y class, a class of steam locomotives
- SNCF Class Y 7100, a class of small diesel shunters
- SNCF Class Y 7400, a class of small diesel shunters
- SNCF Class Y 8000, a class of diesel shunter built between 1977 and 1990
- SNCF Class Y 8400, a class of small diesel shunters
- SNCF Class Y 9000, the new designation for modernized and re-engined Y7100 and Y7400 shunters
- Tasmanian Government Railways Y class, a type of Bo-Bo diesel electric locomotive
- Victorian Railways Y class, a class of steam locomotives
- Victorian Railways Y class (diesel), a small branch line and shunting unit
- WAGR Y class, a diesel electric locomotive introduced in 1953
- Y-class Melbourne tram
- Y1-class Melbourne tram

== Other uses ==
- Y-class lifeboat, a class of small inflatable boat operated by the RNLI of the United Kingdom and Ireland
- Spectral class Y, spectral classification of a substellar object
- Economy class (travel class code used by airlines: "Y")
- Class Y, a capacitor type

== See also ==
- Y (disambiguation)
- Model Y (disambiguation)
