= SNCF Class Y 9000 =

French diesel locomotive

Class Y9000
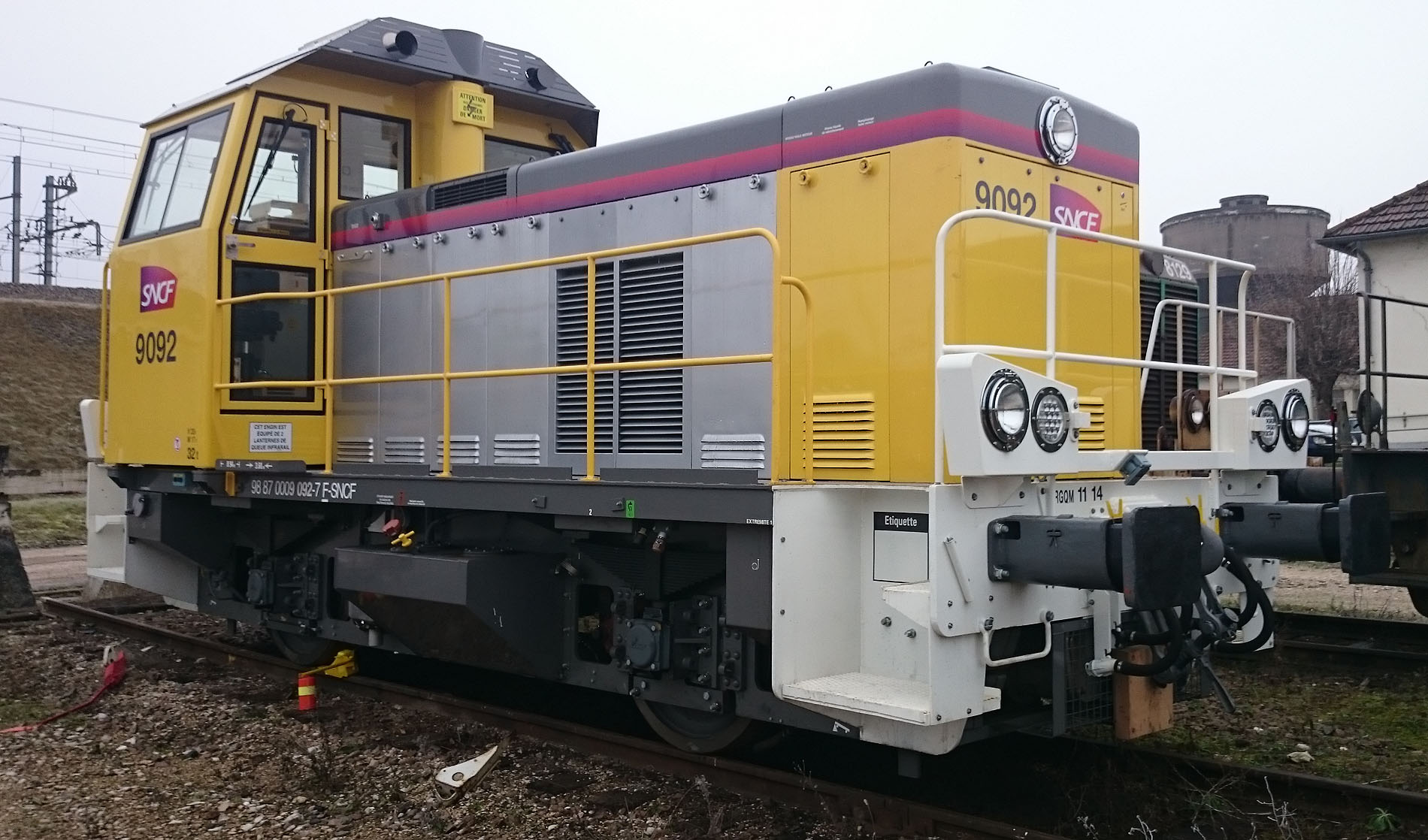
Type and origin
- Power type: Diesel
- Builder: (France) Socofer
- Build date: 1958 - 1972
- Total produced: 110 (option for 300 more)
- Rebuild date: 2010 - 2015
Specifications
- Configuration
  - Whyte: 0-4-0
  - UIC: B
- Gauge: 1,435 mm (4 ft 8 1/2 in) standard gauge
- Length: 8.9 m (29 ft 2 in)
- Loco weight: 32 t (31 long tons; 35 short tons)
- Fuel type: Diesel
- Prime mover: MAN D 2066 LE621
- Engine type: Diesel
- Transmission: Voith L220 reV2 Hydraulic
Performance figures
- Maximum speed: 60 km/h (37 mph)
- Power output: 265 kW (355 hp)
Career
- Operators: SNCF-INFRA
- Class: Y9000
- Number in class: 110 (As of 2015)
- Numbers: 9001 - 9110
- First run: 2010
- Disposition: In service

The SNCF Class Y 9000 is the new designation for modernized and re-engined Y7100 and Y7400 shunters. The refurbishment was undertaken by a consortium consisting of SNCF, Socofer and Voith Turbo. Socofer refurbished 22 full locomotives at its Tours plant, and delivered 88 kits to SNCF's Sotteville-Quatre-Mares workshops. The first rebuilt locomotive was presented at InnoTrans 2010.

The first locomotives will be used by SNCF infrastructure division INFRA and will as such carry the grey-yellow INFRA livery. Later locomotives will be used by SNCF freight division FRET.
