= Transport express régional =

French commuter rail

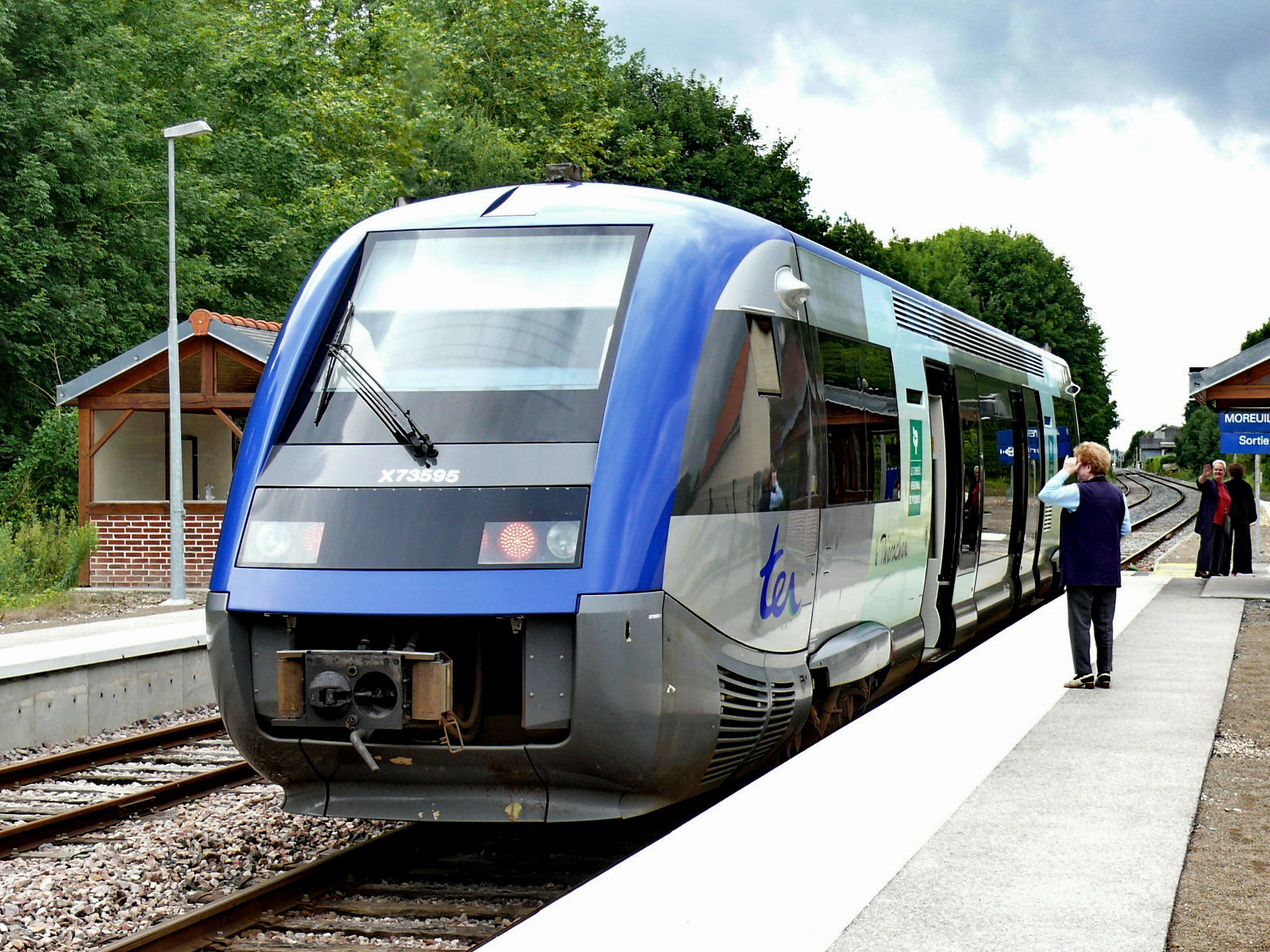
- A SNCF Class X 73500 train at Moreuil station

Overview
- Owner: French regional governments
- Transit type: Regional rail
- Daily ridership: 800,000

Operation
- Began operation: 31 March 1984
- Operator: SNCF

Transport express régional (French pronunciation: [tʁɑ̃spɔʁ ɛksprɛs ʁeʒjɔnal], usually shortened to TER) is the brand name used by the SNCF, the French national railway company, to denote rail service run by the regional councils of France, specifically their organised transport authorities. The network serves French regions; Île-de-France (Transilien) and Corsica (CFC) have their own specific transport systems. Every day, over 800,000 passengers are carried on 5,700 TER-branded trains.

TER is part of SNCF Voyageurs, a branch of the SNCF dealing with urban and regional passenger rail, which also includes Transilien, Intercités, Chemins de fer de la Corse (CFC), Keolis, and Effia.

== Overview ==
SNCF established the TER system in 1984 to provide a framework for the management of regional passenger services. Since the end of the 1990s, it has been closely coordinated with the regional councils, who sign an agreement with SNCF on the designated routes, the number of connections, the fares and the service levels.

TER services are heavily subsidised by French taxpayers. On average, 72% of the cost is borne by the State and the regional councils, with the travellers paying only about 28% of the cost. This cost tends to increase over time because the regional councils have steadily expanded the number of services.

TER trains consist of single or multiple-unit diesel, electric or dual-mode rail cars, as well as some Corail carriages previously used on intercity routes.

As of 2026, the following TER networks exist:

- Chemins de fer de la Corse
- Nomad Train
- TER Auvergne-Rhône-Alpes
- TER Bourgogne-Franche-Comté
- TER Bretagne
- TER Centre-Val de Loire
- TER Grand Est
- TER Hauts-de-France
- TER Nouvelle-Aquitaine
- TER Occitanie
- TER Pays de la Loire
- TER Provence-Alpes-Côte d'Azur

== Transfer of administration ==
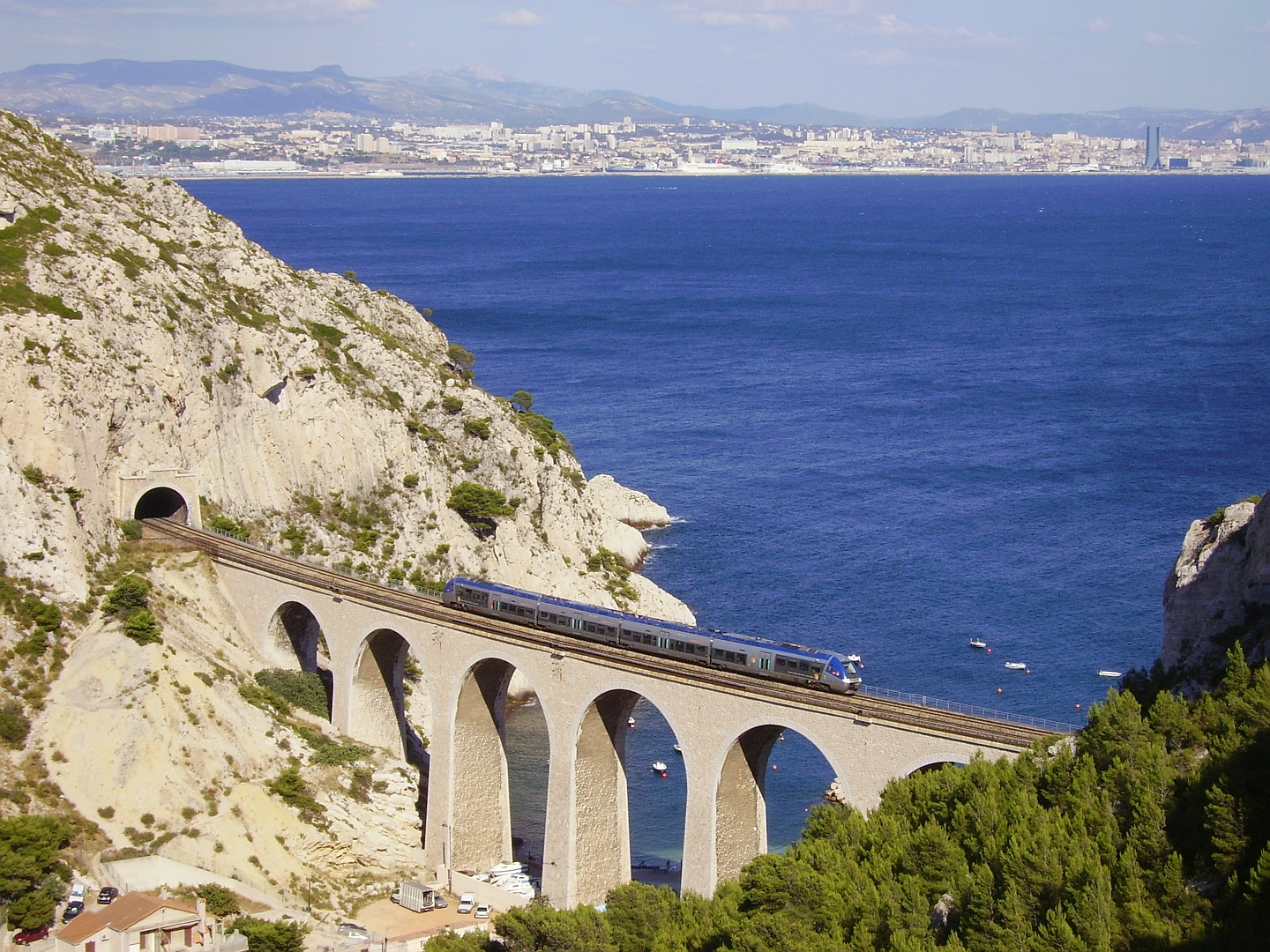
A TER Provence-Alpes-Côte-d'Azur between Marseille and Miramas

Seven régions have been experimenting with the transfer of administration of the regional rail network since 1997: Alsace, the Centre-Val de Loire, Nord-Pas-de-Calais (the North), Provence-Alpes-Côte d'Azur, Rhône-Alpes and the Pays de la Loire (Loire Valley), and, since January 1999, Limousin.

In 1998, the traffic increased to an average of 4.9% in these seven régions compared with 3.2% in other regions.

A few other regions are in turn signing on conventions interimédiaires in order to prepare for the increasing decentralization of the network: in particular, Haute-Normandie in September 1997, Midi-Pyrénées and Burgundy November 1997, Picardy in January 1998, and Lorraine in February 1998.

=== History of the regionalization of passenger trains ===
- 31 March 1994: The publication of the report Régions, SNCF : vers un renouveau du service public by the Haenel commission.
- 4 February 1995: The law of management and development of territory organized the transfer of responsibility of collective transportation in the interest of administrative regions.
- 19 December 1996: Signing of the first convention with the region of Rhône-Alpes.

=== Budgets affecting the public rail network ===
Several figures released by the regions:

Region	TER Budget	Portion of the yearly regional budget		Status
Alsace	€220 M	39%	(2004)	experimental regionalization since 1997
Bretagne	€100 M	14%	(2005)	
Bourgogne	€100 M	25%	(2005)	
Champagne Ardennes	€55 M	12.5%	(2004)	
Franche-Comté	€70 M	20%	(2005)	
Lorraine	€250 M	45%	(2005)	
Picardie	€130 M	20%	(2002)	intermediate agreement since January 1998
Nord-Pas-de-Calais	€260 M	21%	(2003)	experimental regionalization since 1997
Rhône-Alpes	€500 M	30%	(2005)	experimental regionalization since 1997

These figures do not take into account infrastructure expenses.

== TER and tourism ==
The SNCF have designated ten TER services as trains touristiques (touristic trains). They are:

- The Chemins de fer de Corse (Corsican trains) : trains operated from Bastia and L'Île-Rousse to Ajaccio
- The Train des Merveilles (Train of Wonders) : trains operated in the hills of Nice between the metropolis and Tende
- The Train des Gorges de l'Allier (Allier Gorges train) : trains operated between Langeac and Langogne.
- The Ligne de Saint Gervais – Vallorcine (Mont-Blanc Express)
- The Ligne de Cerdagne/train jaune (Yellow Train) : trains operated from Villefranche-de-Conflent and Latour-de-Carol-Enveitg (Andorra/Spain borders)
- The Autorail Espérance (Hope rail car) : gastronomical train between Bergerac and Sarlat
- The Chemin de fer du Blanc-Argent : services between Valençay and Salbris
- The Train des Alpes (Alps train) : trains operated between Marseille and Briançon (Intervilles trains) and between Gap and Grenoble
- The Ligne des Hirondelles (Swallows line) : between Dole and Saint-Claude
- The Ligne de la Côte Bleue (Blue Coast line) : suburban services operated from Marseille to Miramas or Avignon TGV via the Blue Coast creeks.
