= Biss och Kajs =

Swedish television show

Biss och Kajs (loosely translated from Swedish as "wee-wee" and "poo-poo", with initials 'B' and 'K' notably swapped for apparent creative purposes making them sound like characters) is a Swedish educational TV show explaining to children their bodily functions. It was shown as an example of Western decadence in a programme of the Russian state TV channel Rossiya 1 in November 2013, during the negotiations of the Association Agreement between the European Union and Ukraine. According to Rossiya 1 anchor Dmitriy Kiselev, "it exemplifies the kind of Western decadence that awaits Ukraine if it decides to join the EU and turn its back on Russia."
