= WI =

WI or wi may refer to:

== Places ==
- West Indies postal abbreviation
- Wiesbaden, a city in southwest Germany
- Wisconsin, US (postal abbreviation)

== People and characters ==
- Wi (mythology), a Lakota deity
- Wi (surname), a Korean family name
- Wi Man of Gojoseon, a military leader from the Han dynasty state of Yan, in modern Korea

== Businesses and organizations ==
- West Indies cricket team, in cricket statistics
- Women's Institutes, a locally organised group for women in various countries including Britain and Canada

== Other uses ==
- Wi (hangul), a Korean character
- Wi (kana), an obsolete Kana character
- Waterfall ice, the ice formed from a frozen waterfall; see Ice Climbing § Waterfall ice grading

== See also ==
- Wii, Nintendo's fifth home video game console
- W1 (disambiguation)
- WL (disambiguation)
- Wiwi (disambiguation)
