= 1W =

1W or 1-W may refer to:

- 1st meridian west

Roads

- OR 1W; see Oregon Route 99W
- SSH 1W (WA); see Washington State Route 104
- Arkansas Highway 1W; see Arkansas Highway 1

Aircraft

- AH-1W, a model of Bell AH-1 Cobra
- AH-1W, a model of Bell AH-1 SuperCobra
- PB-1W, a model of Boeing B-17 Flying Fortress
- HR2S-1W, a model of Sikorsky CH-37 Mojave
- XS2U-1W, a model of Vought XS2U

== See also ==
- Watt
- Week
- Win–loss record
- W1 (disambiguation)
