= Chemin de fer des Chanteraines =

Touristic railway line in France

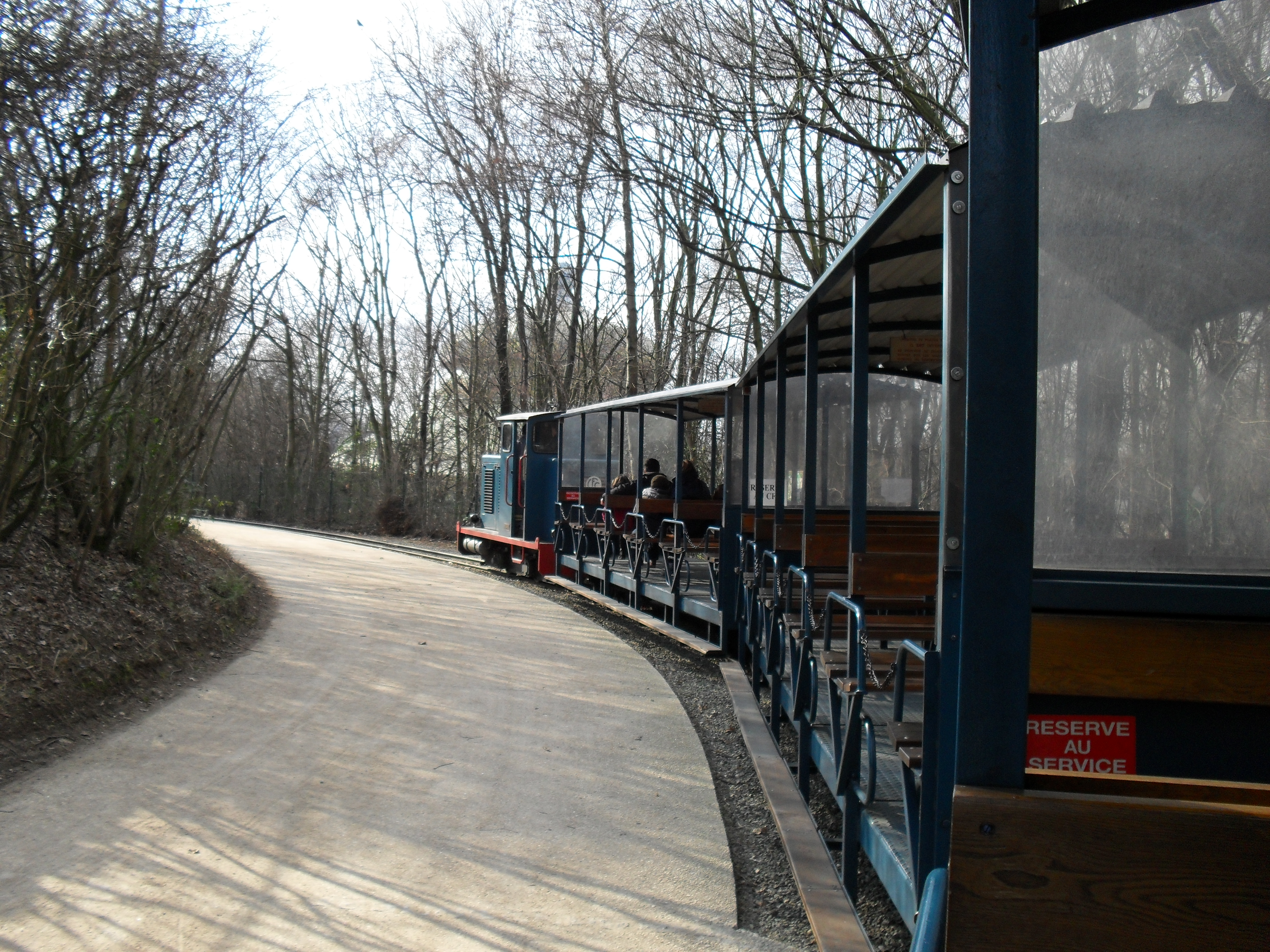

Overview
- Locale: France, Île-de-France, Hauts-de-Seine, cities of Gennevilliers and Villeneuve-la-Garenne
- Termini: Les Mariniers; Gennevilliers RER
- Stations: 6

History
- Opened: 1981
- Last extension: 1994

Technical
- Line length: 4.5 km (2.8 mi)
- Track gauge: 600 mm (1 ft 11 5/8 in)
- Operating speed: 20 km/h

The Chemin de fer des Chanteraines (Railway of Chanteraines) or CFC is a 600 mm narrow gauge tourist railway with six stations and 4.5 kilometers length in the Parc de Chanteraines in the French villages of Gennevilliers and Villeneuve-la-Garenne west of Paris. It opened in 1981 and its purpose is to link the different parts of the park.

== History ==
At the beginning of the 1970s, on the initiative of Roger Prévot, mayor of Villeneuve-la-Garenne from May 1953 until his death on October 6, 1999, the General Council of the Hauts-de-Seine department, of which he was vice-president at the time, decided to build the Chanteraines departmental park. Three years after the opening of the first section of the park, the original 3.1-kilometer-long route between Pont d'Épinay station (now Les Mariniers) and Passage de Verdure station above the A86 autoroute, was put into operation in 1981. This connected the various areas of the park. In spring 1984, under an agreement with the Hauts-de-Seine General Council, the Chemin de Fer des Chanteraines (CFC) association took over the operation of the route and the maintenance of the tracks and rolling stock. In July 1991, with the expansion of the park to the south, the line was also extended to the new terminus Les Tilliers-RER (now Gennevilliers RER) with a transition to line C of the RER and tramway Line T1. On the occasion of this line extension, a second depot building was built at the train yard next to the first. In October 2009, the CFC association organized the 19th International Narrow Gauge Railway Meeting. From 2010 to 2012, the northern section of the line behind the Les Fiancés station to Les Mariniers was completely renovated and was not used during this period. On March 22, 2023, the e OBO-01, the first of two purely battery-electric locomotives, equipped with compressed air brakes and built by the Compagnie de chemins de fer départementaux (CFD) in Paris, arrived at the CFC depot. After test runs in April, including with four wagons loaded with cement sacks, the locomotive made its first public passenger journeys on the open day in May. On the long Ascension weekend from 9 to 12 May 2024, the CFC club celebrated its 40th anniversary.

== Vehicles ==
The following lists are not exhaustive and will need to be completed or updated over time (last updated in May 2024):

=== Steam locomotives ===
Photo	Type	No. CFC	Constructor, Year	No. constructor	Status	Technical data
	0-2-0T	3	Decauville, 1914	No. 876	Operational	Named "Vincent"; Purchased in 2003; Length: 3.6 m, Weight: 5.5 t; Engine power: 35 ch; Coal bunker capacity: 300 kg; Water tank capacity: 1000 l
	0-3-0T	6	Decauville, 1920	No. 1770	Out of service (awaiting full restoration)	Named "Chanteraine"; Purchased in 1987; Length: 4.6 m, Weight: 8.0 t, Maximum speed: 20 km/h; Engine power: 60 ch; Coal bunker capacity: 600 kg; Water tank capacity: 1150 l
	0-2-0T	12	Orenstein & Koppel, 1905	No. 1627	Operational	Named "Bertha"; Purchased on 23. May 1992; Length: 4.2 m, Weight: 6.5 t; Coal bunker capacity: 390 kg; Water tank capacity: 550 l
	0-2-0T	13	Decauville/Borsig, 1911	No. 8069	Out of service (awaiting full restoration)	Named "Tabamar"; Purchased on 11. April 1994; Length: 4.4 m
	0-2-0T	18	Decauville, 1914	No. 869	Out of service (awaiting full restoration)	Named "La Bouillote"; Purchased in 2001; Length: 4.7 m, Weight: 5.0 t, Maximum speed: 20 km/h; Engine power: 35 ch; Coal bunker capacity: 300 kg; Water tank capacity: 1000 l
	0-3-0T	19	Orenstein & Koppel, 1914	No. 7429	Operational	Named "Camille"; Purchased in 2001; Length: 4.5 m, Weight: 7.5 t; Engine power: 50 ch; Coal bunker capacity: 460 kg; Water tank capacity: 1020 l
	0-2-0T	27	CFC, 2016		Operational	Named "Stoker"; Vertical boiler locomotive; Built in a traditional way by the CFC
	0-2-0T				Out of service (awaiting full restoration)	Named "Fuji"; Vertical boiler locomotive; Built by an individual with a steamboat engine; Purchased in 2019

=== Diesel locomotives ===
Photo	Type	No. CFC	Constructor, Year	Status	Technical data
	Diesel-hydraulic	OBO-01 & 02	Socofer, 1981	Operational	Length: 4.4 m, Weight: 7.5 t, Maximum speed: 16 km/h; Motor Deutz F4L with 57 ch
		04	Decauville, 1933	Operational	No. constructor: n° 643; Length: 3.1 m, Weight: 2.2 t; Motor CLM monocylindre with 10 ch
		05	Campagne, 1952	Operational	Purchased on 29. November 1986; No. constructor: n° 4075; Length: 3.5 m, Weight: 4.0 t, Maximum speed: 16 km/h; Motor Deutz F3L 912 with 42.5 ch
	DLD	07	Plymouth, 1946	Operational	Purchased on 20. June 1990; Length: 4.0 m, Weight: 8.0 t, Maximum speed: 25 km/h; Motor Deutz F3L 912 with 120 ch
	DLD	08	Plymouth, 1946	Operational	Purchased on 20. June 1990; Length: 4.0 m, Weight: 8.0 t, Maximum speed: 25 km/h; Motor Deutz F3L 912 with 120 ch
	DLD	09	Plymouth, 1946	Out of service (awaiting full restoration)	Named "Gilbert"; Purchased on 20. June 1990; Length: 4.0 m, Weight: 8.0 t, Maximum speed: 25 km/h; Motor Deutz F3L 912 with 120 ch
	DLD	10	Plymouth, 1946	Operational	Purchased on 20. June 1990; Length: 4.0 m, Weight: 8.0 t, Maximum speed: 25 km/h; Motor Deutz F3L 912 with 120 ch
	LD1	11	Orenstein & Koppel, date unknown	Operational	Length: 2.5 m, Weight: 2.1 t; Motor diesel MAN with two cylinders
	LO 20	14	Schöma, 1940	Out of service (awaiting full restoration)	No. constructor: No. 541; Length: 2.8 m, Weight: 3.7 t; Motor diesel with two cylinders; This shunter has retained its original SELVE two-stroke diesel engine (there are only two known examples in working order).
		16	CFC, date unknown	Situation unknown	Length: 4.0 m; Motor Hercules with four cylinders; Built in a traditional way by the CFC, its construction around a generator powered by a Hercules gasoline engine is quite unusual. Its manufacturer had even installed a compressor and an air tank.
		17	Gmeinder, date unknown	Out of service (awaiting full restoration)	Length: 2.6 m, Weight: 3.5 t; Motor diesel monocylinder
	ZL 114	20	Arnold Jung, 1937	Out of service (awaiting full restoration)	Acquis en 2001.; No. constructor: n° 7604; Length: 2.2 m, Weight: 5.4 t, Maximum speed: 15 km/h; Motor diesel two-cylinder 24 hp flywheel
		21	CFC, date unknown	Operational	Purchased in Octobre 2004, then restored; Length: 3.9 m, Maximum speed: 15 km/h; Built in a traditional way by the CFC on the basis of a chassis (from the 1950s) of the JW 15 type built by the company CACL ex Jules Weitz (Chantiers et Atelier de Construction de Lyon).; Motor UNIC type MZ32 water cooled four cylinders

=== Batteryelectric locomotives ===
Photo	Type	No. CFC	Constructor, Year	Status	Technical data
		e OBO-01 & 02	CFD, 2023	Operational	Arrival at CFC on 22. March 2023; Maximum speed: 16 km/h; Electric accumulator motor (lithium batteries); Air brakes

=== Passenger cars ===
Photo	Type	No. CFC	Constructor, Year	Status	Technical data
		V-1 to V-6	Socofer, date unknown	Operational	Two-bogie portable lamp; Length: 8.0 m, Weight: 2.5 t; 40 seats per car (240 seats in total); Equipped with "Rockinger" coupling and air brake
		V-7 to V-9	Constructor and date unknown	Operational	Two-axle portable light (known as the "Santa Claus"); Length: 2.5 m, Weight: 0.3 t; 6 seats per car (18 seats in total); Shoe brakes
		V-10	CFC, date unknown	Operational	Salon car with two bogies entirely built by the CFC (in collaboration with the Charles Petiet vocational school for automobiles in Villeneuve-la-Garenne); Length: 8.1 m, Weight: 3.5 t; Air brakes
		V-11	Decauville/CFC, date unknown	Operational	Small two-axle "Salon" car built on the basis of a Decauville braked chassis from the 1920s and converted into a saloon car; Length: 3.0 m, Weight: 1.0 t; 4 seats; Shoe brakes
		V-12 to V-14	De Dietrich/CFC, 1914	Operational	Two-axle "Bathtub" car built from platforms system Péchot; Length: 6.0 m, Weight: 3.5 t; 20 seats per car (60 seats in total); Air brakes
		V-15	Decauville/CFC, 1916	Operational	Closed car with two bogies built from a 1916 Decauville platform; Length: 7.2 m, Weight: 3.5 t; 20 seats; Air brakes
		V-16 and V-17	De Dietrich/CFC, 1914	Operational	Two-bogie portable lamps built from platforms system Péchot; Length: 6.0 m, Weight: 3.5 t; 22 seats per car (44 seats in total); Air brakes
		V-18 and V-19	Feldbahn, date unknown	Operational	Two-axle portable trailer with longitudinal benches; Length: 3.0 m, Weight: 0.5 t; 10 seats per car (20 seats in total); Shoe brakes

There is 11 freight wagons operational in summer 2024 plus various wagons and lorries in stock.

== Gallery ==
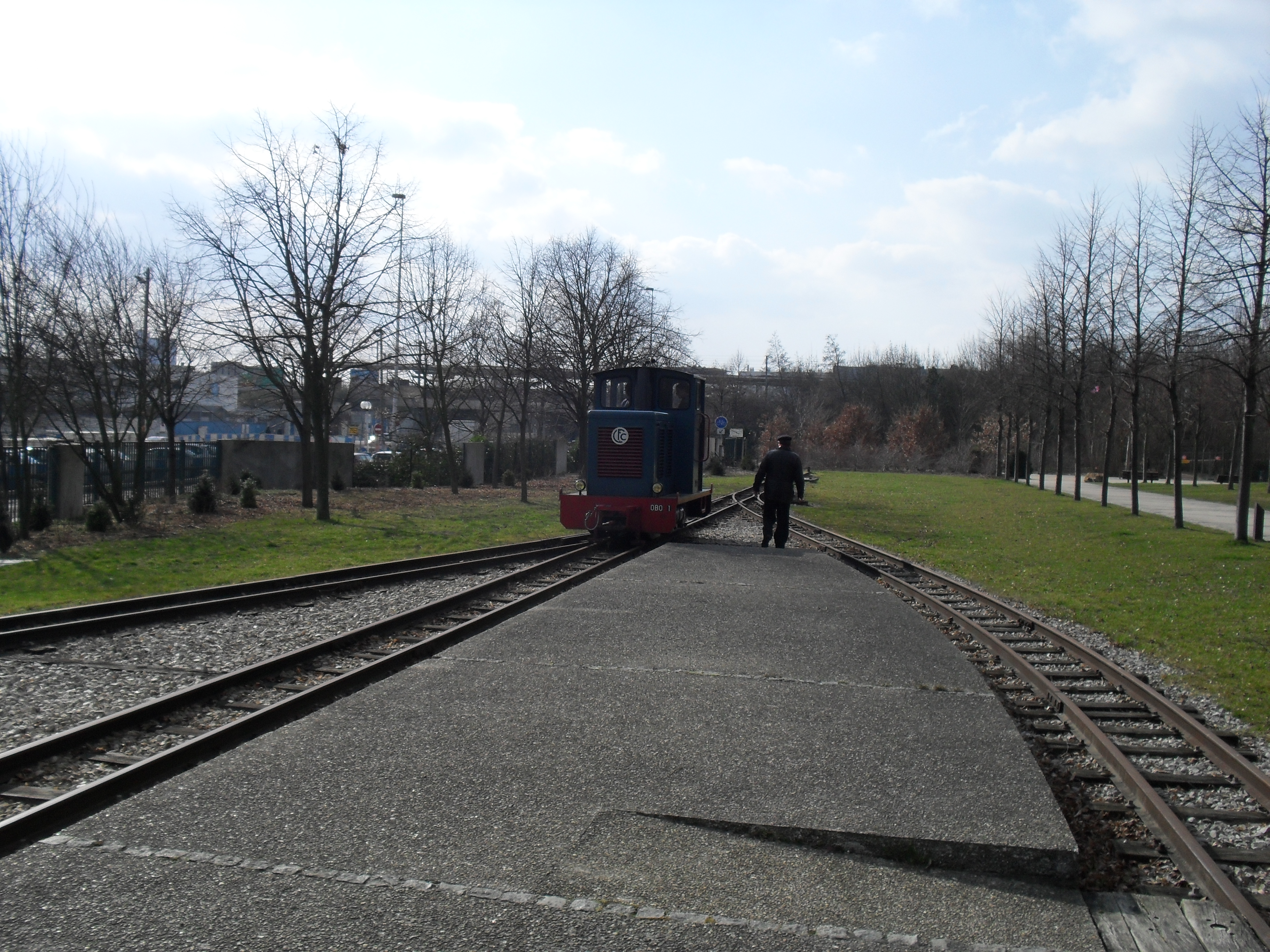
Diesel locomotive in the process of changing direction at Gennevilliers RER station (2009)

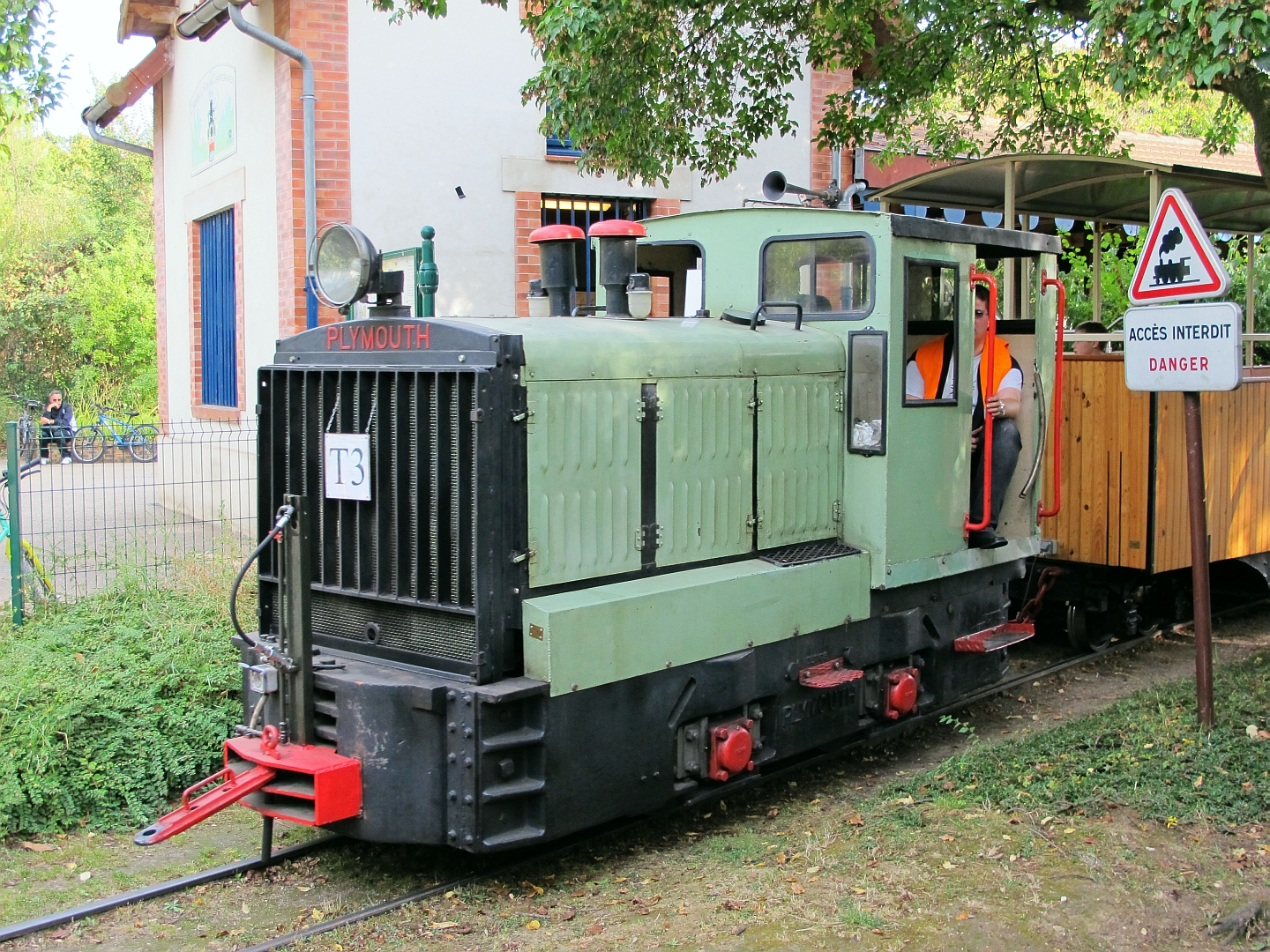
The Plymouth shunter (CFC no. 10) leaves La Ferme station (2012)

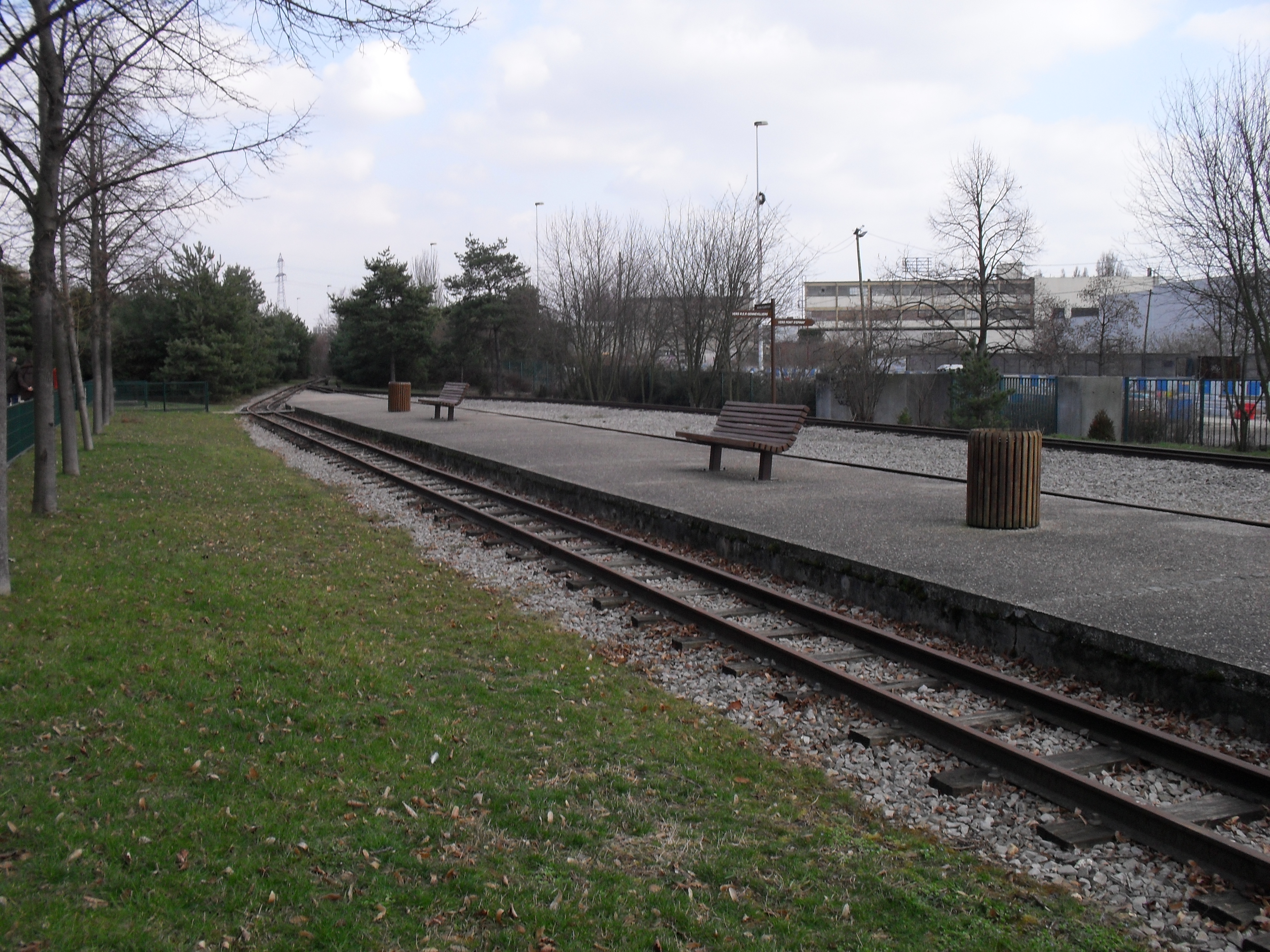
Platform at Gennevilliers RER station (2009)

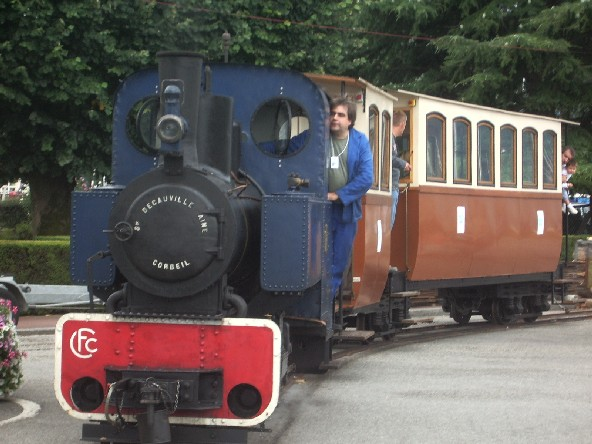
The steam locomotive Decauville n°869, built in 1914 and named "La Bouillote" (CFC no. 18), in Aix-les-Bains for the meeting "Navig’Aix" (2005)

== See also ==
- Musée des tramways à vapeur et des chemins de fer secondaires français
