= Locotracteurs Gaston Moyse =

French manufacturer

- Industry: Rail vehicle engineering
- Founded: 1922
- Defunct: 197?
- Headquarters: Paris, France
- Products: Diesel shunters

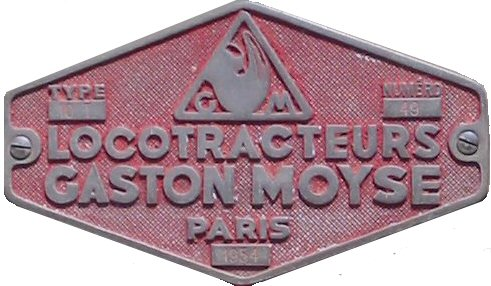
Plaque on a shunting locomotive manufactured by Locotracteurs Gaston Moyse

Locotracteurs Gaston Moyse was a French manufacturer of diesel shunting locomotives. Founded in 1922 by Gaston Moyse, the company closed in the late 1970s.

The company produced numerous shunting locomotives, including the Y 7400 and Y 8000 for the French state railways (SNCF), and classes CP 1020 and CP 1050 for the Portuguese state railways (Comboios de Portugal). and shunters for industrial use in steel works and on other industrial sites.
