= Model Y =

Model Y may refer to:

== Cars ==
- Ford Model Y, an automobile produced from 1932 to 1937
- Tesla Model Y, an electric compact crossover utility vehicle

== Airplanes ==
- Gee Bee Senior Sportster (also the Model Y), a sports aircraft built in the United States in the early 1930s
- Stearman-Hammond Y-1 (originally the Hammond Model Y), a 1930s American utility monoplane

== See also ==
- Y (disambiguation)
- Y class (disambiguation)
