= Wiwi =

Wiwi may refer to:

== Places ==
- Mount Wiwi, a mountain in West Papua, Indonesia

== People ==
=== Given name or nickname ===
- Awilda Carbia or "Wiwi" Carbia (1938–2009), Puerto Rican actress
- Wiwi-Anne Johansson (born 1950), Swedish politician
- Wiwi Nguyễn Lê Hương Quỳnh (born c. 1997), Vietnamese contestant on Supermodel Me (season 6)
- "Wiwi" Arão Manuel Lologi, Angolan footballer on the 2020–2021 F.C. Bravos do Maquis lineup

=== Surname ===
- Brant Wiwi, American competitor in the 2006 AMA Superbike Championship
- Pertiwi Wiwi, Indonesian competitor in karate at the 2013 Southeast Asian Games

== Other uses ==
- Wīwī, several species of rushes and sedges found in New Zealand
- WIWI-LP, a low-power FM radio station licensed to Milwaukee, Wisconsin

== See also ==
- Oui Oui, a French pop music group
- Wee-wee
- WI (disambiguation)
