= W1 =

W1 could refer to:

- W1, a postcode district in the W postcode area of London
- British NVC community W1 (Salix cinerea - Galium palustre woodland), one of the woodland communities of the British National Vegetation Classification
- W-1 tool steel, a water-hardening steel
- one of four manuscripts containing the Magnus Liber, or Magnus liber organi, a compilation of medieval music. The term is derived from the Wolfenbüttel library which holds the manuscript (Herzog August Bibliothek).
- GN W-1, an electric locomotive built for the Great Northern Railway
- LNER Class W1, an experimental locomotive designed by Sir Nigel Gresley for the London and North Eastern Railway
- second step of the W0-W6 scale for the classification of meteorites by weathering
- Wrestle-1, a Japanese professional wrestling promotion
- The computational complexity class W[1] in parameterized complexity
- The Apple W1 wireless pairing chip primarily used in AirPods
- W1 tram, a class of electric trams built by the Melbourne & Metropolitan Tramways Board.
- McLaren W1, a sports car succeeding the F1 and P1
- Sri Lanka Railways W1, a diesel-hydraulic locomotive
- W-1, an experimental aircraft later known as the ERCO Ercoupe

W-1 could refer to:

- U.S. uniformed services pay grades#Warrant Officer pay grades

== See also ==
- WI (disambiguation)
- 1W (disambiguation)
