= Y (disambiguation) =

Y, or y, is the twenty-fifth letter of the English alphabet.

Y or y may also refer to:

== Places ==
- Y, Alaska, US
- Y, Somme, France
- Y Mountain, a mountain in Utah, US
- Y (river), a river in northern Russia
- Postal code Y indicating Yukon (see List of Y postal codes of Canada)

== Art, entertainment, and media ==
=== Comics ===
- Y: The Last Man, a DC comics series by Brian K. Vaughan

=== Film and television ===
- Y (2017 film), a Malayalam film directed by Sunil Ibrahim
- Y (2022 film), an Indian Marathi-language thriller film
- Y, the production code for the 1966 Doctor Who serial The Celestial Toymaker
- Y?, An educational children's science program shown on the Nine Network in Australia
- Y: The Last Man (TV series), an American drama based on the comic book series Y: The Last Man

=== Games ===
- Y (game), a board game played on a triangular board
- Pokémon Y, a video game for the Nintendo 3DS

=== Literature ===
- Y (novel), a 2012 novel by Marjorie Celona
- "Y", a poem by Patti Smith from her book Early Work (1994)
- "Y" Is for Yesterday, the twenty-fifth and final novel in Sue Grafton's "Alphabet mystery" series, published in 2017

=== Music ===
==== Albums ====
- Y (EP), a single album by MBLAQ
- Y (The Pop Group album), an album by The Pop Group
- Y. (Bebe album), an album by Spanish singer Bebe
- Y, a repackaged edition of I, by Jaejoong
- 01011001 (binary number for 'Y' in ASCII), an album by Dutch progressive metal project Ayreon

==== Songs ====
- "y", a 2010 song by iamamiwhoami from the album bounty
- "Y..." a track on Belanova's Cocktail
- "Y", a 1961 song composed by Mario de Jesús Báez which has been covered by several artists including Luis Miguel on the album Vivo (2000)
- "Y", a 2021 song by Citizen Queen

== Economics and finance ==
- ¥, the symbol for Japanese yen
- Y, the symbol for income

== Enterprises and brands ==
- Alleghany Corporation, NYSE ticker symbol Y
- Brigham Young University, commonly known throughout the Mormon Corridor as "the Y" (as its rival, the University of Utah, is known as "the U")
- Y Combinator (company), American seed brand
- Y-Front a trademark for briefs by Jockey International, used in Britain as a synonym of briefs
- YM-YWHA, aka "the Y"
- YMCA, aka "the Y"
- YWCA, aka "the Y"

== Language ==
- Y (Cyrillic)
- y (IPA), the International Phonetic Alphabet letter for a close front rounded vowel

== Mathematics ==
- Y combinator, a fixed-point combinator in combinatory logic
- Y, the Bessel function
- Y, dependent variable
- Y or y, vertical axis in the Cartesian coordinate system

== Science ==
- Y, admittance, the inverse of electrical impedance Z
- Haplogroup Y (mtDNA)
- Hyperon
- Luminance (video), in many video color models, such as YIQ and YUV
- Tyrosine, abbreviated Y or Tyr
- Y boson
- Y chromosome
- y, year, a non-SI abbreviation for this unit of time
- Yellow, in the CMYK color model
- y, yocto-, the SI prefix for 10^{−24}
- Y, yotta-, the SI prefix for 10^{24}
- Yttrium, symbol Y, a chemical element
- Y, a hypothetical stellar class of ultra-cool dwarf stars

== Transportation and travel ==
- Y (New York City Subway service), an unused New York City Subway service label
- Tokyo Metro Yūrakuchō Line, a subway service operated by the Tokyo Metro, labeled
- Yotsubashi Line, a subway service operated by the Osaka Metro, labeled
- Basque Y, a Spanish high-speed rail network so called for its Y shape
- Y, code for economy class
- Yaesu Route of Shuto Expressway in Tokyo, Japan, numbered as Route Y
- , the official West Japan Railway Company service symbol for the Kure Line

== Other uses ==
- Ⓨ, a typographical symbol in Japanese resale price maintenance
- Generation Y, also known as Millennials
- Ms Y (or just "Y"), a refugee to Ireland involved in Irish court cases concerning abortion in the 2010s
- Y-shape, the shape that resembles the letter Y
- Y-stations, World War 2 listening stations
- Yankee, the military time zone code for UTC−12:00
- Aion Y, a Chinese electric SUV

== See also ==
- The Y (disambiguation)
- Model Y (disambiguation)
- Y class (disambiguation)
- YS (disambiguation)
- Why (disambiguation)
- Wye (disambiguation)
