= SNCF Class Y 7400 =

Class Y 7400
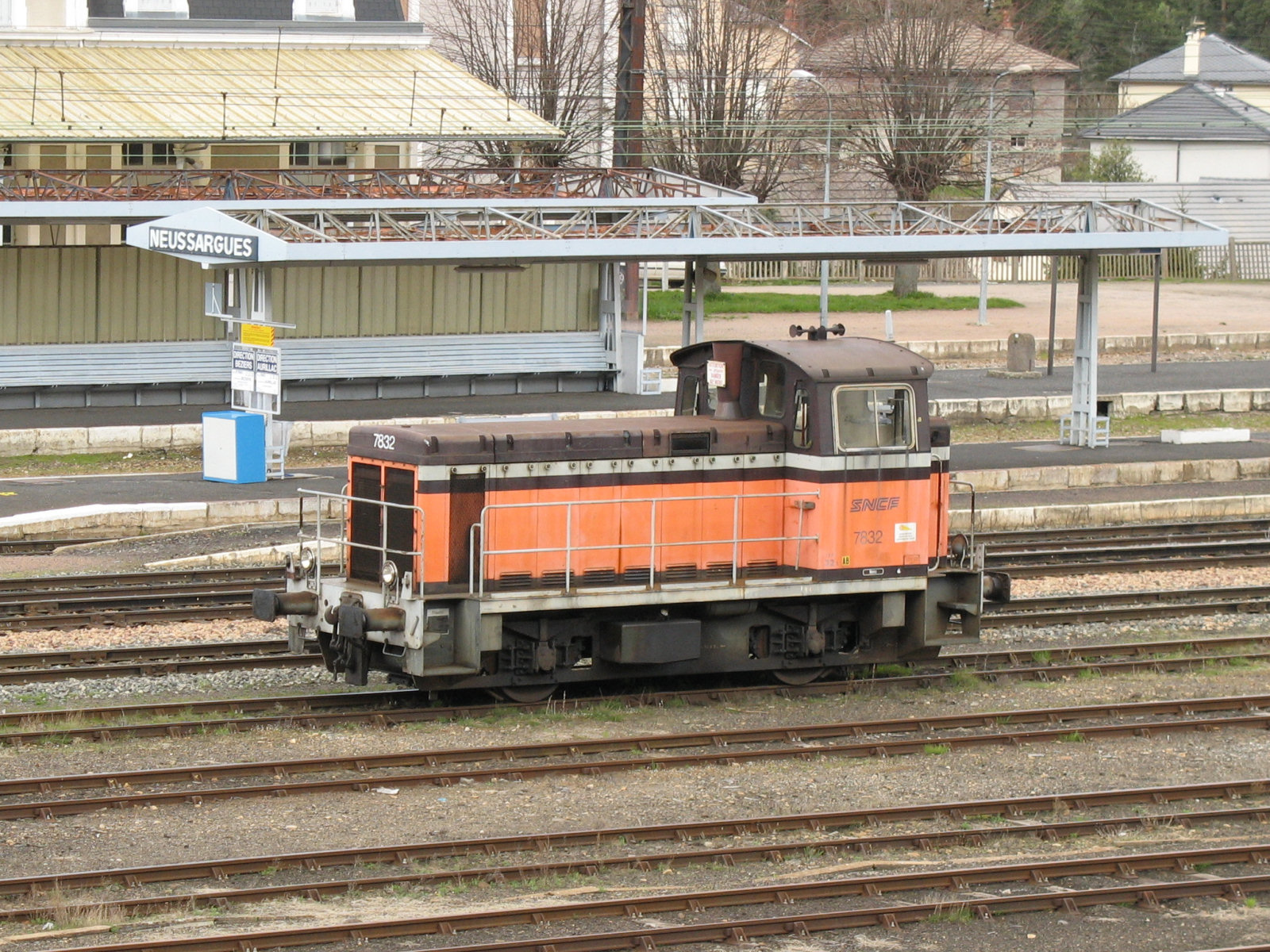
- Y 7832 at Gare de Neussargues, Cantal
Type and origin
- Power type: Diesel
- Builder: (France) Billard (France) Decauville (France) De Dietrich (France) Moyse
- Build date: 1959, 1963-72
- Total produced: 1 + 488
Specifications
- Configuration
  - Whyte: 0-4-0
  - UIC: B
- Gauge: 1,435 mm (4 ft 8 1/2 in) standard gauge
- Driver dia.: 1,050 mm (3 ft 5 in)
- Wheelbase: 3,685 mm (12 ft 1.1 in)
- Length: 8,940 mm (29 ft 4 in)
- Loco weight: 32 tonnes (31 long tons; 35 short tons)
- Fuel type: Diesel
- Prime mover: Poyaud 6PYT
- Engine type: Diesel
- Transmission: Mechanical Transmission (mechanics)?
Performance figures
- Maximum speed: 60 km/h (37 mph)
- Power output: 129 kW (173 hp)
- Tractive effort: 73 kN (16,000 lb_{f})
Career
- Operators: SNCF
- Class: Y7400
- Numbers: Y7001, Y7401–Y7888

The Y 7400 class of small shunters is France's most numerous with 488 locomotives in the production build. The first 120 were built by Decauville, with further batches built by De Dietrich (105) and Moyse (263). They have the 0-4-0 ("B") wheel arrangement, 150 kW diesel engines and mechanical transmission. They can be found all over the French network.

During 1959 Y 7192 was converted to mechanical transmission and renumbered as Y 7001. This locomotive was the prototype for the Y7400 class.

== Operators ==
In addition to the locomotives operated by SNCF, RATP have two Y 7400 class locomotives built in 1969 by Moyse. They are numbered T 102 & T 103 and were not part of the SNCF fleet. Likewise VFLI have two Y 7400 locomotives, 088 & 089, which were originally built for CFD. VFLI have augmented their fleet with Y 7474 and Y 7684 purchased from SNCF.

Some of them are preserved by tourist railroads.
