= Chemins de fer de la Corse =

Regional rail network serving the French island of Corsica

Old logo of Chemins de fer de la Corse, inspired by the SNCF logo (1985–2005)

Chemins de fer de la Corse (French pronunciation: [ʃəmɛ̃ də fɛʁ də la kɔʁs], CFC; Corsican: Camini di Ferru di a Corsica) is the name of the regional rail network serving the island of Corsica. It is centred on the town of Ponte Leccia, from which three main lines radiate to Ajaccio, Bastia, and Calvi. The section following the northwest coastline between L'Île-Rousse and Calvi, known as the Balagne line, gives access to many beaches and is very popular with tourists.

A fourth line, running from Casamozza (on the Bastia line) down the east coast of the island to Porto-Vecchio was badly damaged by bombing during World War II and never reopened.

== History ==
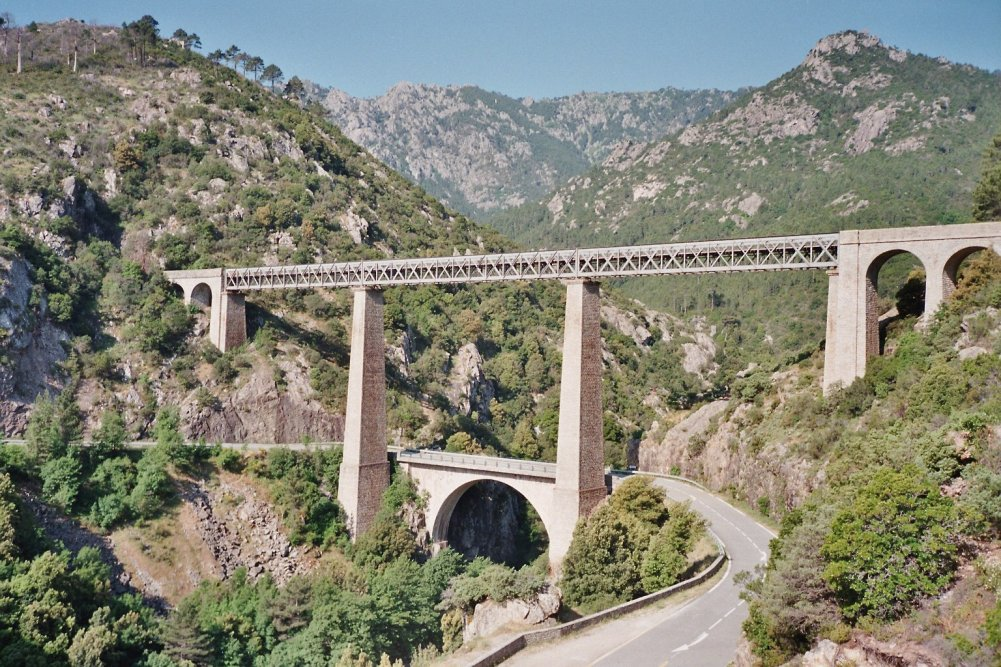
Gustave Eiffel's viaduct at Vecchio

In 1877 it was decided to build a metre-gauge railway in Corsica, despite the very difficult terrain it would have to cross. Legislation was passed on 4 August 1879 for the construction of the railway. The first lines opened on 1 August 1888 between Bastia and Corte and also between Ajaccio and Bocognano. The network was gradually opened in sections until 1894. A line to Porto-Vecchio opened in stages, the final section opening in 1935, but this was to be short lived owing to the war. There were proposals to build lines from Ajaccio to Propriano and also from Porto Vecchio to Bonifacio, but these lines were not built.

In 1955, there was a proposal to close the Calvi – Ponte-Leccia line; and in 1959 another proposal to close the whole network, which was successfully opposed by the railway workers and the citizens of Corsica. In 1972, another proposal for closure was fought off.

== Network ==
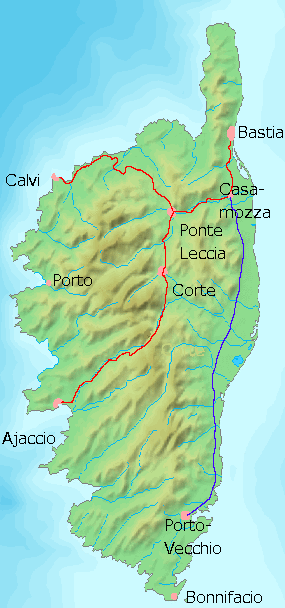
Route map

With a length of 232 kilometres (144 mi), the network is composed of two lines, both single track:

- Ajaccio–Bastia via Ponte-Leccia and Corte, 158 kilometres (98 mi);
- Calvi–Ponte Leccia via L'Île-Rousse, 74 kilometres (46 mi).

A third line of 130 kilometres (81 mi), opened between 1888 and 1935, served the east coast; it linked Casamozza to Porto-Vecchio. After suffering much damage during World War II in September 1943, it was never restored, although the section between Casamozza and Folleli remained open until 1953. The track of the disused line, between Casamozza and Moriani, at 42°31′N 9°26′E, is being considered for reopening.

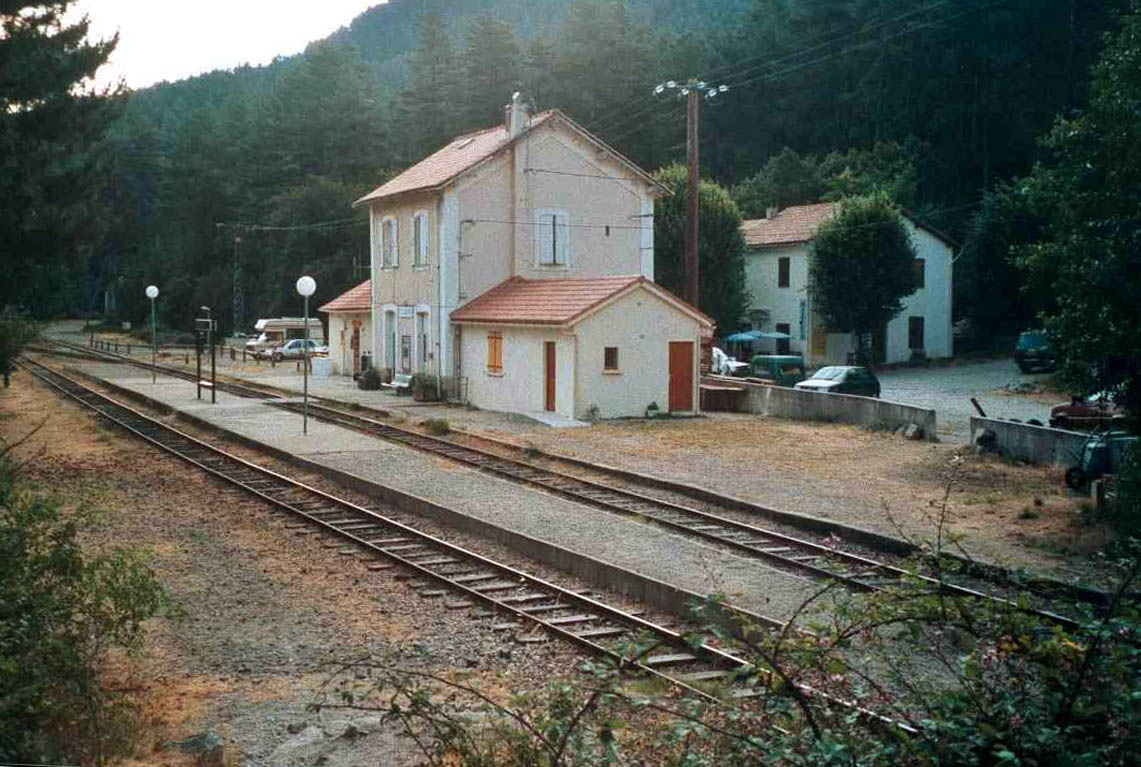
Vizzavona station.

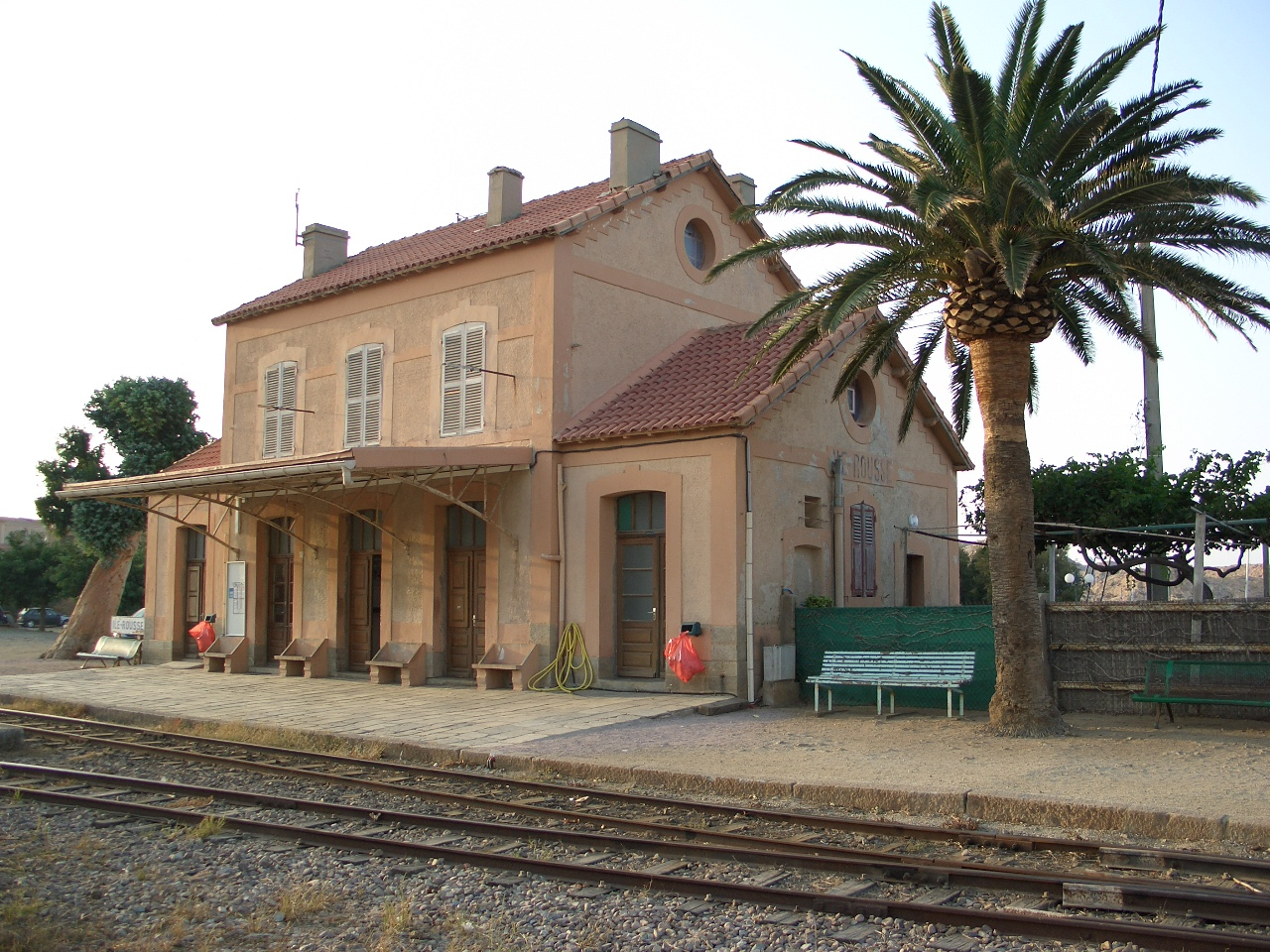
L'Île-Rousse station.

The island's geography and topography has forced the line to follow it. The network has 32 tunnels and 51 bridges and viaducts. The longest tunnel, at 3.9 kilometres (2.4 mi), is near Vizzavona. This tunnel is also the highest on the network, at 906 metres (2,972 ft) high. The viaduct at Vecchio, 140 metres (459 ft) long and 94 metres (308 ft 5 in) high, was designed by Gustave Eiffel.

The CFC is the only metre gauge line in France carrying freight. One train a day operates over the Ajaccio-Bastia line. In winter, the Vizzavona pass is often blocked, and closed to road traffic. Most of the goods wagons are today used for track maintenance purposes.

== Ownership ==
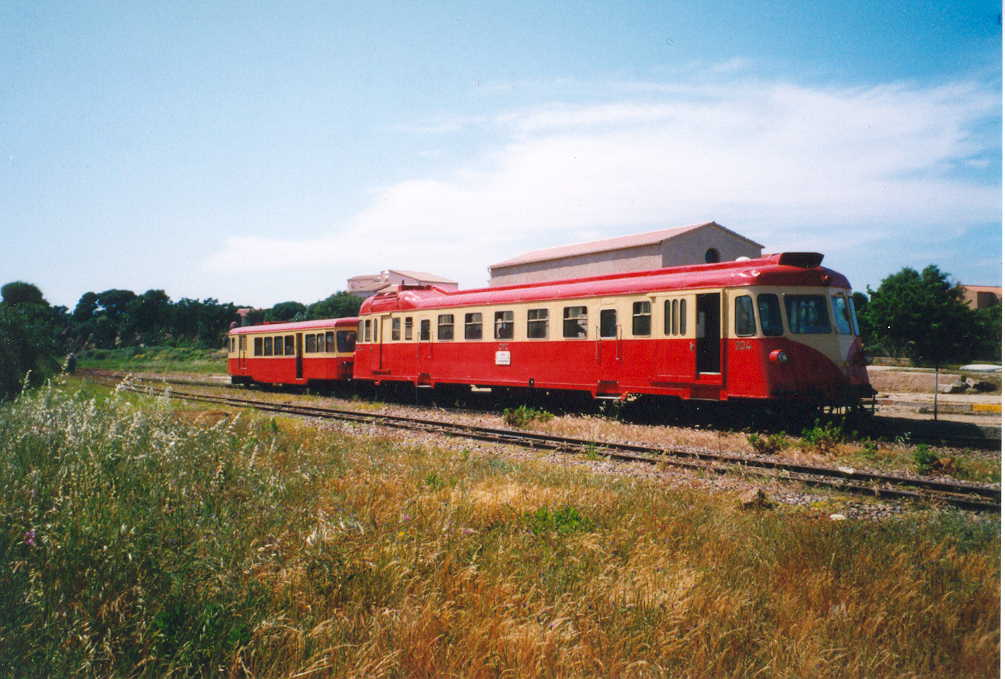
Renault AHB8 railcar with Billard trailer

The network is owned by the government of France and not by Réseau Ferré de France. The Collectivité Territoriale de Corse, CTC, is the concessionary holder of the network, under the act of parliament on regionalisation of railways in France, and is the transport authority and regulator of railway services. The CTC has entrusted the SNCF with the operation of rail services since 1 January 1983. A nine-year agreement between these bodies under the Loi Sapin came into effect on 1 September 2001.

A modernisation plan agreed by the national government, the CTC and the SNCF envisages the investment of 110 million euros. These funds are to be allocated to the modernisation of rolling stock and infrastructure, thus reducing travel time. An extension of the network towards the airports at Bastia and Ajaccio is also envisaged.

== Rolling stock ==
=== Current rolling stock ===
Services are provided with sixteen multiple units and locomotives. All are diesel-powered.

Multiple units

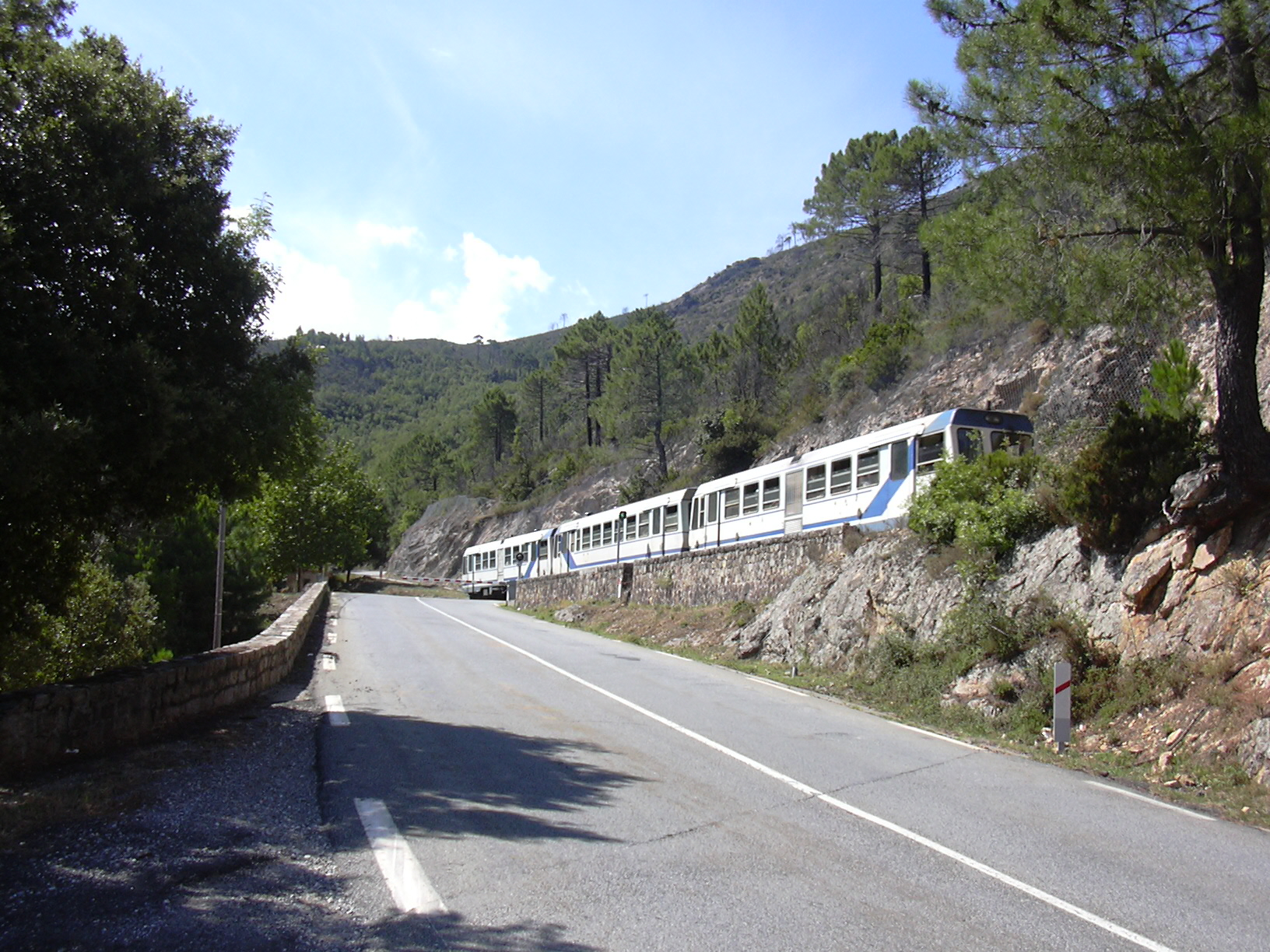
A Corsican diesel multiple unit

- Four 250 kW (330 hp) fr:Compagnie des chemins de fer départementaux CFD X2000 series railcars built between 1975 and 1983, X2001, X2002, X2004 and X2005.
- Two 360 kW (480 hp) X5000 series railcars, X5001 and X5002.
- Seven Soulé fr:Soulé X97000 series railcars numbered X97051–X97057 built between 1989 and 1997. These railcars have two 360 kW (480 hp) engines.
- Six Soulé trailers with driving cabs built 1997.
- Three Renault ABH8 series railcars, X201, X204 and X206. These are scheduled for withdrawal once all the new AMG800 railcars are introduced into service.

There are also ten Billard railcars that have had their engines removed, used as trailers. These include XR113, XR504, XR505 and XR526.

Twelve AMG800 railcars were delivered between June 2007 and 2009. These will reduce journey times on the Bastia-Corte-Ajaccio route to 2h 30m and allow the Soulé railcars to be transferred to the Bastia-Calvi route. The first AMG800 railcar arrived on 23 June 2007.

Locomotives

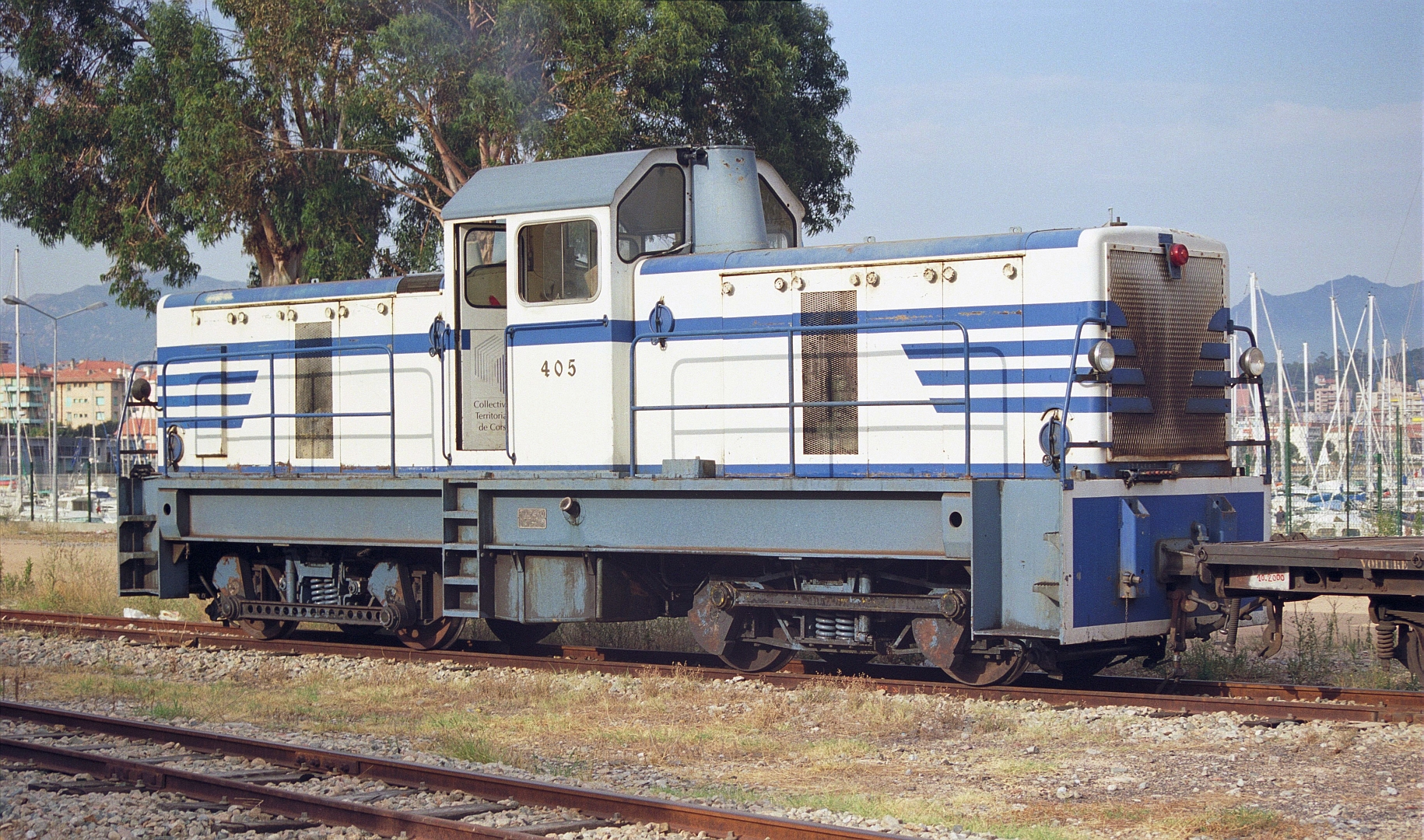
BB405 diesel locomotive

- Three CFD B-B centre cab diesel locomotives built by Brissonneau et Lotz. BB404 ex Chemins de Fer de Provence. BB405 new to CFC in 1966 and BB406 built in 1973 as a standard-gauge locomotive, regauged and transferred to CFC in 1995.
- Three FAUR diesel locomotives built in Romania, 45001–003 with Maybach engines. Owned by Constructions Ferroviaires Giragr (CFG), used for track improvement work prior to introduction of the AMG800 railcars.
- Nine FAUR L45H B-B diesel–hydraulic locomotives, 60001–009 re-engined with 570 kW (770 hp) Caterpillar engines. Owned by CFG, used for track improvement work prior to introduction of the AMG800 railcars. These locomotives will leave Corsica in 2009.

Service vehicles

- Two Geismar VTM service vehicles, numbered 850.01 and 850.02. 850.01 has a hydraulic crane and 850.02 has a personnel cabin.
- One Matissa tamper.
- One Köf 4w diesel shunter converted to metre gauge, numbered D200. This locomotive left Corsica in 2009.

Amongst the freight stock still in service is a bogie flat wagon converted into a fire-fighting wagon.

=== Former rolling stock ===
Steam locomotives

- Fourteen 0-6-2T locomotives, numbered 28–41, built by Fives-Lille in 1887 and 1888.
- Four 2-6-0T locomotives, numbered 53–56, built by Fives-Lille in 1891.
- Twenty two 0-4-4-0T Mallets, numbered 301–319 and 351–353, built by Société Alsacienne de Constructions Mécaniques (SACM) between 1893 and 1922.

Diesel locomotives.

- 403 created from the remains of Billard railcar X103. Withdrawn in 1962.
- 1 built by CFD in 1948, to CFC in 1966. Preserved at MTVS.
- 2 built by Voies ferrées du Dauphiné in 1950, to CFC in 1966.
- 3 built by CFD Seine et Marne in 1951, to CFC in 1967.
- 114 built from Billard railcar X114. In use until the early 1990s, now withdrawn from service and stored at Casarnozza.

Billard railcars.

- Six 160 kW (210 hp) Billard railcars numbered X101–X106, built in 1935 and 1936. X103 destroyed by fire in 1946. Remains used to create diesel locomotive 403.
- Six 110 kW (150 hp) Billard railcars numbered X111–X116, built in 1938. X114 destroyed during the Second World War. Remains used to create diesel locomotive 114.
- About 20 Billard railcars were acquired second-hand from various metre gauge railways in France when they closed. They were used as trailers, minus their engines. Many of the Billard railcars that were demoted to trailers have been scrapped.

Billard trailers.

- Eight Billard railcar trailers, built 1938.

CFD railcars.

X2000 destroyed by fire in 1980.

Crochat railcars.

Two petrol-electric Crochat railcars were in service from 1928 until an accident in 1928 led to their withdrawal.

De Dion-Bouton railcars.

X158 OC1 series. Ex Chemin de Fer de la Baie de Somme, Réseau Breton and Chemin de Fer des Côtes-du-Nord, preserved at Langueux, France.

Renault railcars.

- Eight 300 horsepower (220 kW) Renault AHB8 railcars numbered X201 to X209 built in 1949. X202 used as spares source, X203 scrapped in 1980, X205 scrapped in 1983, X207 used as spares source, X208 scrapped in 1967.

Carriages.

- Twelve four-wheel carriages built in 1888.
- Thirty four bogie carriages, built between 1888 and 1891.
- Twenty one bogie corridor carriages, built between 1920 and 1932
- Eighteen small baggage vans, built in 1888.
- Eight large baggage vans, built between 1915 and 1927.

Freight stock.

The CFC had over 500 freight wagons. Open wagons were on 10 tonnes capacity. Other wagon types included flat wagons, vans, tarpaulin wagons, tank and hopper wagons, as well as three cranes.

Departmental stock.

- One Campagne inspection vehicle, built in 1932.
- Six Billard inspection vehicles, numbered 741–746, built in 1936.
- Billard railcar, formerly X503, rebodied and used as crew car.
- One inspection vehicle, details unknown.

== Service ==
Service is essentially composed of passenger trains. It is divided into different activities:

- Inter-urban services:
  - Four return journeys between Bastia and Ajaccio (158 km (98 mi), travel time 3 hours 25 minutes)
  - One return journey between Bastia and Calvi (120 km (75 mi), travel time 2 hours 44 minutes)
  - Three return journeys between Ponte Leccia and la Balagne, of which two terminate short at l'Île-Rousse where an interchange exists with the Tramway de la Balagne.
- Frequent suburban services:
  - Between Bastia and Casamozza (21 km; 13 mi) and nicknamed the Bastia métro. Twenty stations are served in 30 minutes.
  - Between Calvi and l'Île-Rousse (22 km; 22 km) and nicknamed Tramway de la Balagne. Eighteen stations are served in 50 minutes. Frequent service is provided throughout Summer with a reduced service in the Winter season.

Goods traffic amounts to less than 1,000 tonnes (980 long tons; 1,100 short tons) per annum.

== Notes ==
=== Bibliography ===
- Davies, W. J. K. (2002). A Contrast in Islands: The Narrow Gauge Railways of Corsica and Sardinia. Narrow Gauge Railways of Europe Volume 7. East Harling, Norfolk, UK: Plateway Press. ISBN 187198050X.
- Organ, John (2013). Majorca and Corsica Narrow Gauge. Narrow Gauge Branch Lines series. Midhurst, West Sussex, UK: Middleton Press. ISBN 9781908174413.
