= Socofer =

Rolling stock manufacturer

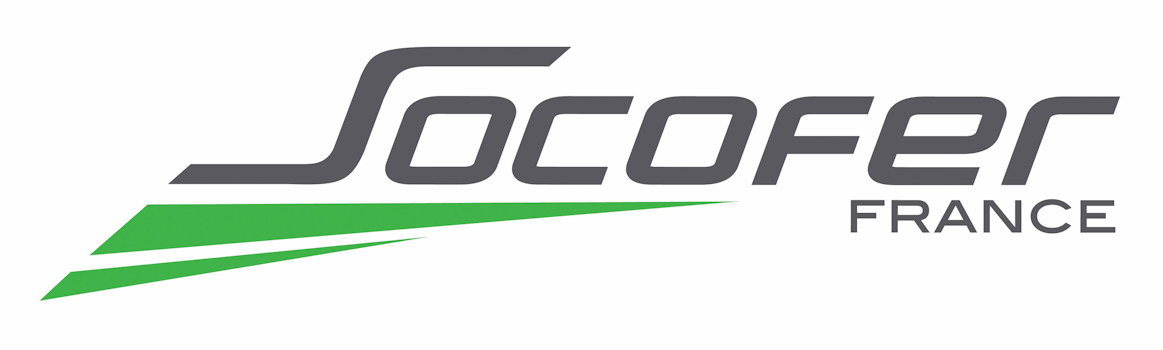
- Company type: Subsidiary
- Industry: Rail transport
- Founded: 1901; 125 years ago
- Headquarters: Marseille, France
- Area served: Worldwide
- Products: Locomotives; High-speed trains Intercity and commuter trains Trams; People movers Signalling systems

Socofer is the name for the railway construction company that before 1968 was known as Établissements Billard.

== History ==
Socofer, a French company established in 1965, acquired the railcar fabrication business of Billard the same year. The Billard mechanical shop was founded in 1920 and their completed their first rolling stock two years later. In 1928, the growth of the business led to the incorporation of Société Anonyme des Anciens Etablissements BILLARD et Cie.

== Production ==
- 600 mm (1 ft 11 5/8 in) narrow gauge locomotives for:
  - The French Army (type SCF 303)
  - Leisure parks.
  - Tourist railways.
- Narrow gauge carriages for touristic railways.

== Preserved rolling stock ==
- Two narrow gauge locomotives, built 1968, ex French Army, at APPEVA (T28 et T29).
- Two narrow gauge locomotives, built 1981, ex Chemin de fer des Chanteraines.
- A narrow gauge locomotive, built 1981, at the leisure park of Port aux Cerises.
- A narrow gauge locomotive, built 2000, on the Chemin de fer du Creusot.
- Two carriages, on the Chemin de fer des Chanteraines and the leisure resort of Port aux Cerises.
- A type T75 locomotive built by Socofer, not Billard, between 1960 and 1965 at the Train de Rillé (apparently left there circa 2000)
