= SNCF Class Y 8000 =

Class Y8000
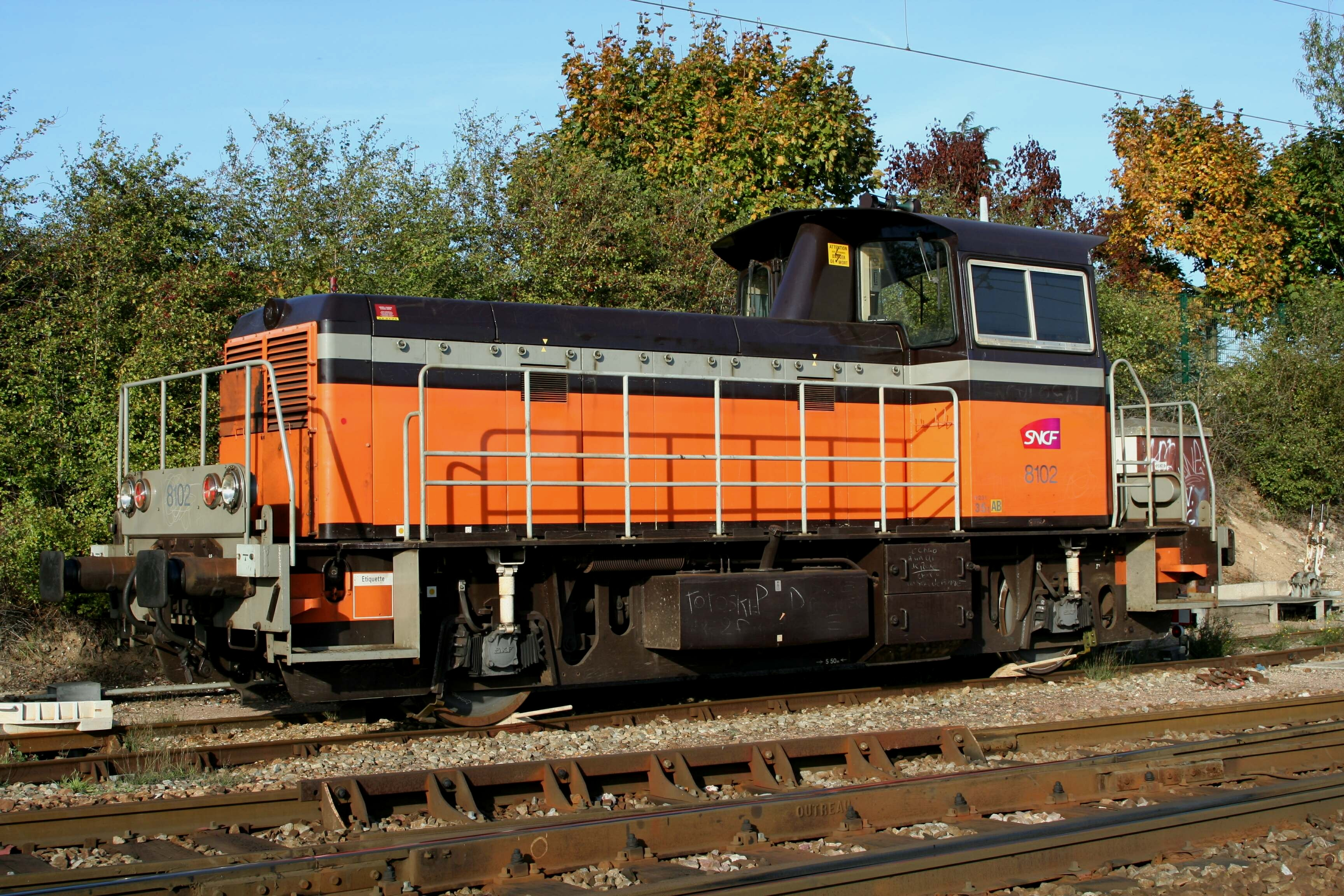
Type and origin
- Power type: Diesel
- Builder: Fauvet Girel / Moyse
- Build date: 1977–1989
- Total produced: 375‡
Specifications
- Configuration
  - UIC: B
- Gauge: 1,435 mm (4 ft 8 1/2 in) standard gauge
- Length: 10.14 m (33 ft 3 in)
- Loco weight: 36 tonnes (35 long tons; 40 short tons)
- Fuel type: Diesel
- Engine type: Original : Poyaud (SSCM)† re-engined : RVI
- Transmission: Voith hydraulic L2r4sU2
Performance figures
- Maximum speed: line speed: 60 km/h (37 mph) shunting speed: 30 km/h (19 mph) towed speed up to 100 km/h (62 mph)
- Power output: engine: 219 kW (294 hp) at wheel: 153 kW (205 hp)
- Tractive effort: Starting: 70 kN (16,000 lb_{f}); Continuous: 63 kN (14,000 lb_{f}) @ 4.5 km/h (2.8 mph)
Career
- Operators: SNCF
- Class: Y8000

The SNCF Class Y 8000 is a class of diesel shunter built between 1977 and 1990.

== History and design ==
The locomotives were developed by SNCF for shunting duties. Initial construction was by Locotracteurs Gaston Moyse until that company ceased business, then by Fauvet Girel.

Y 8000 machines were used to replace older shunting engines, as well as trip work on minor lines.

The locomotives were 2 axle machines with both axles powered by a Poyaud (SSCM) diesel engine via a Voith hydraulic transmission. Locomotives were later re-engined (1997) with lower emission RVI engines; when re-engined locomotives received the green SNCF Fret livery.

The locomotives also are certified for use in Italy, limited to shunting work: Y 8120 has been operated by SNCF subsidiary CapTrain Italia.

After 1989 production shifted to a mechanically identical Y 8400 type, which incorporated a radio control system for shunting.
