= Établissements Billard =

French manufacturer of railcars

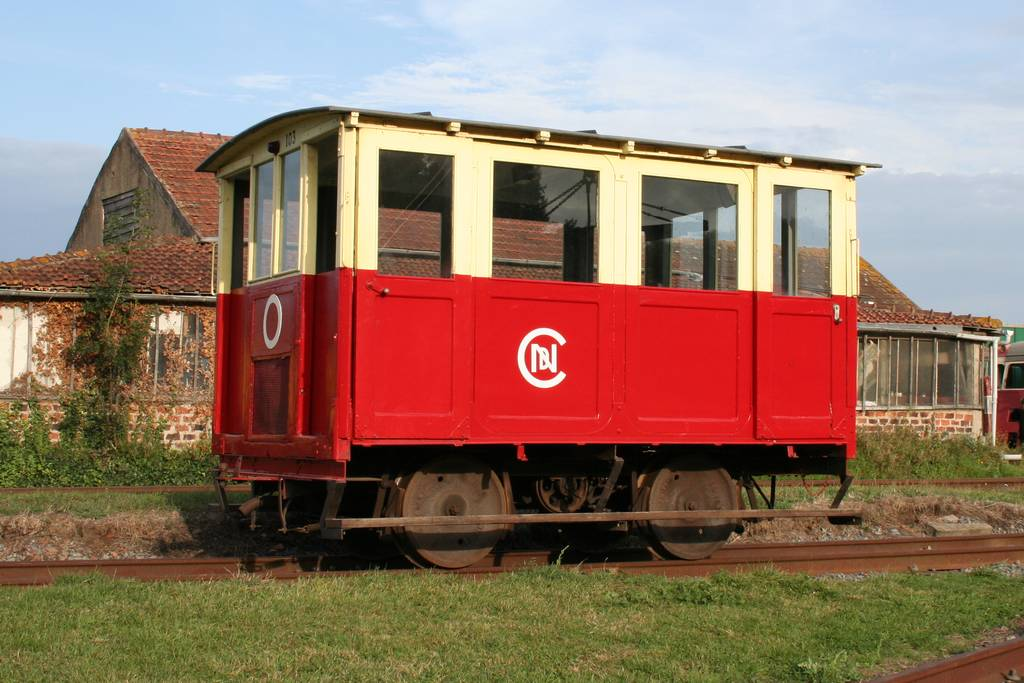
A Billard draisine, once circulating on the Réseau Breton and preserved by the ACFCdN.

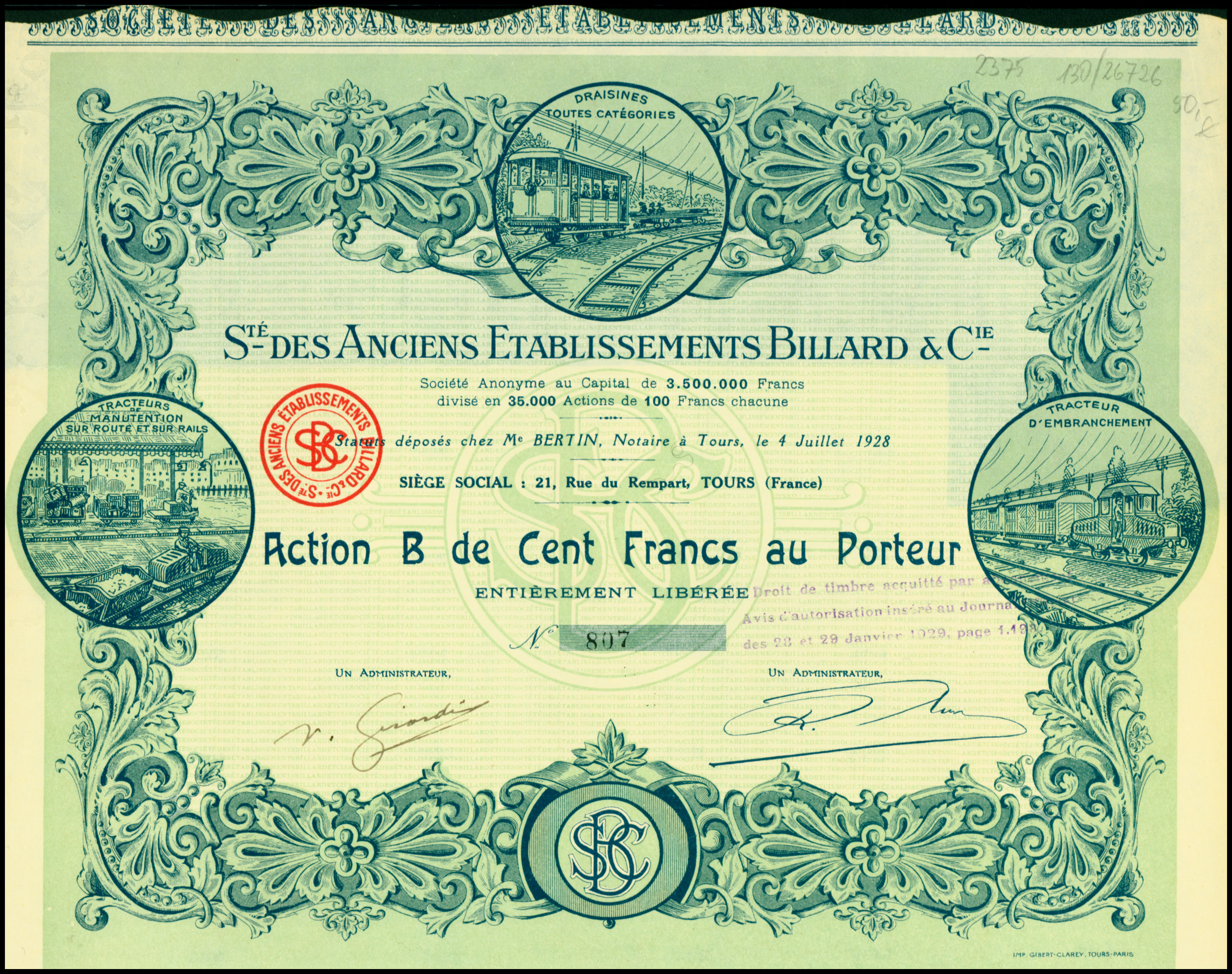
Share of the Anciens Etablissements Billard & Cie, issued 4. July 1928

Établissements Billard was a French railway rolling stock construction company founded in 1920 and based in Tours. It specialised in light railbuses and metre gauge and narrow gauge rolling stock. The business ceased trading in 1956 and later became Socofer.

== Production ==
=== Draisines ===
- Draisines : These worked on different VFILs, and for the "Big Companies" which became the SNCF.

=== Locomotives ===
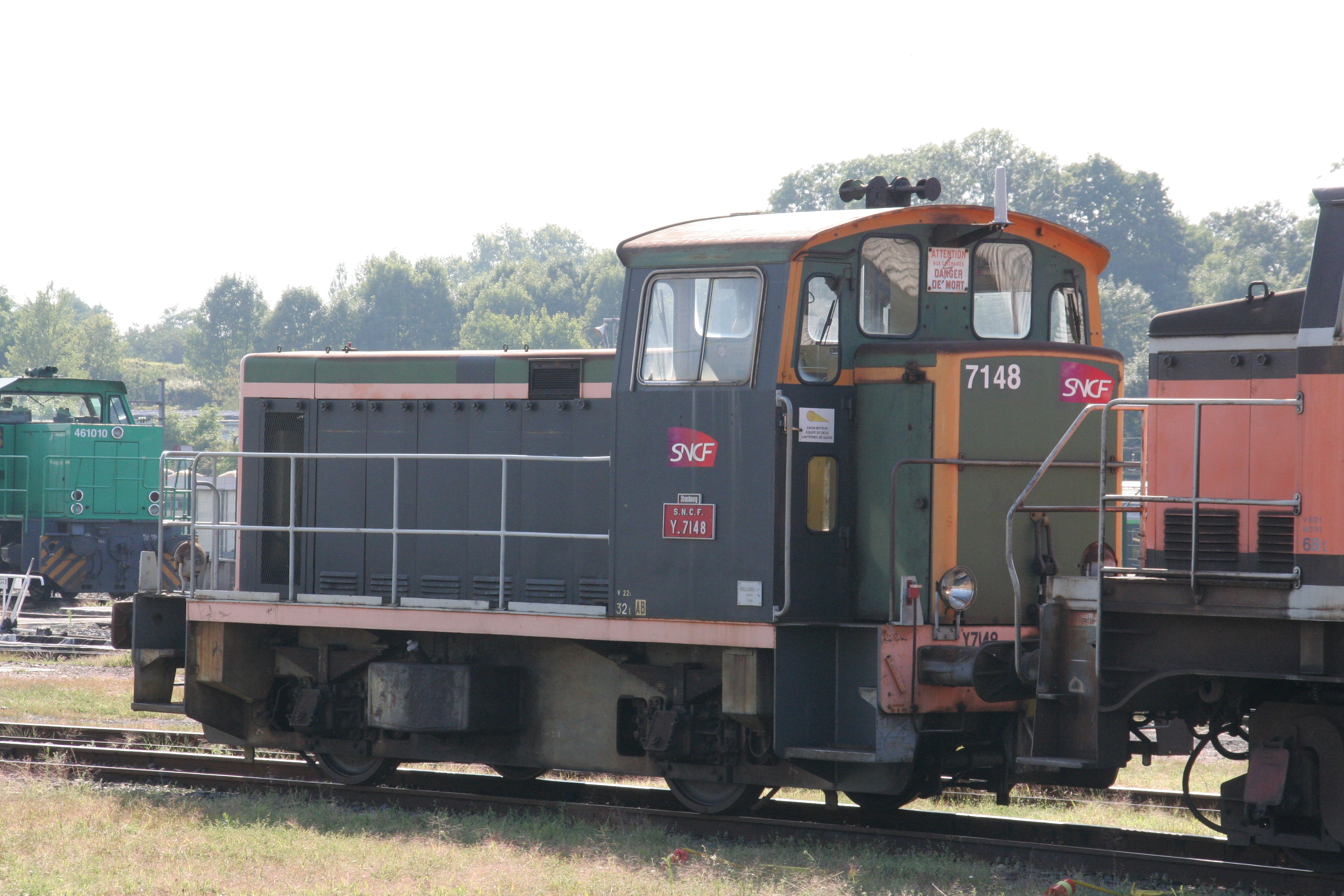
Billard Locomotive Y 7200

- T50
- T75D
- T75P
- T75G

These were designed for the French Military Railway. They were used, among other things, to service the Maginot Line.

- SNCF Class Y 7100

=== Railbuses ===
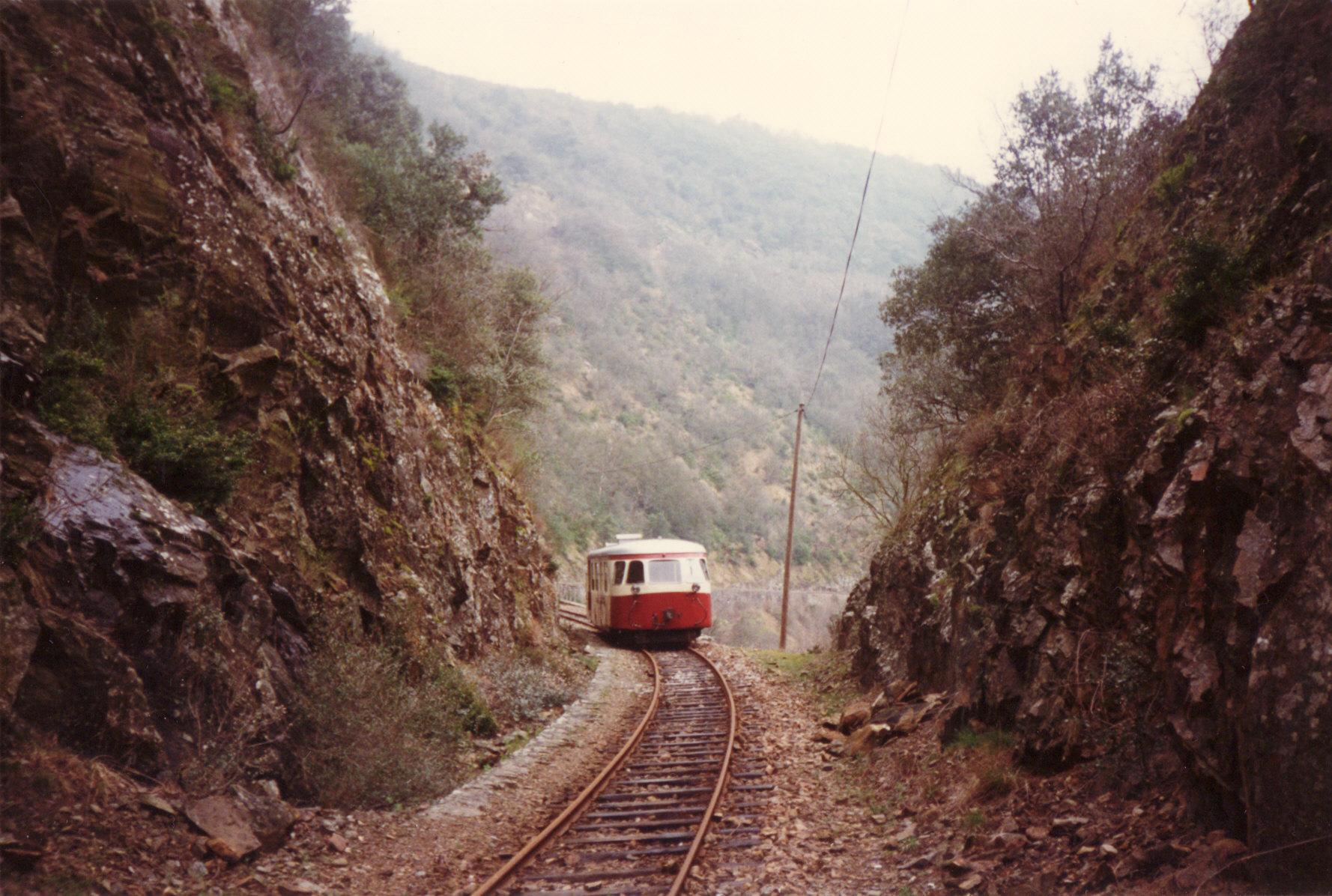
Billard railbus N° 314, type A 80D, from the Chemin de fer du Vivarais

Railbuses for numerous French VFIPs (secondary railways)

- Type A 80D,
- Type A 135D,
- Type A 150D,
- Type A 210D,
- Networks of the Compagnie des chemins de fer départementaux, including:
  - Corse,
  - Vivarais,
  - Indre et Loire,
  - Seine-et-Marne
- Tramways d'Ille-et-Vilaine Company
- Overseas networks:
  - Madagascar
  - Réunion
- French West Africa:
  - Dakar Niger
  - Dahomey
- Ethiopia:
  - Chemin de fer Franco-éthiopien received in 1964 two automotive cars of 550 horsepower (410 kW), for the Djibouti – Addis-Abeba line

Several European networks

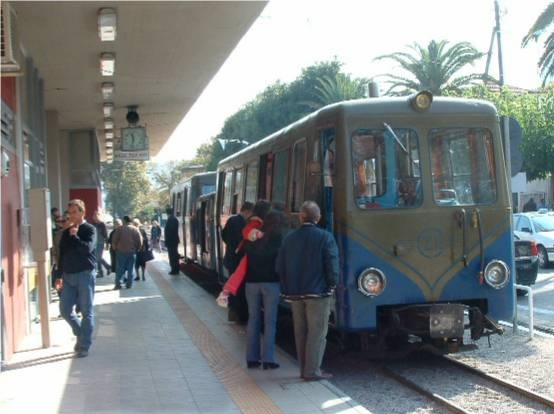
A Billard train for the Diakofto railway (Greece), made up of two cars with a motor van containing a generator to power the traction motors.

- In Greece
- In Spain
  - A Micheline was built in the 1930s for the PO
  - Three buses with bogies on a wide chassis worked on the Nord-Est.
  - A series of railbuses with two axles were built for the CFD and the SNCF in 1949 and 1950
  - A series of FNC railbuses were deployed by the SNCF

The solidity of the stock, and the simplicity of construction, means that many Billard engines are still working today.

== Preserved Billard rolling stock ==
Locomotives

type T 50

type T 75, in several variants (with the series prototype, and some military examples) on the Tacot des Lacs, at the Train Touristique de Saint Trojan and later at APPEVA.

type T 100,

Railcars

Meter gauge

type A 150D

- X153, Portes les Valence (bespoke).

type A 150D

- 212, Chemins de Fer de Provence
- 213, Chemin de fer du Vivarais
- 214, Chemin de fer du Vivarais.

type A 80D

- 313, Voies Ferrées du Velay
- 314, Chemin de fer du Vivarais
- 315 Voies Ferrées du Velay
- 316 Chemin de fer du Vivarais
- 513 Chemins de fer de Corse.

type A 150D2 Articulated

- 222 Voies Ferrées du Velay.

Trailer R 210

- 3, Chemin de fer du Vivarais
- 5, MTVS ex autorail AM 20 des TIV
- 7, Voies Ferrées du Velay
- 11, Chemin de fer du Vivarais
- 22, Chemin de fer du Vivarais

Standard gauge type A 75D

- X901, Tourist railway of La Sarthe, originally Chemin de fer Mamers-Saint Calais
- X903, Trains à vapeur de Touraine with a trailing car

=== Rebuilt and modernised vehicles ===
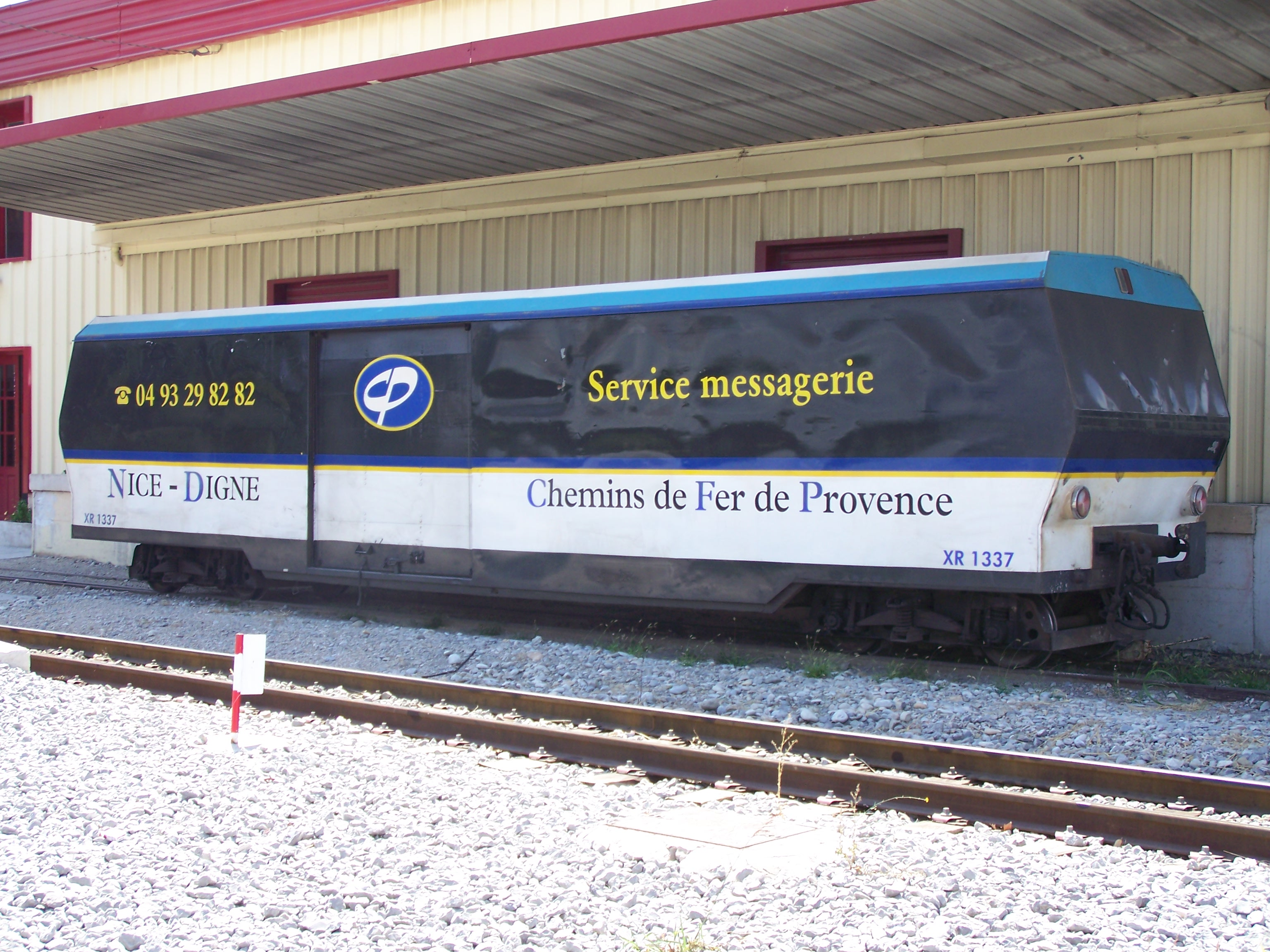
Trailing car X 1337 of the Chemins De Fer de Provence, rebuilt by Établissements Garnéro

- XR 1331 (Chemins de Fer de Provence), ex RL1, originally CP, rebuilt Garnero
- XRD 1333 (Chemins de Fer de Provence), ex RL3, originally CP, rebuilt original mail van
- XRD 1337 (Chemins de Fer de Provence), ex RL7, originally CFD Vivarais 33, rebuilt Garnero, mail van
- XR 113 (Chemins de fer de Corse) ex autorail A 150 D1, N°113, rebuilt Carde
- XR 104 (Chemins de fer de Corse) ex autorail A 210 D1, N°105, rebuilt Garnero, previously with CP
- XR 105 (Chemins de fer de Corse) ex autorail A 210 D1, N°106, rebuilt Garnero, previously with CP
- XRD 242 (Chemins de fer de Corse) ex autorail A 80 D, N°32, originally CFD Charentes
- XR 526 (Chemins de fer de Corse) ex autorail A 150 D2, N°526, originally Tramways d'Ille-et-Vilaine

== Gallery ==
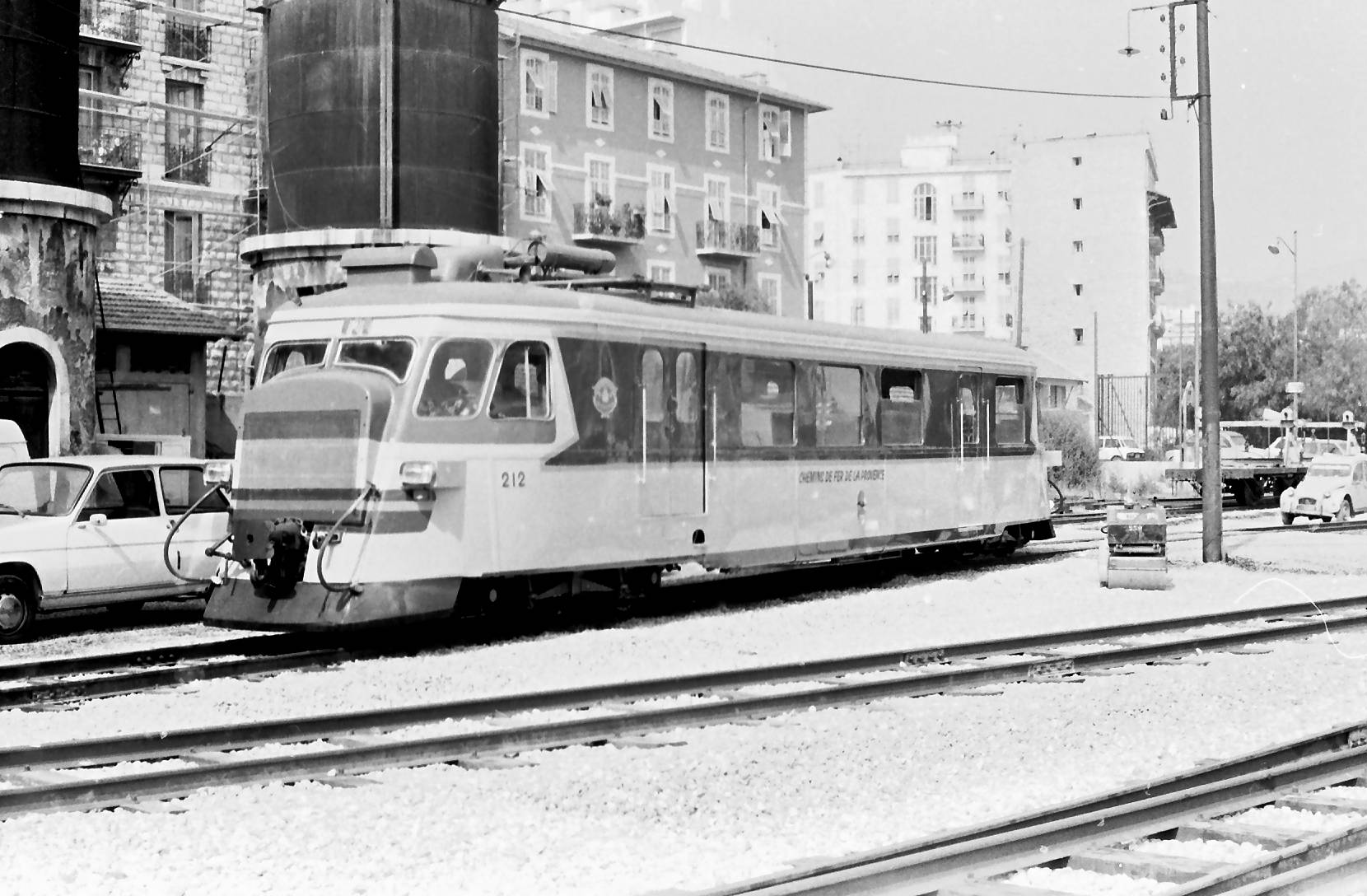
Railbus n° 212 (metre gauge) of the Chemins de Fer de Provence line at the Nice terminus, July 1983.

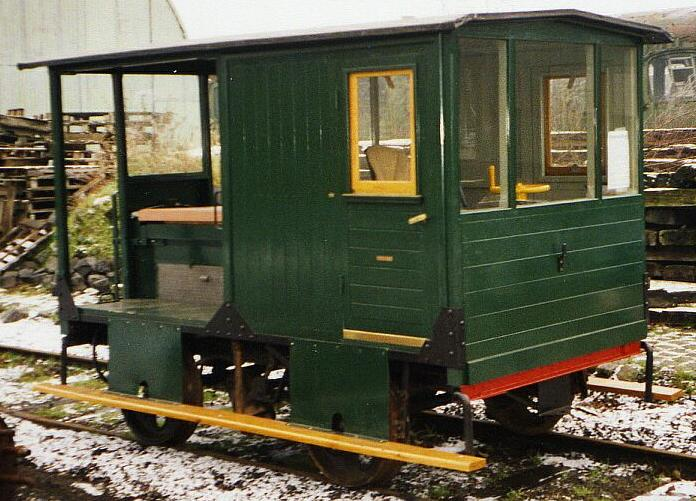
Billard Draisine, preserved at the Belgian "Dendermonde - Puurs"

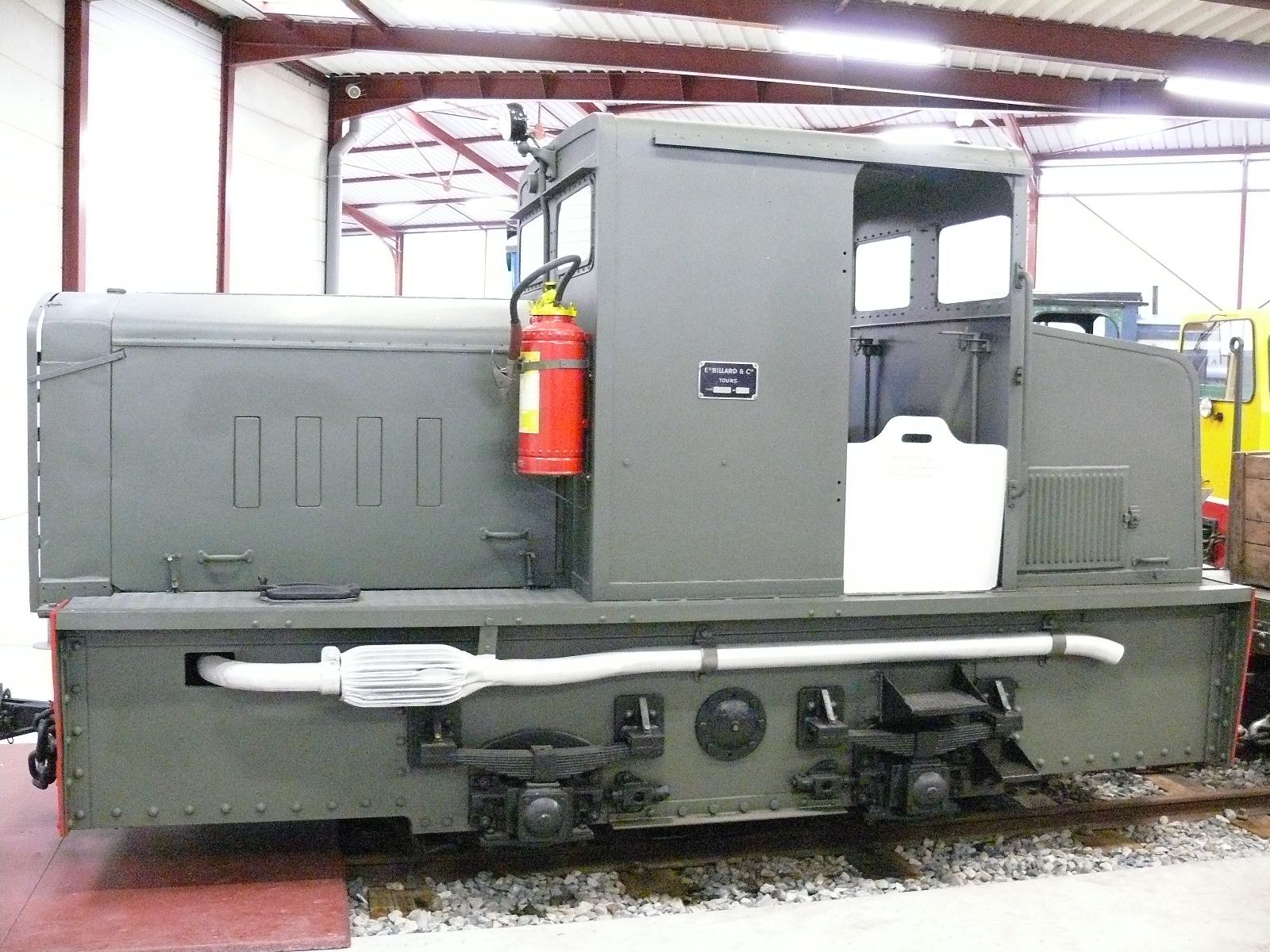
Locomotive type T75G N°232 preserved at the APPEVA museum (Chemin de fer de la Haute Somme), narrow gauge of 0.6 m (2 ft 0 in)

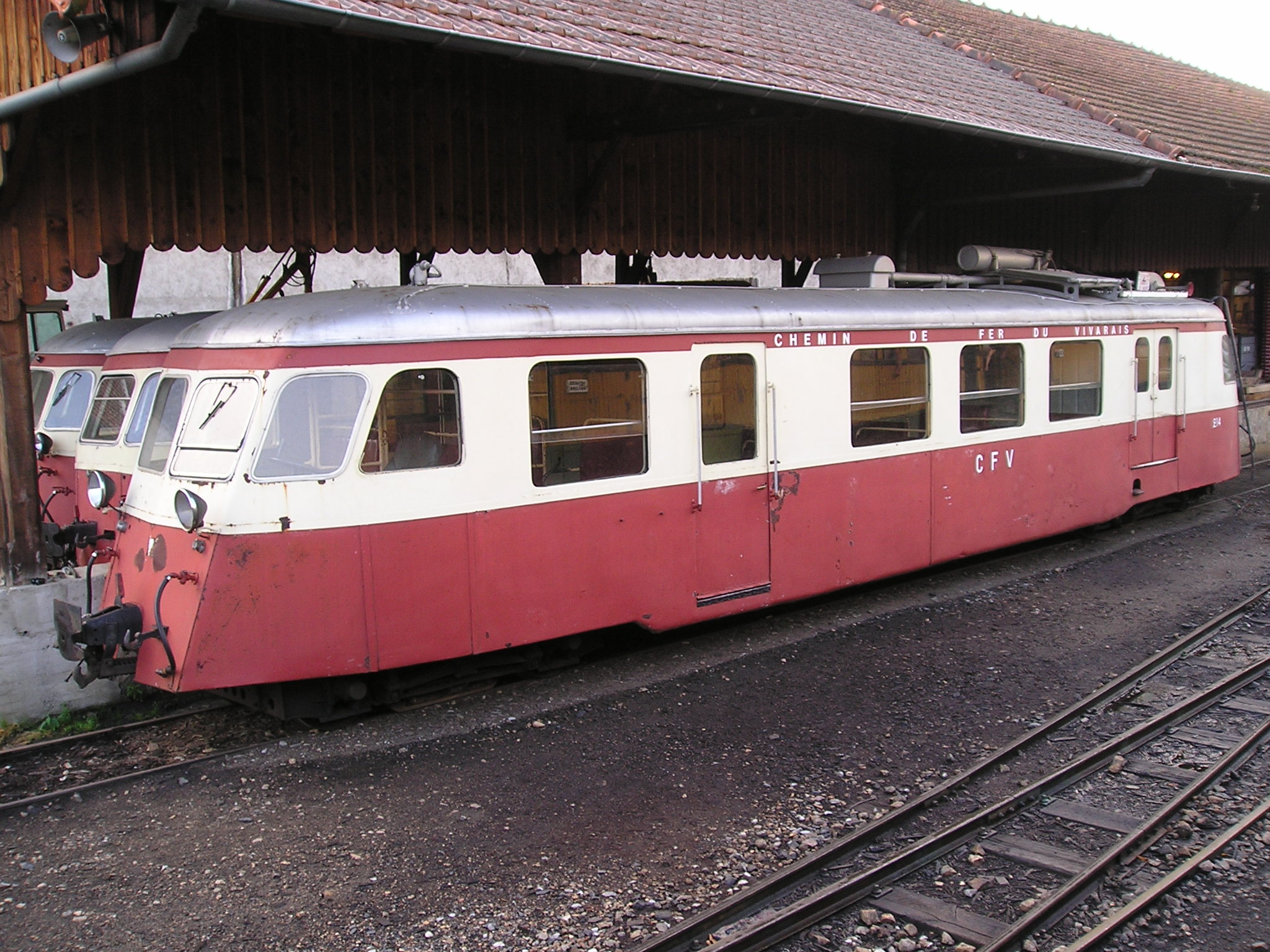
Railcar 214 preserved by the Chemin de fer du Vivarais, typical of many French secondary railways

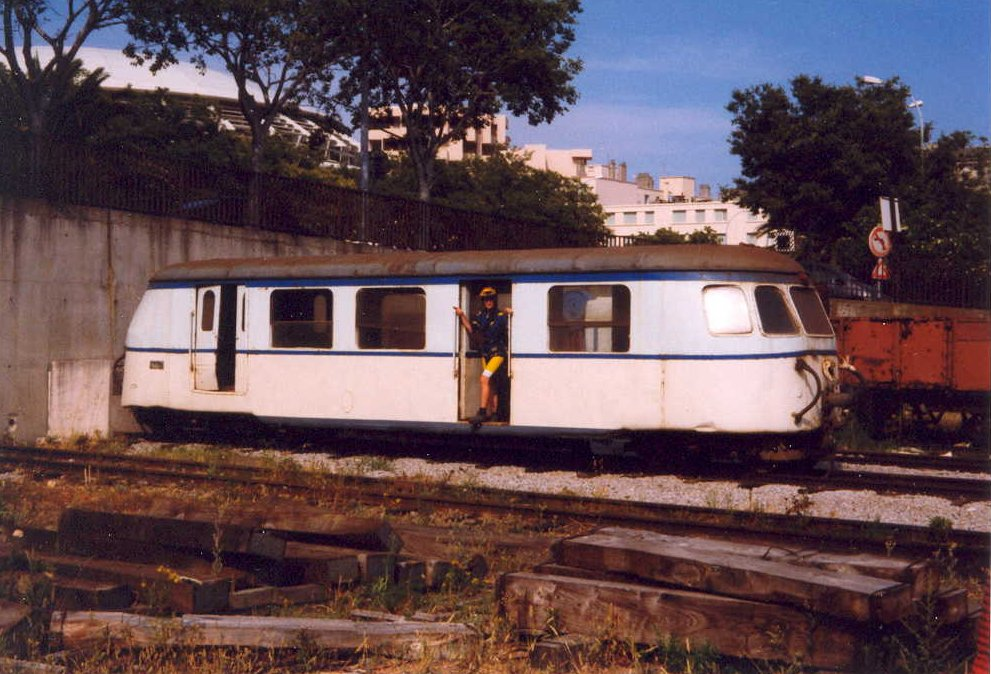
Trailing car XRD 242 from the Chemins de Fer Corse.

== Sources ==
- Riffaud, Jean-Claude (1982–1984). "Les automotrice Billard". Magazine des tramways à vapeur et des secondaires ("Steam tramways and secondary railways") (in French). 24.

== See also ==
- Chemin de fer du Vivarais
- Locomotive
- Metre gauge
- Railcar
- Socofer
