= Wee-wee =

The word wee-wee (or, alternatively, weewee) denotes an infantile euphemism for any of the following:

- Urine or the act of urination
- The human genital organs of either sex

== See also ==
- Oui Oui, a French pop music group
- Wiwi, for various phonetically similar terms
