= SNCF Class Y 7100 =

Class Y 7100
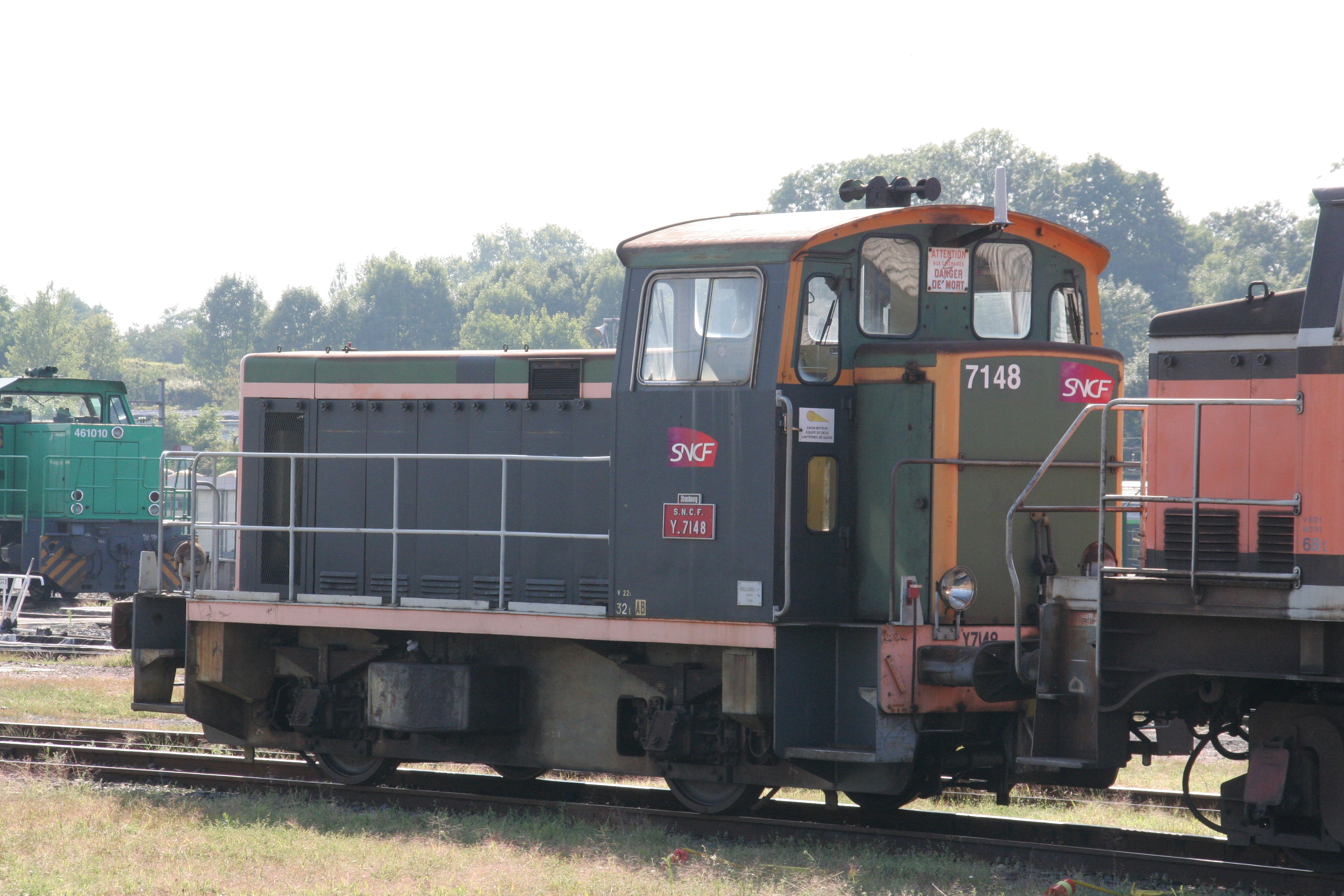
- Y 7148 at Strasbourg
Type and origin
- Power type: Diesel
- Builder: (France) Billard (France) Decauville
- Build date: 1958–1962
- Total produced: 210
Specifications
- Configuration
  - Whyte: 4wDH
  - UIC: B
- Gauge: 1,435 mm (4 ft 8 1/2 in) standard gauge
- Driver dia.: 1,050 mm (3 ft 5 in)
- Wheelbase: 3,685 mm (12 ft 1.1 in)
- Length: 9.94 m (32 ft 7 in)
- Loco weight: 32 tonnes (31 long tons; 35 short tons)
- Fuel type: Diesel
- Prime mover: Poyaud 6PYT
- Engine type: Diesel
- Transmission: Hydraulic
Performance figures
- Maximum speed: 54 km/h (34 mph)
- Power output: 150 kW (200 hp)
- Tractive effort: 73 kN (16,000 lb_{f})
Career
- Operators: SNCF
- Class: Y7100
- Numbers: Y7101–Y7310

The Y 7100 class of small shunters originally had 210 members. The first 130 were built by Billard, with the remaining 80 by Decauville. They have the 0-4-0 ("B") wheel arrangement, 150 kW diesel engines and hydraulic transmission. They can be found all over the French network.

Y 7192 was converted to mechanical transmission and renumbered as Y 7001. This locomotive was the prototype for the Y7400 class.

== Operators ==
In addition to SNCF, VLFI have purchased four Y 7100 locomotives (numbers 7172, 7200, 7214 & 7245) from SNCF. two further locos are recorded in use in the Port of Rouen (Grand port maritime de Rouen french).

Some of them are preserved by touristic railroads.
