= Maryland Route 662 =

State highway in Maryland, United States

Maryland Route 662
- Sections of MD 662 highlighted in red, from south to north: MD 662C, MD 662B, and MD 662

Route information
- Maintained by MDSHA
- Existed: 1948–present
- Tourist routes: Chesapeake Country Scenic Byway

Location
- Country: United States
- State: Maryland
- Counties: Talbot, Queen Anne's

Highway system
- Maryland highway system; Interstate; US; State; Scenic Byways
← MD 660	→ MD 665

Maryland Route 662 (MD 662) is a collection of state highways in the U.S. state of Maryland. These highways are sections of old alignment of U.S. Route 50 (US 50) between Easton and Wye Mills in Talbot County and Queen Anne's County. The three mainline sections of MD 662 pass through the villages of Longwoods, Skipton, and Wye Mills as they parallel US 50. The three main sections of MD 662 were designated in 1948 following the construction of US 50's bypasses of Easton and Wye Mills. MD 662C was extended south in Easton in the late 1990s.

== Route description ==
There are three mainline sections of MD 662:

- MD 662C runs 6.10 miles (9.82 km) from a dead end in Easton north to US 50 and MD 662B near Longwoods.
- MD 662B extends 2.16 miles (3.48 km) from US 50 and MD 662C near Longwoods north to US 50 at Skipton.
- MD 662 (without suffix) has a length of 4.43 miles (7.13 km) from US 50 near Skipton north to US 50 near Wye Mills.

=== Easton to Skipton ===
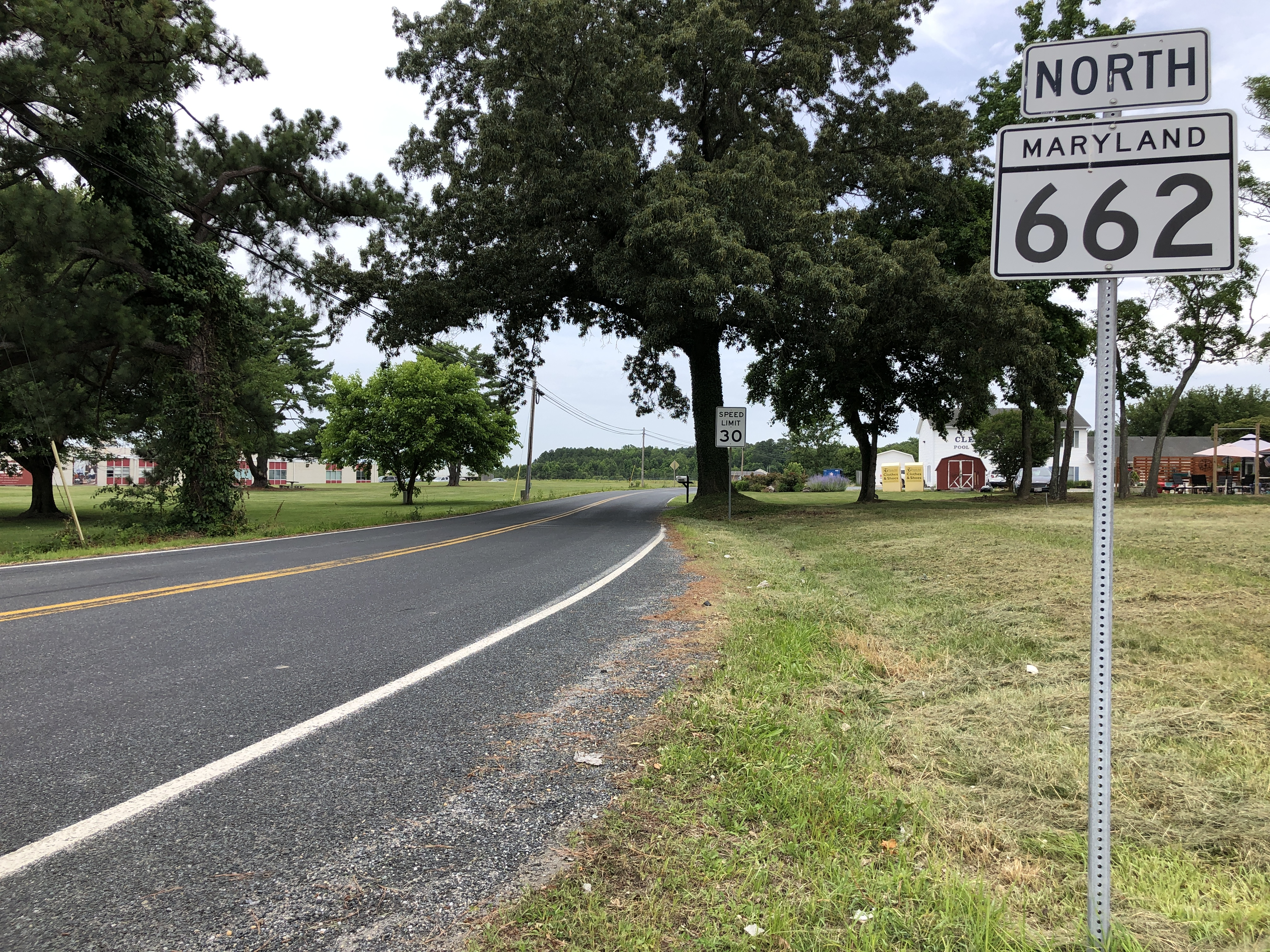
MD 662 northbound past Airpark Drive in Easton

Maryland Route 662C
- Location: Easton–Longwoods
- Length: 6.10 mi (9.82 km)
- Tourist routes: Chesapeake Country Scenic Byway

Maryland Route 662B
- Location: Longwoods–Skipton
- Length: 2.16 mi (3.48 km)
- Tourist routes: Chesapeake Country Scenic Byway

MD 662C begins as Centreville Road at a dead end in an industrial area adjacent to Easton Airport. The highway immediately intersects Airpark Drive (unsigned MD 322B), which is used to access MD 322 (Easton Parkway) and Washington Street, the main north–south street through the center of Easton. MD 662C continues north between US 50 on the east and the airport on the west. At the northeast corner of the airport property, the route intersects Airport Road, which provides access to the airport to the west and US 50 and MD 309 to the east. At that intersection, the state highway's name changes to Longwoods Road. After passing unsigned MD 662D, a connector to US 50, the highway veers away from US 50 through farmland, passing All Saints' Church. MD 662C crosses Potts Mill Creek before passing through the hamlet of Longwoods. After passing Probasco Landing Road, the state highway reaches its northern terminus at US 50 opposite the southern terminus of MD 662B. MD 662B heads northeast from its southern terminus at US 50 and MD 662C as Old Skipton Road. The highway passes between residences on large lots before entering a forested area and crossing Skipton Creek. The highway veers north and then northwest, crossing another creek and passing through the hamlet of Skipton before reaching its northern terminus at US 50.

=== Skipton to Wye Mills ===
Maryland Route 662
- Location: Skipton–Wye Mills
- Length: 4.43 mi (7.13 km)
- Tourist routes: Chesapeake Country Scenic Byway

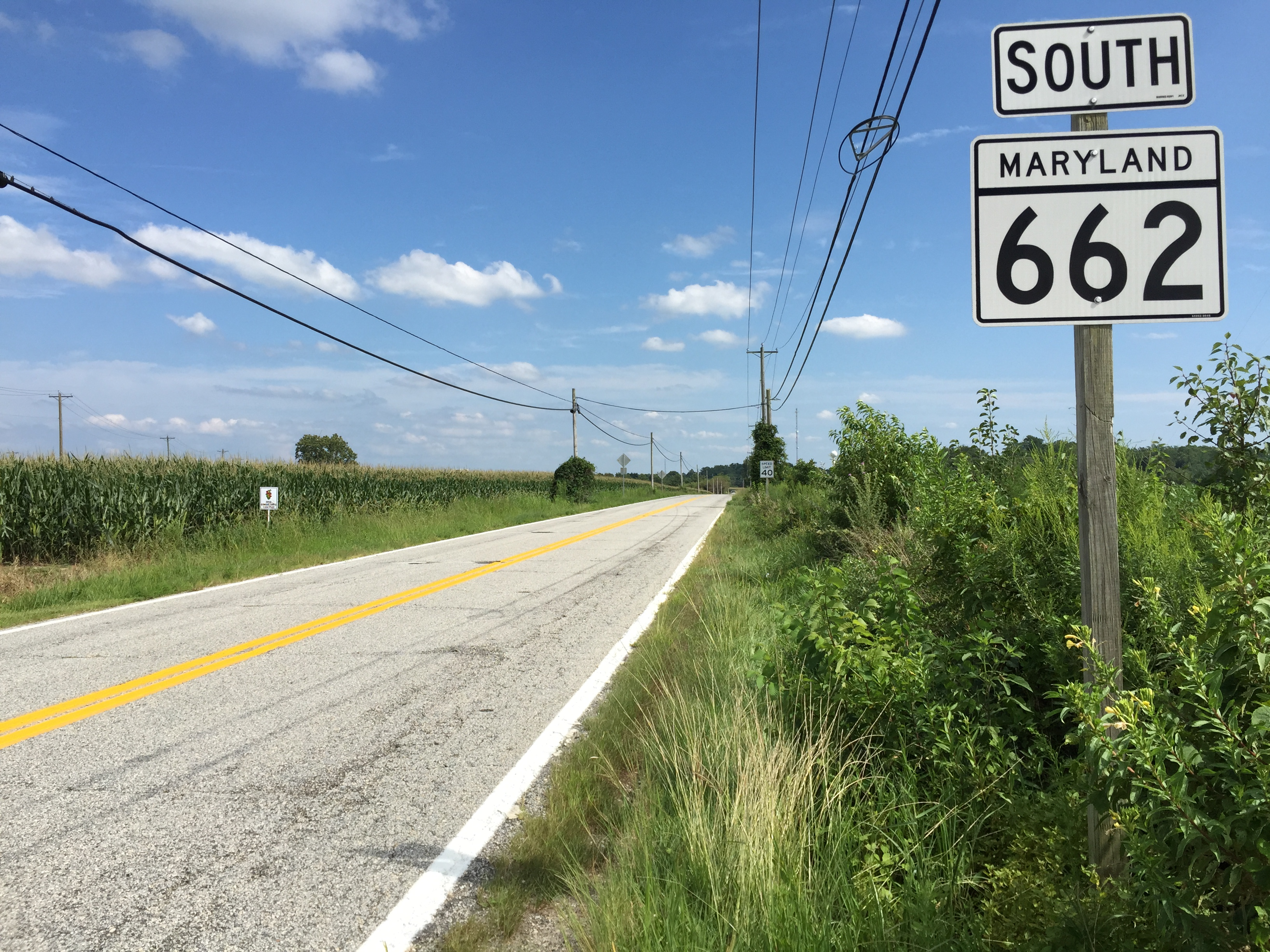
View south along MD 662 at US 50 near Wye Mills

MD 662 begins at US 50 as Old Wye Mills Road a short distance north of the northern terminus of MD 662B. MD 662 heads north and west, crossing Mill Creek, before turning north through a mix of residences and farmland. The state highway enters the unincorporated village of Wye Mills, where it passes Old Wye Church and Wye Oak State Park, which contains the remains of the Wye Oak. MD 662 meets the west end of MD 404 (Queen Annes Highway) next to the Wye Mill before crossing the Wye East River, a tributary of the Wye River, and entering Queen Anne's County. MD 213 (College Drive) splits to the north as MD 662, now named Wye Mills Road, veers to the northwest. MD 662 passes Chesapeake College before reaching its northern terminus at US 50.

== History ==
The three mainline sections of MD 662 comprise the original alignment of US 213 from Easton to Wye Mills and of MD 404 north of Wye Mills. MD 662 was assigned in 1948 to those segments when Easton and Wye Mills were bypassed with a straighter highway that in 1949 became part of an extended US 50. MD 662C's southern terminus was originally north of Airport Road where it merged with US 50. MD 662C was extended south parallel to US 50 by 1999. MD 662A has existed since at least 1999, while MD 662D was assigned in 2009.

== Junction list ==
=== MD 662C and MD 662B ===
MD 662C and MD 662B are entirely in Talbot County.

Location	mi	km	Destinations	Notes
Easton	0.00	0.00	Dead end	Southern terminus of MD 662C
Easton	0.02	0.032	Airpark Drive to MD 322 (Easton Parkway) / US 50 / Washington Street	Airpark Drive east is unsigned MD 322B
Easton	1.30	2.09	Airport Road to US 50 / MD 309	
Easton	1.50	2.41	To US 50	Connector is unsigned MD 662D
Longwoods	6.10 0.00	9.82 0.00	US 50 (Ocean Gateway) – Easton, Bay Bridge	Northern terminus of MD 662C; southern terminus of MD 662B
Skipton	2.16	3.48	US 50 (Ocean Gateway) – Easton, Bay Bridge	Northern terminus of MD 662B
1.000 mi = 1.609 km; 1.000 km = 0.621 mi

=== MD 662 ===
County	Location	mi	km	Destinations	Notes
Talbot	Skipton	0.00	0.00	US 50 (Ocean Gateway) – Easton, Bay Bridge	Southern terminus of MD 662
Talbot–Queen Anne's county line	Wye Mills	2.98	4.80	MD 404 east (Queen Annes Highway) – Queen Anne, Denton	Western terminus of MD 404
Queen Anne's	Wye Mills	3.11	5.01	MD 213 north (College Drive) – Bay Bridge, Centreville	Southern terminus of MD 213
Queen Anne's		4.43	7.13	US 50 (Ocean Gateway) – Easton, Bay Bridge	Northern terminus of MD 662
1.000 mi = 1.609 km; 1.000 km = 0.621 mi

== Auxiliary routes ==
MD 662 has four auxiliary routes:

- MD 662A is the designation for the 0.08-mile (0.13 km) one-lane ramp from eastbound US 50 to southbound MD 662 at MD 662's northern terminus near Wye Mills.
- MD 662D is the designation for the two-way 0.04-mile (0.064 km) connector between MD 662C and US 50 just north of Easton Airport.
