= Wye =

Wye may refer to:

== Place names ==
=== Australia ===
- Wye, South Australia, a locality on South Australia's Limestone Coast

=== Britain ===
- Wye, Kent, a village in the parish of Wye with Hinxhill, Kent
  - Wye College, agricultural college, part of University of London before closure in 2009
  - Wye School, a free school
  - Wye railway station, with station code WYE
  - Wye Racecourse, a former horse racing venue
  - RAF Wye, a former aerodrome
- Wye Head, an area near Buxton, Derbyshire and a major rising of the Derbyshire Wye

=== Canada ===
- Wye Marsh, a wetland area on the south shores of Georgian Bay in Ontario
- Wye Road, Strathcona County, Alberta

=== United States ===
- Wye, Montana, a town in Missoula County, Montana
- Wye Mills, Maryland, an unincorporated community in Talbot County, Maryland
  - Wye Mill, the oldest grist mill in the United States
  - The Wye Oak was the largest white oak tree in the United States
- Wye House, a large Southern frame plantation house in Talbot County, Maryland
- Wye Hall, a historic house in Queen Anne's County, Maryland
- Wye Mountain, a ridge in Perry and Pulaski counties, Arkansas

=== Other ===
- Wye, a fictional province in Isaac Asimov's Foundation series

== People ==
=== Wye as a surname ===
- Sam Wye, born 2000, New Zealand rugby union player
- Trevor Wye, born 1935, English flautist

=== Wye as a given name ===
- Wye Jamison Allanbrook, 1943–2010, American musicologist
- Wye Saltonstall, baptised 1602–after 1640, English translator and poet.

== Other uses ==
- The name of the letter y
- HMS Wye, five ships of the Royal Navy named after the River Wye
- Wye level, an early optical level
- Wye (rail), a term used in North American railroading equivalent to an English railway triangle
- Wye fitting, used in piping and plumbing
- Wye connection, used in three-phase electrical circuits
- Wye interchange, or directional T interchange between two or more roads or highways
- Common name for Escumasia, a Carboniferous fossil animal

== See also ==
- River Wye (disambiguation)
- Wye Bridge (disambiguation)
- Wye station (disambiguation)
- Why (disambiguation)
- Y (disambiguation)
