= Why =

Why most often refers to:

- Causality, a consequential relationship between two or more events
- Reason (argument), a premise in support of an argument, for what reason or purpose
- Grounding (metaphysics), a topic in metaphysics regarding how things exist in virtue of more fundamental things
- Why?, one of the Five Ws used in journalism

Why may also refer to:

== Music ==
=== Artists ===
- Why? (American band), a hip hop/indie rock band formed in Oakland, California, in 2004
  - Yoni Wolf, formerly known by the stage name Why?
- Why (Canadian band), a rock band formed in Winnipeg, Manitoba, in 1993
- Why?, a 1990s UK folk band, two members of which formed Quench in 2001

=== Albums ===
- Why (Baby V.O.X album) or the title song, 2000
- Why? (Ginger Baker album) or the title song, 2014
- Why (Prudence Liew album) or the title song, 1987
- Why? (They Might Be Giants album), 2015
- Why?, by Jacob Whitesides, 2016
- Why, by Moahni Moahna, 1996
- Why?, by the MonaLisa Twins, 2022

=== EPs ===
- Why (Discharge EP) or the title song, 1981
- Why (Taeyeon EP) or the title song (see below), 2016
- Why.., 2023, by BoyNextDoor

=== Songs ===
- "Why" (3T song) featuring Michael Jackson, 1996
- "Why" (Andy Gibb song), 1978
- "Why" (Annie Lennox song), 1992; covered by DJ Sammy (2005)
- "Why?" (Bronski Beat song), 1984
- "Why" (The Byrds song), 1966
- "Why" (Carly Simon song), 1982
- "Why" (D Mob song) with Cathy Dennis, 1994
- "Why?" (Earth, Wind & Fire song), 2015
- "Why" (Frankie Avalon song), 1959; covered by Anthony Newley (1960) and Donny Osmond (1972)
- "Why" (Gabrielle song), 2007
- "Why" (Glamma Kid song), 1999
- "Why" (Gen Hoshino song), 2023
- "Why" (Jadakiss song), 2004
- "Why" (Jason Aldean song), 2005
- "Why" (Jieqiong song), 2018
- "Why" (Lionel Richie song), 2006
- "Why?" (Marika Gombitová song), 1979
- "Why" (Mary J. Blige song) featuring Rick Ross, 2012
- "Why" (Miliyah Kato song), 2009
- "Why?" (Mis-Teeq song), 2001
- "Why" (NF song), 2018
- "Why" (Rascal Flatts song), 2009
- "Why" (Sabrina Carpenter song), 2017
- "Why" (Sonique song), 2005
- "Why?" (Stray Kids song), 2024
- "Why" (Taeyeon song), 2016
- "Why" (Tony Sheridan song) with the Beatles, 1964
- "Why" (Yoko Ono song), 1970
- "Why? (Keep Your Head Down)", by TVXQ, 2011
- "Why (Must We Fall in Love)", by Diana Ross & the Supremes and the Temptations, 1970
- "Why, Why", by Carl Smith, 1957
- "Why", by 4Minute from Best of 4Minute, 2012
- "Why", by Air Supply from Mumbo Jumbo, 2010
- "Why?", by Aminé from OnePointFive, 2018
- "Why", by Anastacia from Evolution, 2017
- "Why", by Antique from Die for You, 2001
- "Why", by Average White Band from Cut the Cake, 1975
- "Why" by Avril Lavigne, a B-side of the single "Complicated", 2002
- "Why", by Ayaka from the single "Clap & Love"/"Why" and the theme song of the PSP game Crisis Core: Final Fantasy VII, 2007
- "Why?", by Bazzi from Cosmic, 2018
- "Why", by Basshunter from Bass Generation, 2009
- "Why", by Busted from A Present for Everyone, 2003
- "Why", by Crossfade from Falling Away, 2006
- "Why?", by Des'ree from Dream Soldier, 2003
- "Why", by Dominic Fike from What Could Possibly Go Wrong, 2020
- "Why! ...", by Enigma from Le Roi Est Mort, Vive Le Roi!, 1996
- "Why", by Fleetwood Mac from Mystery to Me, 1973
- "Why", by Frankie Valli from Closeup, 1975
- "Why?", by Geir Rönning, representing Finland in the Eurovision Song Contest 2005
- "Why", by Godsmack from Awake, 2000
- "Why", by Gotthard from Silver, 2017
- "Why?", by Helloween from Master of the Rings, 1994
- "Why", by Irene Cara from Anyone Can See, 1982
- "Why", by Jamie Walters from Jamie Walters, 1994
- "Why", by Jocelyn Enriquez from All My Life, 2003
- "Why", by Joe Satriani from The Extremist, 1992
- "Why", by Kep1er from Lovestruck!, 2023
- "Why", by Lily Allen a B-side of the single Not Fair, 2009
- "Why", by Limp Bizkit from Greatest Hitz, 2005
- "Why", by the Linda Lindas from Growing Up, 2022
- "Why?", by Lonnie Mack from The Wham of that Memphis Man, 1963
- "Why", by Mario from Go!, 2007
- "Why", by Melanie Chisholm from Northern Star, 1999
- "Why", by Natalie Imbruglia from Left of the Middle, 1997
- "Why", by Ne-Yo from Non-Fiction, 2015
- "Why?", by Reset, 1997
- "Why", by Rooney, 2016
- "Why", by Roy Woods from Waking at Dawn, 2016
- "Why?", by Secondhand Serenade from A Twist In My Story, 2008
- "Why", by Shawn Mendes from Shawn Mendes, 2018
- "Why?", by the Specials, a B-side of the single "Ghost Town", 1981
- "Why", by Stabbing Westward from Wither Blister Burn & Peel, 1996
- "Why", by Swift from Thoughts Are Thought, 1999
- "Why?", by Tracy Chapman from Tracy Chapman, 1988
- "Why", by Uriah Heep, a B-side of the single "The Wizard", 1972
- "Why?", by Vanilla Ninja from Vanilla Ninja, 2003
- "Why", by Wide Mouth Mason from Where I Started, 1999
- "Why?", by Z-Ro from The Life of Joseph W. McVey, 2004
- "Why", written by Buddy Feyne, notably performed by Nat King Cole, 1954
- "Why", from the musical Tick, tick... BOOM!, 2001
- "Why", from the television series Fraggle Rock
- "Why? (The King of Love Is Dead)", by Nina Simone from 'Nuff Said!, 1968
- "Why (What's Goin' On?)", by the Roots from The Tipping Point, 2004
- "Why Why", by Doja Cat from Planet Her, 2021

== Other media ==
- Why (board game), a game based on the television series Alfred Hitchcock Presents
- Why? (film), a 1987 Czech film
- Why? (1971 film), a 1971 short starring O. J. Simpson and Tim Buckley
- Why?, the 6th book in the series 26 Fairmount Avenue by Tomie dePaola
- "Why?" (As Time Goes By), a 1993 television episode
- Why? with Hannibal Buress, a Comedy Central television series
- Why?, a book by Indian science writer Sukanya Datta

== People ==
- Alby Why (1899–1969), Australian rugby league footballer
- Jack Why (1903–1944), Australian rugby league footballer

== Places ==
- Why, Arizona, an unincorporated community in the US
- Why, Lakes, South Sudan

== Other uses ==
- Why? Group, New York-based anarchist circle in the 1940s and 1950s
- Why the lucky stiff, or simply why or _why, a computer programmer and artist
- Whyteleafe railway station, Surrey, National Rail station code
- World Hunger Year (WHY), a charity organization
- Why?, a satirical wiki and subproject of Uncyclopedia

== See also ==
- Wai (disambiguation)
- Why Why Why (disambiguation)
- Wye (disambiguation)
- Y (disambiguation)
