= 1995 heat wave =

1995 heat wave may refer to:

- 1995 Chicago heat wave (July)
- 1995 British Isles heat wave (July–August)
