= River Wye (disambiguation) =

The River Wye is the fourth-longest river in the UK and forms part of the border between England and Wales.

River Wye or Wye River may also refer to:

Rivers:

- River Wye, Derbyshire, a river flowing from Axe Edge Moor, Buxton to the River Derwent
- River Wye, Buckinghamshire, a river flowing from the Chiltern Hills in Buckinghamshire down to Bourne End where it meets the Thames
- Wye River (Maryland), a tributary of the Chesapeake Bay, on the Eastern Shore of Maryland, United States
- Wye River (New Zealand), a minor river in the South Island of New Zealand
- Wye River (Tasmania), a river of Tasmania, Australia
- Wye River (Victoria), a minor river in Victoria, Australia

Settlements:

- Wye River, Victoria, a tourist village on the west coast of Victoria, Australia

Other:

- Wye River Memorandum, a political agreement between Israel and the Palestinian Authority concluded at the Aspen Institute Wye River Conference Centers in Maryland

== See also ==
- Wye (disambiguation)
