= 1995 British Isles heatwave =

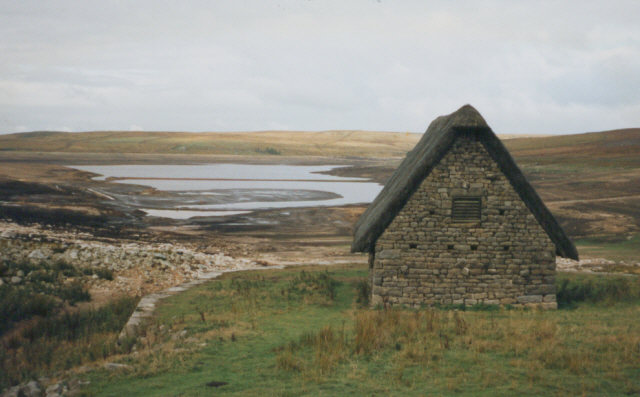
- Grimwith Reservoir at a low level during the 1995 drought

Meteorological history
- Duration: 28 June - 22 August 1995
- Heat event
- Max temp: 35.2 °C (95.4 °F), recorded at Boxworth, Cambridgeshire

Overall effects
- Areas affected: United Kingdom and Ireland

A heatwave occurred across the UK and Ireland between late July and late August. It was part of one of the warmest and driest summers recorded in the UK, as well as one of the warmest Augusts ever recorded in many locations around the UK. Until 2025, it was the hottest summer ever recorded in Ireland. Many weather stations recorded the summer of 1995 as drier than, or comparable with, the summer of 1976. Ireland was also widely affected by the heatwave with temperatures reaching over 30 °C (86 °F) in many locations, as well as exceptionally low rainfall throughout the summer.

== United Kingdom ==
In the United Kingdom, the heat wave of 1995 currently marks the warmest August on record, and the fourth-warmest summer overall, behind 1976, 1826 and 2025. The CET Central England station recorded a daily mean temperature of 19.2 °C (66.6 °F) and a mean daily maximum temperature of 25.1 °C (77.2 °F) in August, and a daily mean temperature of 17.37 °C (63.27 °F) for the entire summer.

Before the heatwave formed, a mini-heatwave occurred between 28 and 30 June, with a highest temperature recorded during this short period of 33.8 °C (92.8 °F) recorded on 30 June 1995 at Barbourne, Worcester. Low rainfall was also widely recorded around the nation during the month of June, many stations reporting less than 50% of its average rainfall, with some locations reporting less than 20%.

Station	County / UA	June 1995 rainfall amount
Armagh	County Armagh	28.9 millimetres (1.14 in)
Bradford Lister Park	West Yorkshire	11.0 millimetres (0.43 in)
Cardiff Bute Park	Cardiff	08.9 millimetres (0.35 in)
Durham	County Durham	16.2 millimetres (0.64 in)
Heathrow	Greater London	12.0 millimetres (0.47 in)
Ringway	Greater Manchester	27.9 millimetres (1.10 in)
Shawbury	Shropshire	13.2 millimetres (0.52 in)
Sheffield	South Yorkshire	11.3 millimetres (0.44 in)
Southampton	Southampton	11.2 millimetres (0.44 in)
Sutton Bonington	Nottinghamshire	11.7 millimetres (0.46 in)
Waddington	Lincolnshire	17.8 millimetres (0.70 in)
Whitby	North Yorkshire	25.6 millimetres (1.01 in)
Yeovilton	Somerset	10.8 millimetres (0.43 in)

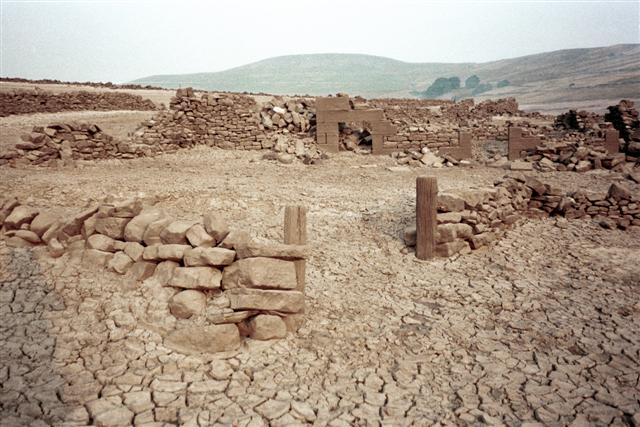
Ruined buildings on the bed of Scar House Reservoir, revealed during August 1995

July 1995 then continued the hot weather, with an average daily temperature of 18.6 °C (65.5 °F) meaning that it is the seventh-warmest July in the CET records back to 1659. It was very dry too, with most places recording less than 30% of average rainfall. Days frequently reached above 30 °C (86 °F), culminating at 33 °C (91 °F) on the 31st. Higher temperatures were recorded in August, though.

During the heatwave, many locations around the UK recorded peak temperatures at the start of August. The highest temperature recorded during the heatwave was 35.2 °C (95.4 °F) recorded on 1 August 1995 at Boxworth, Cambridgeshire. After this, most of the United Kingdom was still under warm temperatures around or above 25 °C (77 °F), until temperatures rose again as high as 33.8 °C (92.8 °F) which was recorded at Barbourne, Worcester. Toward the end of the hot spell, temperatures rose up to 30 °C (86 °F) in many parts of the country. Cheltenham in Gloucestershire recorded three consecutive days above 32 °C (90 °F) from 20 to 22 August, with the highest temperature at 33.6 °C (92.5 °F) on 22 August.

Much of the United Kingdom suffered drought conditions during August, with most parts of the UK recording less than 30% of its average rainfall, and most parts of England less than 20%. Many weather stations around the United Kingdom recorded no days of rain to the value of ≥ 1.0 mm.

Station	County / UA	August 1995 rainfall amount
Aberporth	Ceredigion	07.8 millimetres (0.31 in)
Armagh	County Armagh	10.4 millimetres (0.41 in)
Ballypatrick Forest	County Antrim	25.2 millimetres (0.99 in)
Bradford Lister Park	West Yorkshire	06.7 millimetres (0.26 in)
Braemar	Aberdeenshire	20.3 millimetres (0.80 in)
Camborne	Cornwall	19.0 millimetres (0.75 in)
Cambridge NIAB	Cambridgeshire	05.3 millimetres (0.21 in)
Cardiff Bute Park	Cardiff	09.2 millimetres (0.36 in)
Chivenor	Devon	16.8 millimetres (0.66 in)
Cwmystwyth	Ceredigion	24.3 millimetres (0.96 in)
Dunstaffnage	Argyll and Bute	26.5 millimetres (1.04 in)
Durham	County Durham	14.2 millimetres (0.56 in)
Eastbourne	East Sussex	00.7 millimetres (0.028 in)
Eskdalemuir	Dumfries and Galloway	24.3 millimetres (0.96 in)
Heathrow	Greater London	00.3 millimetres (0.012 in)
Hurn	Dorset	04.7 millimetres (0.19 in)
Lerwick	Shetland	49.5 millimetres (1.95 in)
Leuchars	Fife	11.2 millimetres (0.44 in)
Lowestoft	Suffolk	17.6 millimetres (0.69 in)
Manston	Kent	13.9 millimetres (0.55 in)
Nairn	Highland	15.4 millimetres (0.61 in)
Newton Rigg	Cumbria	10.9 millimetres (0.43 in)
Oxford	Oxfordshire	04.4 millimetres (0.17 in)
Paisley	Renfrewshire	22.1 millimetres (0.87 in)
Ringway	Greater Manchester	17.7 millimetres (0.70 in)
Ross-on-Wye	Herefordshire	06.2 millimetres (0.24 in)
Shawbury	Shropshire	07.8 millimetres (0.31 in)
Sheffield	South Yorkshire	12.1 millimetres (0.48 in)
Southampton	Southampton	04.6 millimetres (0.18 in)
Stornoway Airport	Na h-Eileanan Siar	32.2 millimetres (1.27 in)
Sutton Bonington	Nottinghamshire	05.7 millimetres (0.22 in)
Tiree	Argyll and Bute	33.8 millimetres (1.33 in)
Valley	Anglesey	11.1 millimetres (0.44 in)
Waddington	Lincolnshire	05.9 millimetres (0.23 in)
Whitby	North Yorkshire	03.4 millimetres (0.13 in)
Wick Airport	Highland	16.8 millimetres (0.66 in)
Yeovilton	Somerset	17.4 millimetres (0.69 in)

=== Aftermath ===
After the heat wave ended in August, the east and south of the United Kingdom received high rainfall in September, but another dry spell occurred mainly in the east of the UK. For the rest of 1995, most of the UK received below-average rainfall. Temperatures after the heatwave remained around average for the rest of the year (with further unseasonably warm weather in October), except for a record-breaking cold spell from Christmas to New Year.

== Ireland ==
Stations with highest temperature during August 1995

While temperatures were lower, Ireland experienced a similar weather pattern to that of the United Kingdom during the summer of 1995.

The Valentia Observatory and the weather station at Phoenix Park both recorded a daily mean temperature of 16.6 °C (61.9 °F), and it was the warmest summer for over a century.

Kilkenny recorded a total of 27 days with temperatures over 25 °C (77 °F) during the heat wave, compared to the 2.5 days that the town usually records, and was one of the hottest parts of the country during the heatwave, recording a maximum temperature of 30.8 °C (87.4 °F). Like the United Kingdom, Ireland received exceptionally low rainfall, and it was the driest summer on record for the weather stations at Malin Head, Casement Aerodrome and Cork Airport. The overall rainfall recorded during the summer at Phoenix Park was only 65.1 millimetres (2.56 in).

The highest temperature recorded during the heatwave was 31.5 °C (88.7 °F) and was measured at Oak Park in County Carlow on 2 August.

County	Station	August 1995 maximum temperature	Date
Carlow	Oak Park	31.5 °C (88.7 °F)	2
Clare	Shannon Airport	29.8 °C (85.6 °F)	17
Cork	Cork Airport	28.0 °C (82.4 °F)	3
Kilkenny	Kilkenny	30.8 °C (87.4 °F)	2
Offaly	Birr	29.4 °C (84.9 °F)	17 / 18

=== Impacts ===
Ireland experienced drought conditions throughout the summer, which caused problems to potato farmers in rural areas, as they had difficulty watering crops due to water shortages. Several areas around Ireland were also issued with hosepipe bans, and residents were asked not to hose lawns due to drought conditions.

Summer 1995 also saw, and still holds the record for the amount of days over 30 °C (86 °F) in one year in Ireland with at least 10 distinct days.
