= Wye River (Victoria) =

Perennial river in Victoria, Australia

Wye
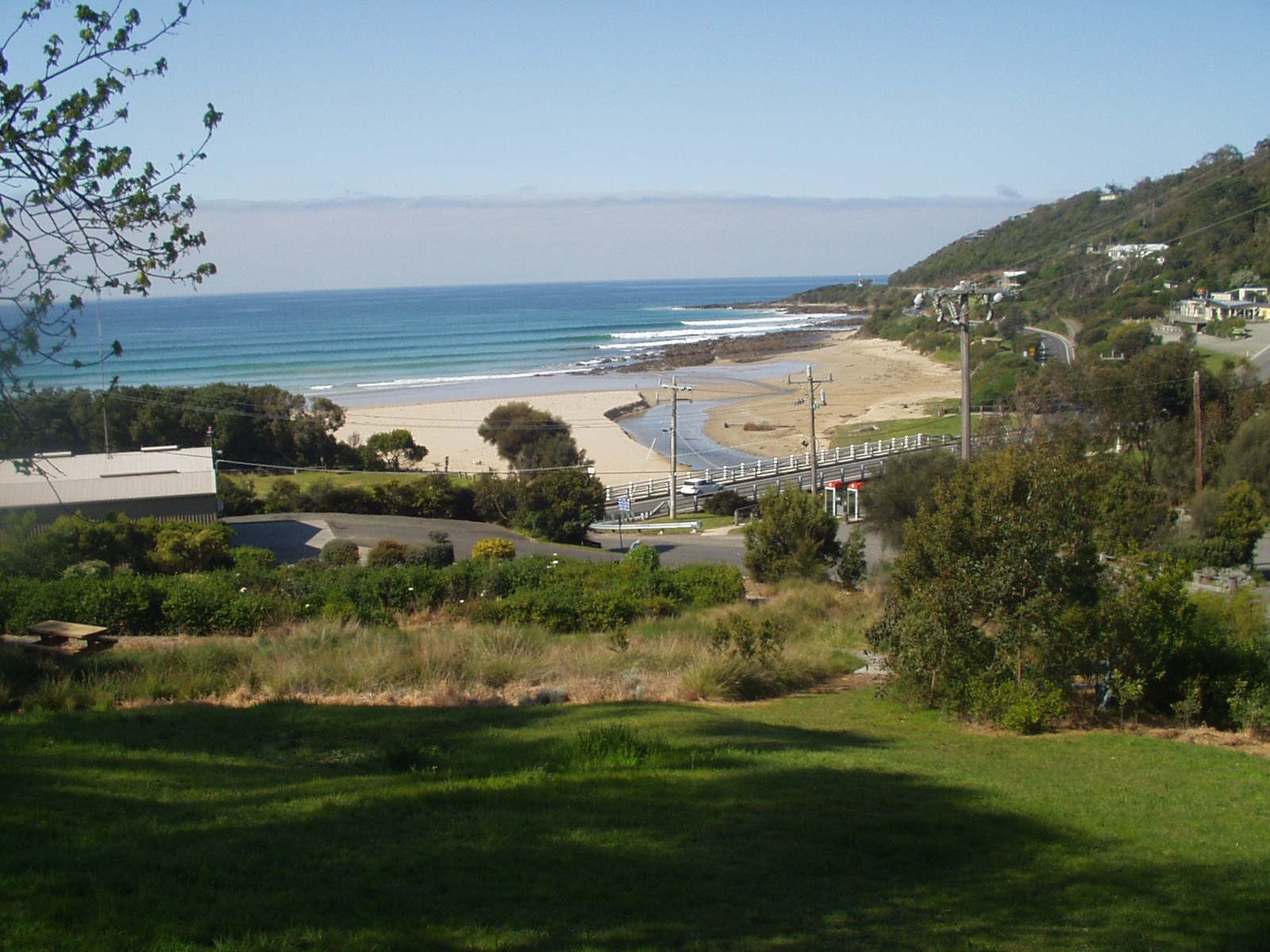
- The estuary of the Wye

- Location of the Wye River mouth in Victoria
- Etymology: River Wye

Location
- Country: Australia
- State: Victoria
- Region: South East Coastal Plain (IBRA), The Otways
- LGA: Colac Otway Shire

Physical characteristics
- Source: Otway Ranges
  - coordinates: 38°36′3″S 143°47′44″E
  - elevation: 601 m (1,972 ft)
- Mouth: Bass Strait
  - location: Wye River (town)
  - coordinates: 38°37′49″S 143°50′48″E
  - elevation: 0 m (0 ft)
- Length: 11 km (6.8 mi)

Basin features
- River system: Corangamite catchment
- National park: Great Otway National Park

The Wye River is a perennial river of the Corangamite catchment, in the Otways region of the Australian state of Victoria.

== Location and features ==
The Wye River rises in the Otway Ranges in southwest Victoria and flows generally east towards the town of Wye River where the river reaches its mouth and empties into Bass Strait, north of Cape Otway. From its highest point, the river descends 601 metres (1,972 ft) over its 11-kilometre (6.8 mi) course.

== Etymology ==
The river was named by surveyor George Smythe and is derived from one of the rivers of the same name in the United Kingdom.

== See also ==
- List of rivers of Australia § Victoria
