= Triangle station =

Triangle station can refer to a station located at a wye or triangular junction.

Triangle station may also refer to:

- Triangle railway station, a station near Triangle, West Yorkshire, England
- Federal Triangle station, a metro station in Washington, D.C., United States
- Golden Triangle station, a planned light rail station in Eden Prairie (Minneapolis–Saint Paul area), Minnesota, United States
- Winnersh Triangle railway station, a station in Winnersh, Berkshire, England

== See also ==
- Trianglen Station, in Copenhagen, Denmark
- Triangeln railway station, in Malmö, Sweden
- Wye station (disambiguation)
