= Why Why Why =

Why Why Why may refer to:

- "Why Why Why" (The Kelly Family song), 1995
- "Why Why Why" (Shawn Mendes song), 2024
- "Why, Why, Why", a song by Billy Currington, 2006
- "Why, Why, Why", a song by Eddie Rabbitt from Songs from Rabbittland, 1998
- "Why, Why, Why", a song by Underworld, a B-side of the single "Rez", 1993
- "Why? Why? Why? (Is It So Hard)", a song by Paul Revere & the Raiders from The Spirit of '67, 1966

== See also ==
- Why (disambiguation)
