= Wye station =

A wye station is a station located at a railway wye or junction, and may refer to:

== England ==
- Wye railway station, in Kent, England
- Redbrook on Wye railway station, a former station in Gloucestershire, England
- Ross-on-Wye railway station, a former station in Herefordshire, England
  - Ross-on-Wye weather station, an automated weather station in Herefordshire, England
- Whitney-on-Wye railway station, a former station in Herefordshire, England
- RAF Wye, a temporary First World War Royal Air Force training airfield in Kent, England

== Wales ==
- Glasbury-on-Wye railway station, a former station in Powys, Wales
- Hay-on-Wye railway station, a former station in Powys, Wales
- Newbridge on Wye railway station, a former station in Powys, Wales

== See also ==
- Triangle station (disambiguation)
