= Miller's House =

Historic house in Maryland, United States

- U.S. National Register of Historic Places
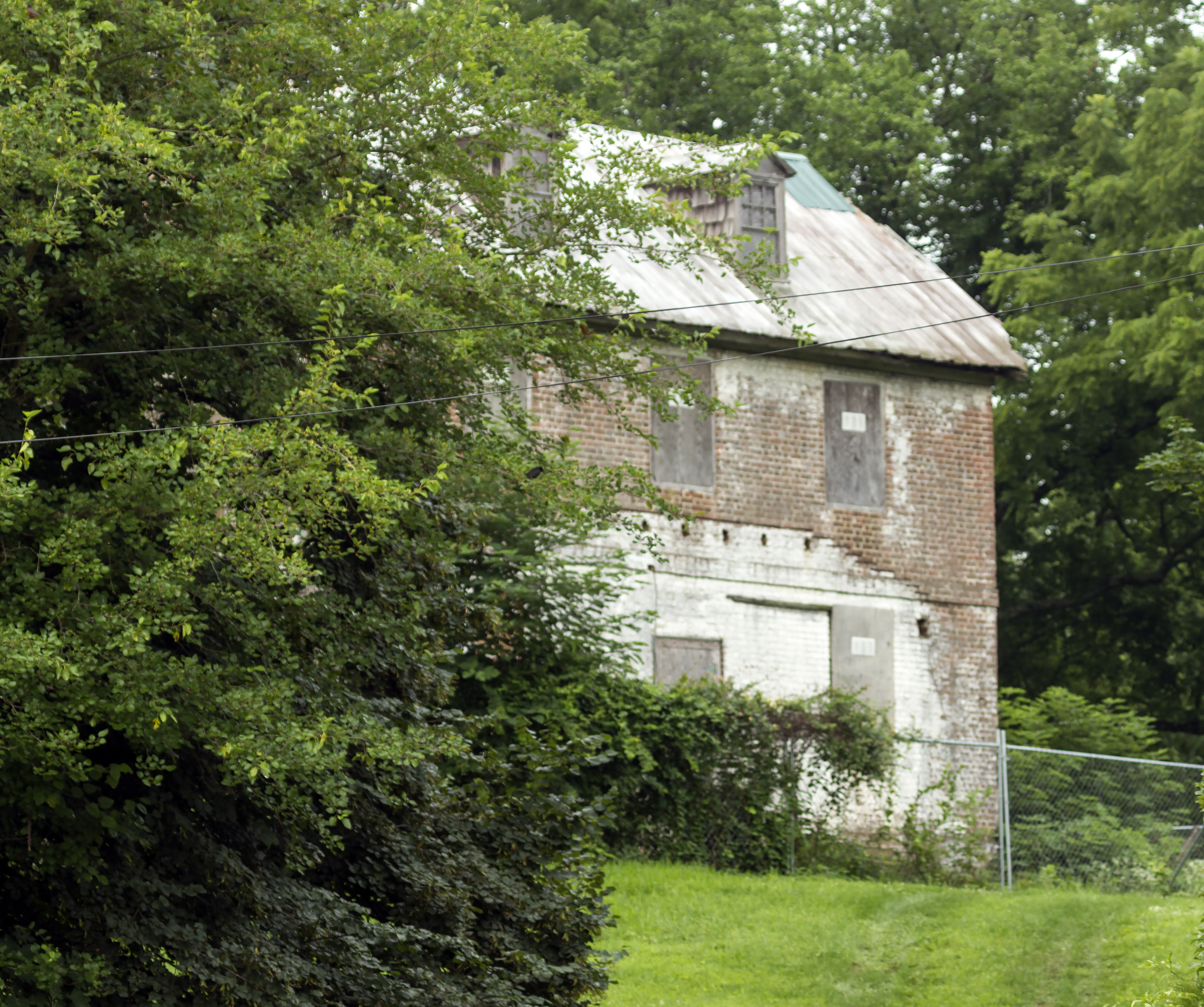
- Miller's House in 2015

- Location within Maryland Location within the United States
- Location: Old Wye Mills Rd., near Wye Mills, Maryland
- Coordinates: 38°43′58″N 76°5′22″W
- Area: 1.8 acres (0.73 ha)
- Built: c. 1770
- Built by: Edward Lloyd III
- Architectural style: Georgian
- NRHP reference No.: 10001038
- Added to NRHP: December 17, 2010

The Miller's House is a historic house on Old Wye Mills Road in Talbot County near Wye Mills, Maryland. The 2 1/2-story brick building was built c. 1770 by Edward Lloyd III, the owner of Wye Mill, for the miller to live in. The house has three bays, with a central door and chimneys set in the outer walls. The house was built at a time when Talbot County's agricultural base was gradually shifting from tobacco to grain crops, and the Lloyds probably built the house to attract and retain skilled millers.

The house was listed on the National Register of Historic Places in 2010.

As of 2025 the house was owned by the Cloverfields Preservation Foundation, which has stabilized its condition and is studying options for restoration.

== See also ==
- National Register of Historic Places listings in Talbot County, Maryland
