= Wilton (Wye Mills, Maryland) =

Historic house in Maryland, United States

- U.S. National Register of Historic Places
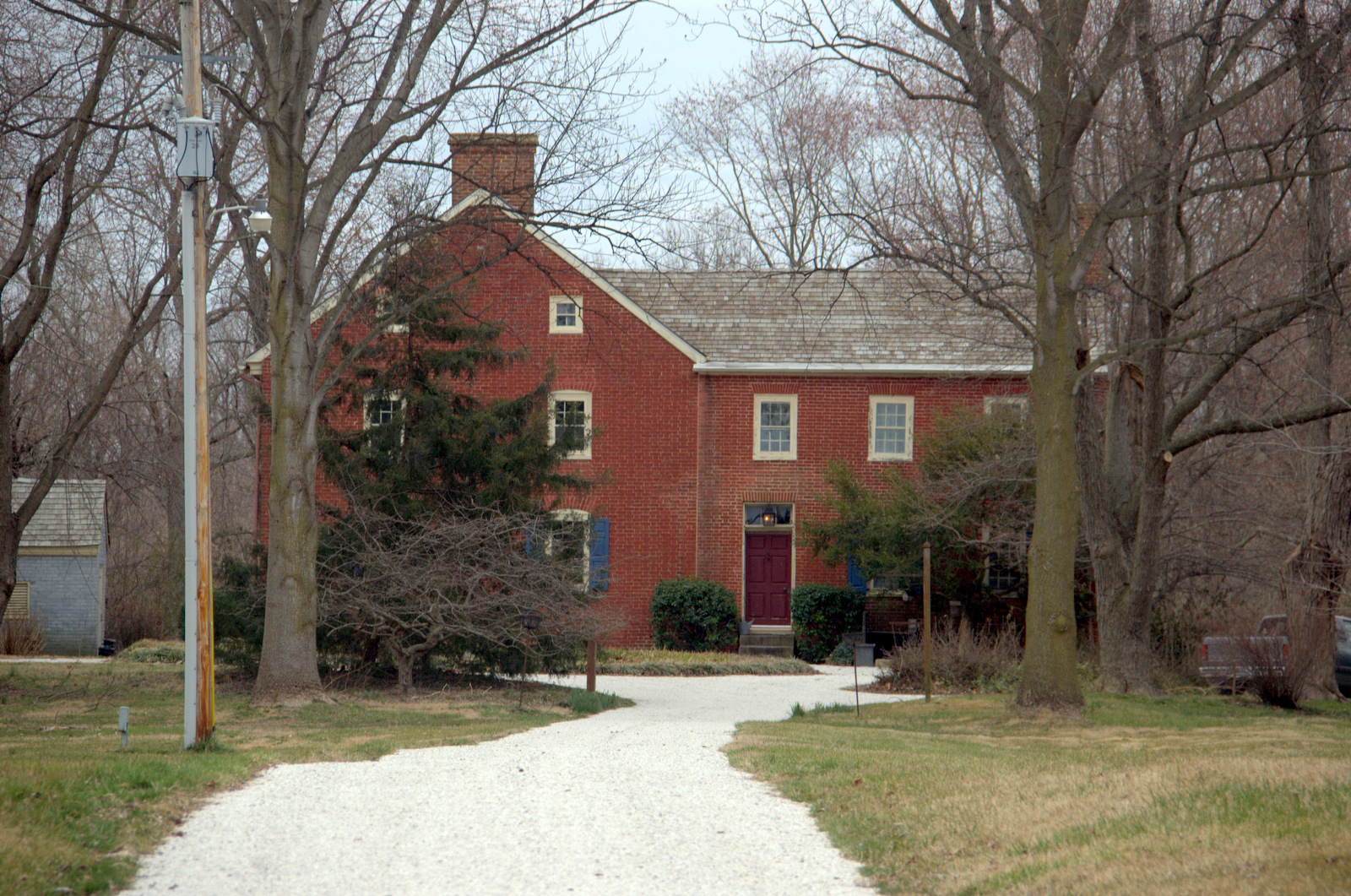

- Location within Maryland Location within the United States
- Location: Wye Mills Centreville Road (MD 662), Wye Mills, Maryland
- Coordinates: 38°56′58″N 76°4′37″W
- Area: 5 acres (2.0 ha)
- Built: 1749; 277 years ago
- Built by: Edward Lloyd, III; Joseph George
- NRHP reference No.: 77001506
- Added to NRHP: December 12, 1977

Wilton is a historic home located at Wye Mills, Queen Anne's County, Maryland. It consists of the original brick structure, built between 1749 and 1770, which is a three-bay, 2 1/2-story block, approximately 22 by 26 feet (7 by 8 m). About 1800 a major Flemish bond brick addition was made to the house.

It was listed on the National Register of Historic Places in 1977.
