= Why (Canadian band) =

Canadian Alternative Rock band

WHY
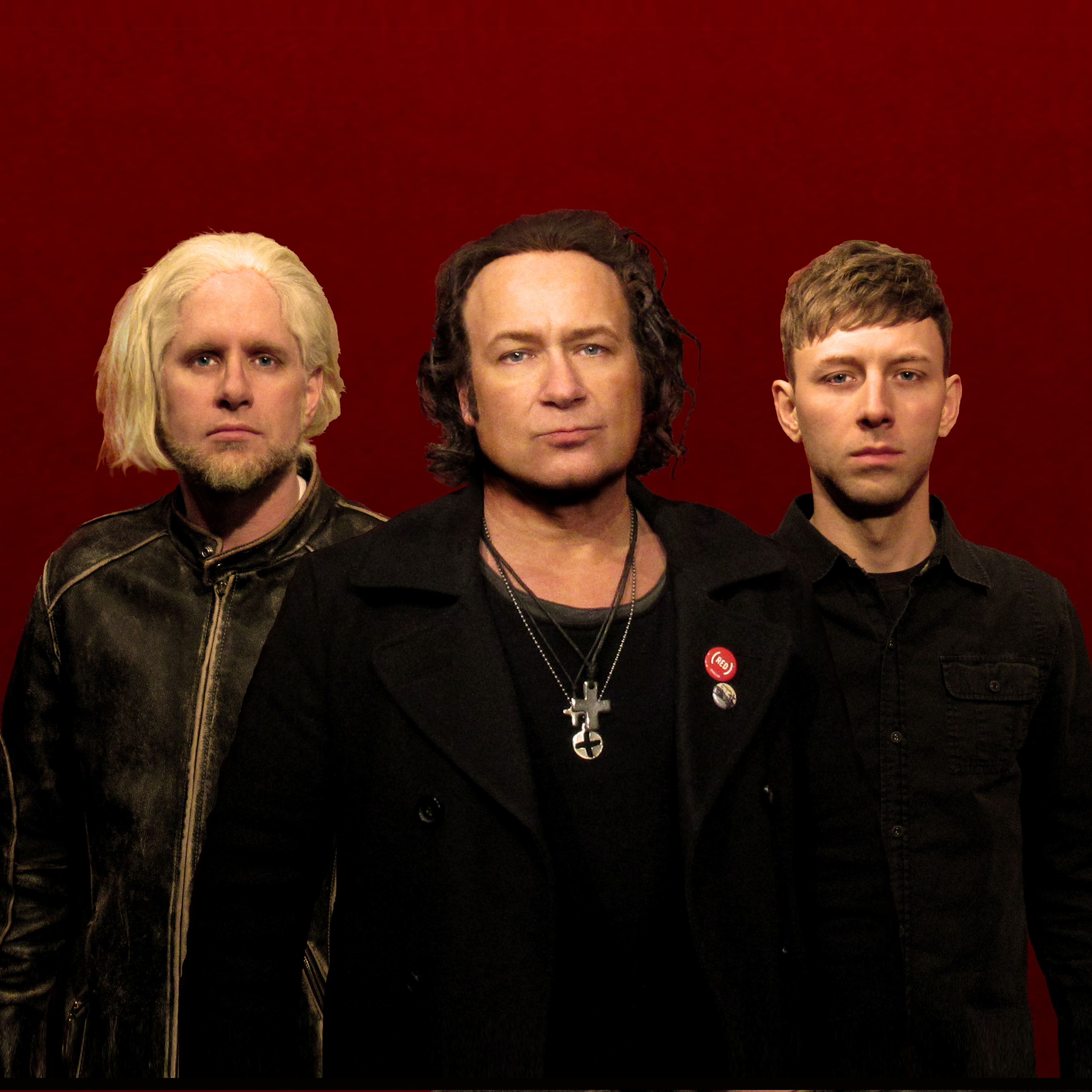

Background information
- Origin: Winnipeg, Manitoba, Canada
- Genre: Rock
- Years active: 1995–present
- Members: Brian Cook; Dave Bergmuller; Jeremy Dell
- Website: www.whytheband.com

WHY is a Canadian alternative rock band from Winnipeg, Manitoba.

Formed in 1995, WHY released its first album The Naked Soul. WHY had two singles from the album Red (2007), "The Surface" and "Red". The latter song was song of the year on Winnipeg radio station KICK FM. Their most recent album was Despite All Of The Darkness (2019), with singles "Repair The Breach", "Not The End", "Slivers". WHY released single "Calloused Heart" (2022) (from forthcoming album) followed by their recent single "Soul Declares" (2024). WHY have just released an EP Soul Declares (single mixes) featuring 2 versions of the single, 2 remixes by WATERMARK and the single "Calloused Heart". WHY have played multiple festivals and venues in support of their releases.

== Origins ==
The name "WHY" was created by lead singer Brian Cook.

As Cook explained,

I was watching a TV special on John Lennon around 1992, and there was a part filmed the day he died and fans were all around his and Yoko's New York apartment with candles and signs, and one sign just said "WHY". No question mark, just three capital letters, and I thought, "That's the most used word in our troubled world." Henry Thoreau said, "Why is the beginning of knowledge", so it seemed right for a band with so many questions.

== History ==
WHY released their first album The Naked Soul in 1994 and followed it up with The Rise and Fall of the Question Mark (2002). After playing shows in support of Question Mark, the band underwent a line-up change. WHY's next album, The Lazarus Effect, was 2005. The title song received air play in major radio markets across Canada.

In 2005, WHY began its involvement with the Make Poverty History campaign. Copies of Lazarus Effect were given out before U2 concerts in Ottawa and Montreal. Other copies were made available at Make Poverty History and online at cdbaby.com, with a portion of the proceeds from the album going directly to the charity. The single "Keep My Peace" also received a music video.

In 2007, WHY released the album Red. The single (and title track) "Red" was serviced to radio worldwide. "Red" held #1 on KICK FM's Top 40 chart for 4 weeks in a row, and was named "Song of the Year". The second single "The Surface" also charted, hitting #1 on KICK FM and #5 on The Q FM in Victoria, British Columbia. The song was named in the Winnipeg Free Press' Top 10 songs of 2007.

WHY played shows in Winnipeg supporting Red. and appeared on A Channel's The Big Breakfast. WHY was also showcased in Canadian Music Magazine that same year. In an interview with online magazine Interference, singer Brian Cook explained that Red was based on everything which the color represents: anger, joy, passion, danger, heat, for example. After Red was completed, Cook became aware of the (RED) campaign and offered the use of the single "Red" at no cost. However, the (RED) campaign never picked up the song.

Soon after the release of Red, WHY underwent another line-up change. During this period, WHY released singles "We Started Out (Somebody's Baby)" and "More or Less" as part of Ray Zahab's film Running the Sahara.

In late 2009, WHY recorded and released their hit single and video "Prisoner of Hope," which charted #6 on KICK FM and received national play.

During the summer of 2010, the "Prisoner of Hope" video was entered into a contest for an opening slot before Bon Jovi in Winnipeg. Later that same summer, the video was again entered in a contest, Winnipeg radio station Curve FM's "Rock on the Range" Contest, and made it to the finals. Prisoner of Hope was played on Curve FM and members of the band were interviewed on air.

WHY later released the single "Crash into the Future". The band has also recorded a re-mix version featuring Fresh IE. On World's AIDS Day 2010, WHY played a benefit concert at the Winnipeg Convention Center.

WHY released their fifth album, The Leap, in 2013.

WHY released album Despite All Of The Darkness (2019), with singles "Repair The Breach", "Not The End", "Slivers", "God Particle", and "The Prophet". WHY released the single "Calloused Heart" (2022) (from forthcoming album) followed by their recent single "Soul Declares" (2024). WHY have just released an EP Soul Declares (single mixes) featuring 2 versions of the single, 2 remixes by WATERMARK and the single "Calloused Heart". WHY have played multiple festivals and venues in support of their releases.

== Non-profit work ==
WHY has donated proceeds from their albums to The Global Fund, Make Poverty History, and UNICEF. WHY donated 100% of funds raised by downloads of "Prisoner of Hope," from cdbaby.com and iTunes to UNICEF for relief for the earthquake in Haiti. UNICEF featured the video for "Prisoner of Hope" on its website, under "Featured Videos."

WHY where invited by Bono's ONE Campaign to film a performance of an iconic protest song as a part of the Agit8, for the G8 to draw attention to extreme poverty. WHY covered the Rolling Stones' song "Gimme Shelter". Why's performance was featured on ONE's international site, and footage from WHY's performance was featured in the Official ONE trailer. Why were the only Canadian rock band asked to participate.

WHY's music has been featured on the websites of the charities Impossible 2 Possible and WaterCan, in fundraising efforts for OXFAM and UNICEF, and on Brad Pitt's MySpace page. In 2013, WHY released the album The Leap. In 2019, the band released the album Despite All Of The Darkness (title taken from Bishop Desmond Tutu quote). In 2022, the "Calloused Heart" single was released. In 2023, the "Soul Declares" single was released. In 2024, the Soul Declares (single mixes) EP was released and received 225,000 plus streams on Spotify. WHY headlined Kleefeld Honey Festival in the summer of 2023. The band headlined The Winnipeg FRINGE FESTIVAL (Main Stage) for 2 nights the summer of 2024.

== Band members ==
=== Current members ===
- Brian Cook (lead vocals)
- Jeremy Dell (guitar)
- Dave Bergmuller (drums)
- Mandy Peters (bass)

== Discography ==
=== Albums ===
- Despite All Of The Darkness (2019)
- The Leap (2013)
- Red (2007)
- Lazarus Effect (2005)
- The Rise And Fall of the Question Mark (2001)

=== EPs ===
- Soul Declares (Single Mixes)
- Suddenly Bang (1998)

=== Singles ===
- "Soul Declares (Radio Edit)" (2024)
- "Soul Declares (WATERMARK Energy Drink Remix)" (2024)
- "Soul Declares" (2023)
- "Calloused Heart (Radio Edit)" (2022)
- "Slivers" (2021)
- "Calloused Heart" (2021)
- "The Prophet" (2019)
- "God Particle" (2018)
- "Can't Stand Your Kids" (2018)
- "The Comeback" (2018)
- "Repair The Breach" (2017)
- "Joy Is Louder" (2016)
- "I Heard The Bells On Christmas Day" (2015)
- "Can't Everyday Be Like Christmas" (2010)
- "Prisoner of Hope" (2010)
- "Happy on Purpose" (2010)
- "Can't Everyday Be Like Christmas?" (2006)
- "I Heard the Bells on Christmas Day" (2005)
