= Old Wye Church =

Historic church in Maryland, US

- U.S. National Register of Historic Places
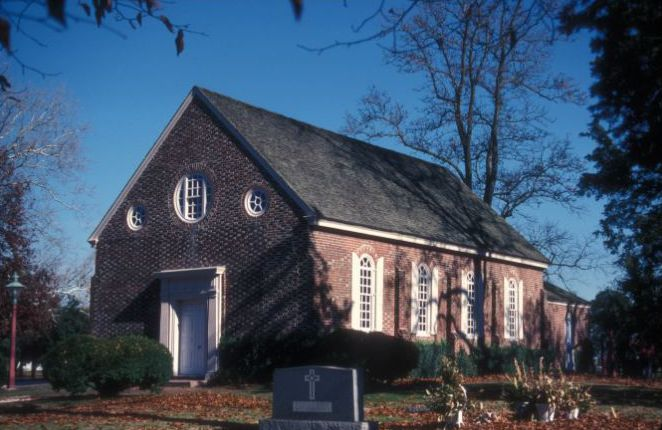

- Location within Maryland Location within the United States
- Location: Queenstown-Easton Rd., Wye Mills, Maryland
- Coordinates: 38°56′11″N 76°4′48″W
- Area: 3.5 acres (1.4 ha)
- Built: 1717-1721
- Built by: Elbert, William
- NRHP reference No.: 84001888
- Added to NRHP: August 9, 1984

Old Wye Church is a historic Episcopal church at Wye Mills, Talbot County, Maryland. It is a one-story, gable-roofed, rectangular brick structure originally constructed in 1717–21. It was extensively renovated in 1854 and restored to its 18th-century appearance in 1947–49. It embodies the distinctive characteristics of Georgian Anglican architecture in its brick construction, semicircular-arched window openings, shouldered buttresses, rectangular plan, and simple massing.

It was listed on the National Register of Historic Places in 1984.
