= Wye Bridge (disambiguation) =

Wye Bridge is a section of the Severn Bridge, the first road bridge built over the Severn Estuary which now carries the M48 motorway.

Wye Bridge may also refer:

== Bridges across the River Wye ==
- Old Wye Bridge, Chepstow
- Wye Bridge, Hereford, a Grade I listed bridge in Herefordshire
- Wye Bridge, Monmouth

== Bridges elsewhere ==
- a bridge in Wye, Kent

== See also ==
- List of crossings of the River Wye
