= Wye Mills, Maryland =

Unincorporated community in Maryland, United States

- Unincorporated community
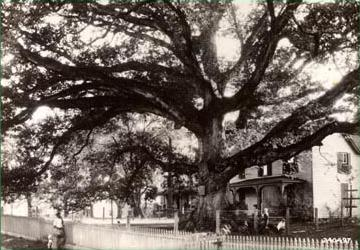
- The Wye Oak, the largest wye oak tree ever, in September 1929.

- Location within Maryland Location within the United States
- Coordinates: 38°56′28″N 76°04′50″W
- Country: United States
- State: Maryland
- County: Talbot
- Elevation: 20 ft (6.1 m)
- Time zone: UTC-5 (Eastern (EST))
  - Summer (DST): UTC-4 (EDT)
- ZIP code: 21679
- Area codes: 410, 443, and 667
- GNIS feature ID: 591615

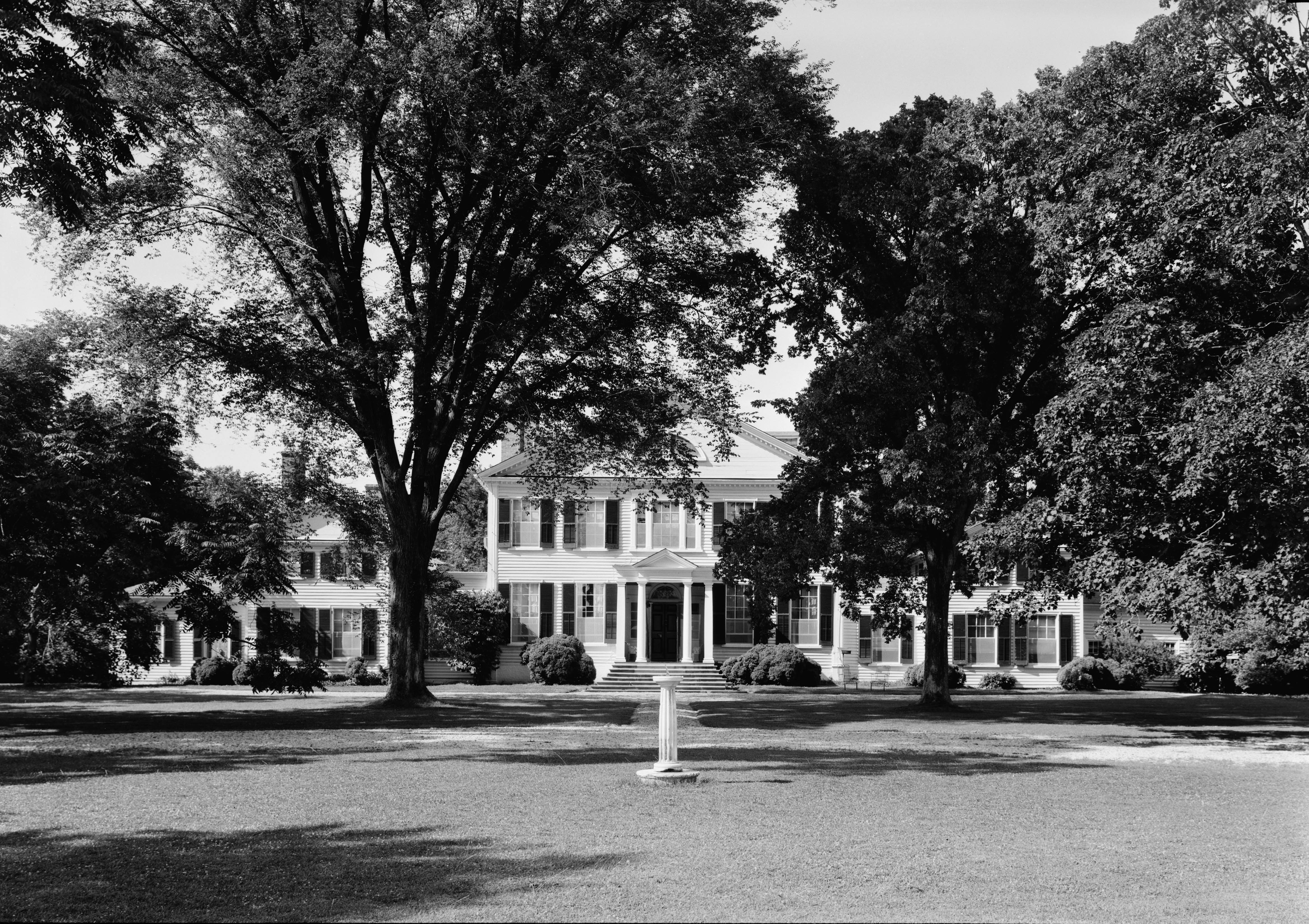
The Wye House, which is on the National Register of Historic Places.

Wye Mills is an unincorporated community in Talbot County, Maryland, United States, located at an altitude of 20 feet (6.1 m). Wye Mills is located at the intersection of Maryland routes 404 and 662, just south of the Queen Anne's County border.

== Notable landmarks ==
Wye Mills is the home of the Wye Mill which has been in nearly continuous operation since 1682. Today, it houses a museum in addition to its mill operations.

The Wye Oak (Maryland's honorary state tree, which was destroyed on June 6, 2002, by a severe thunderstorm), was located in Wye Mills.

The Old Wye Church or St. Luke's is the only Anglican church that is dated back to the 18th century in Talbot County. The church opened in 1712.

The Wye House is a plantation mansion listed on the National Register of Historic Places, dating back to between 1780 and 1790. Also listed are the Old Wye Church, Miller's House, and Wilton.

The town also harbors Maryland's first regional community college, Chesapeake College.

== Historical events ==
=== Wye Accords ===
After the failure of the Oslo Accords of 1993 to resolve the Israeli–Palestinian conflict, former President Bill Clinton held a summit in Wye Mills in October 1998. Both King Hussein of Jordan and Palestinian President Yasser Arafat attended the summit. Several issues were settled; however, some of the main issues, such as boundaries, were left unresolved and remained sources of conflict.

=== Elián González ===
For a short time, Elián González and his family resided in Wye Mills during the Elián González affair of 2000. González was at the center of a controversy involving parental custody and Cuban-American relations. After Elián was reunited with his father, the two were sheltered from the media at the remote Wye River Plantation while other relatives attempted to acquire visitation rights and the legal battle intensified.
