= Chesapeake College =

Community college in Wye Mills, Maryland, U.S.

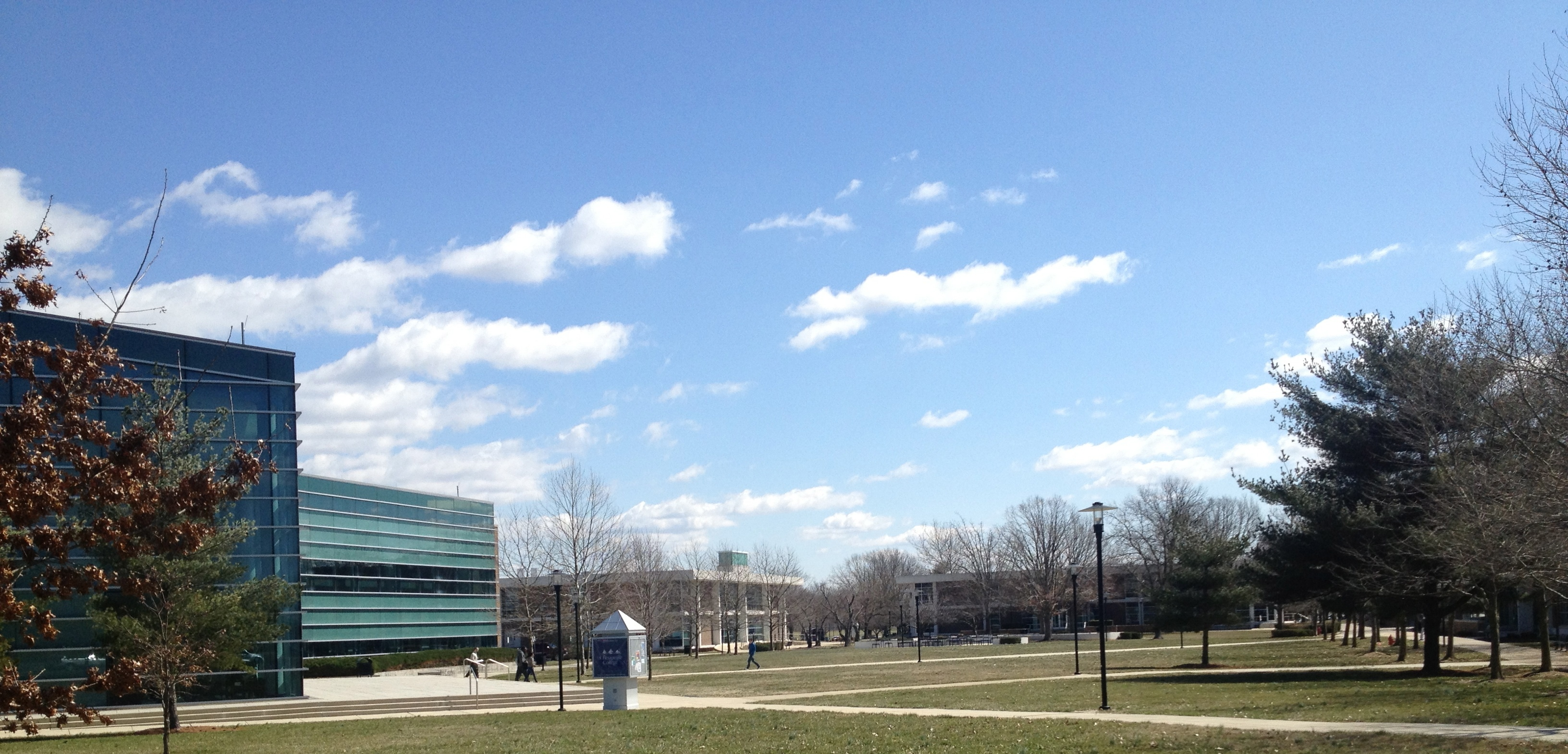
- Chesapeake College Campus
- Type: Public community college
- Established: 1965
- President: Clifford P. Coppersmith
- Academic staff: 177
- Administrative staff: 121
- Students: 2,660
- Location: Wye Mills, Maryland, United States; 38.951929°N 76.081227°W
- Campus: Rural 170-acre Main Campus
- Colors: navy, sea green, and sky blue
- Mascot: Skipjack
- Website: www.chesapeake.edu

Chesapeake College is a public community college with its main campus in Wye Mills, Maryland, and a satellite campus in Cambridge. It was the first regional community college in the state and serves the five Mid-Shore counties: Caroline, Dorchester, Kent, Queen Anne's, and Talbot.

== History ==
Nestled between corn fields and Route 50 in the Eastern Shore's tiny town of Wye Mills on December 22, 1965, the State Board of Education in Maryland adopted the Resolution 1965-66 and created Maryland's first regional community college, Chesapeake College. This college served four mid-shore counties of Caroline, Kent, Queen Anne's, and Talbot county. The college's mission was to help those who might not otherwise have the opportunity to earn a college degree.

On January 13, 1966, Chesapeake College had its first meeting of the board of trustees to elect officers and to discuss the name of the college. The Board voted William Sylvester for chair, Robert F. Irwin for vice chair of the board and chair of the college site committee, John T. Harrison for secretary, and A. Orrell Saulsbury Jr. for treasurer. After electing officers, the board of trustees voted to name the college "Chesapeake College" after considering "Eastern Shore Community College," "Mid-Shore Community College," and "Chesapeake Community College." On March 30, 1966, the Board of Trustees offered Dr. George Silver the presidency of Chesapeake College. Silver took the offer and told the Wilmington (DE) Morning News, "It'll be my job to take the dream of the four counties and put it into brick and mortar."

Finally, in January 1966 Chesapeake College's first four students, each from a different county, were officially admitted to the college. All were graduating high school seniors. On September 1, 1967, Chesapeake College opened its doors to a class of 258 evening students. These classes were operated out of Queen Anne's County High School after the high school students had finished their school day. September 10, 1967 marked the ground breaking ceremonies for the new campus. By May 11, 1969, Chesapeake College had its first graduating class.

== Facilities and buildings ==
Chesapeake College's main campus sits on 170-acres. The main campus has 12 buildings. The Cambridge Campus is housed in one building in downtown Cambridge, Maryland. The main buildings on the main campus are named after the five upper Eastern Shore counties.

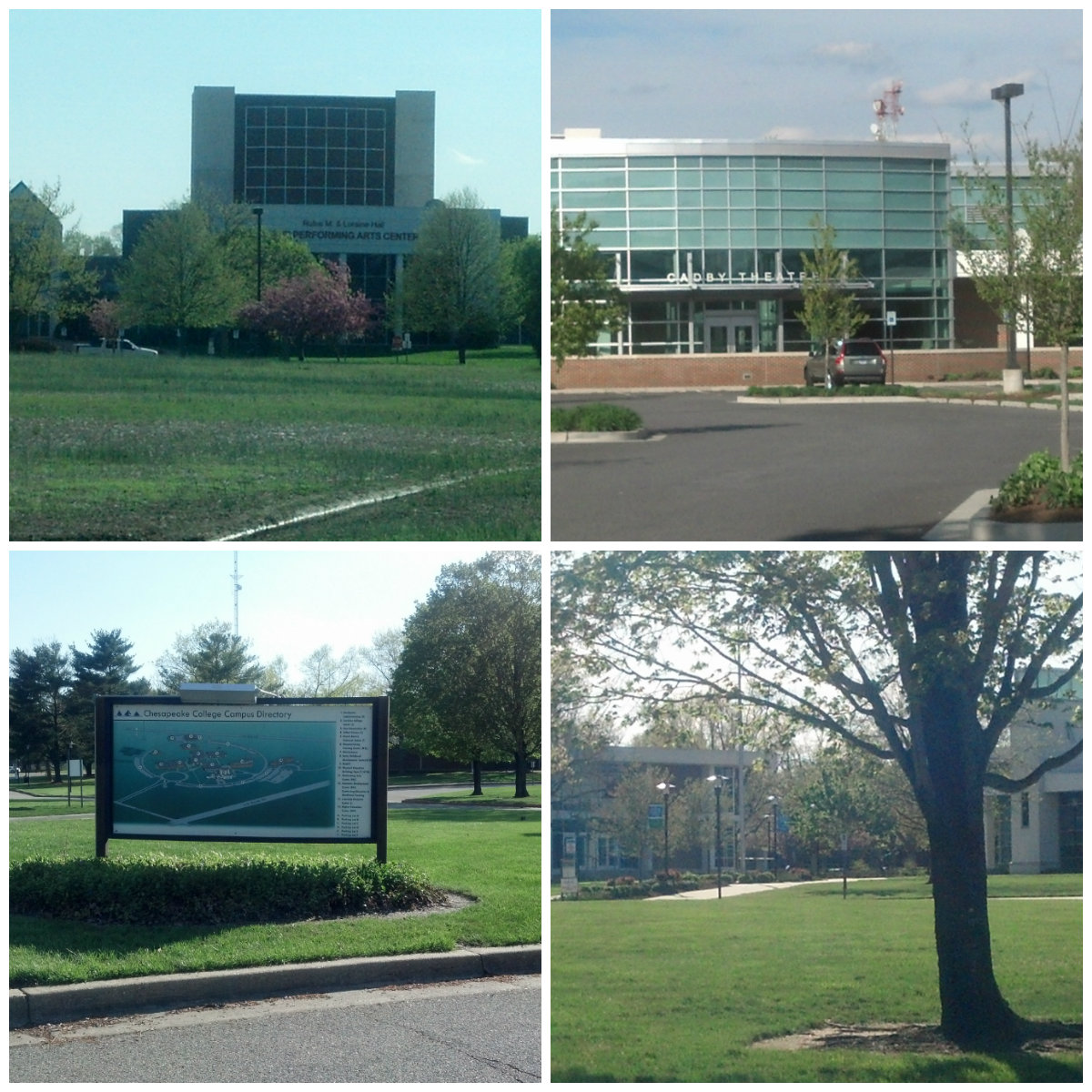
Chesapeake College Campus

=== Caroline College Center ===
The Caroline College Center houses the Bookstore, the Skipjack Cafe, the Student Government office, Student Life offices, Career Services offices, and faculty offices. The center was completely renovated in 2006 to better serve the growing needs of the college.

=== Dorchester Administration Building ===
The Dorchester Administration Building houses the offices of Academic Advising, Admissions, the Alumni Association, the Business Office, Financial Aid, Human Resources, Institutional Advancement, IT, For All Seasons office, Registration, and Student Retention Services, including the Dean of Students. The building also houses the offices of the President and Vice Presidents of the college. Original construction of the Dorchester Building began in 1966, and the building was completely renovated in 2003.

=== Chesapeake Child Care Resource Center and Public Safety ===
This building was the Chesapeake College Early Childhood Development Center (ECDC), a licensed childcare center with the purpose of serving those parents of children 3 through 7 years of age who were students, staff, faculty at the college as well as parents throughout the community. In addition to functioning as a licensed childcare facility, the center also served as a learning site for students enrolled in the Early Childhood Development program.

Currently located in the building is the Chesapeake Child Care Resource Center, which is one of the 12 child care resource centers in Maryland that make up the Maryland Child Care Resource Network and began start-up operations on June 1, 1999. Funding for the center is through a grant from the Maryland Department of Human Resources. Its childcare training services have included Project Right Steps since 2005.

Core Services

The sole focus of the Chesapeake Child Care Resource Center is to foster and provide an array of supports to the local community, which includes the college's five service-area counties Caroline, Dorchester, Kent, Queen Anne, and Talbot.

Services provided to the Upper Shore Community from Chesapeake Child Care Resource Center include:

- Helping parents to find and evaluate child care
- Training for parents and child care professionals
- Technical assistance to improve and expand child care resources
- Working with employers on work/family issues

The same building houses the campus' Public Safety officers and staff.

=== Eastern Shore Higher Education Center ===
The Eastern Shore Higher Education Center (HEC) Building was added to the campus in 2003. The facilities are utilized not only by Chesapeake College but also by other local universities and colleges for undergraduate and graduate programs. The Center provides space for business functions and Continuing Education courses and programs.

Gratz College, University of Maryland University College, Stevenson University, and Notre Dame of Maryland University have offered courses at the center, while the current participating higher education institutions are Salisbury University, University of Maryland Eastern Shore, La Salle University, and Bowie State University.

=== Kent Humanities Building ===
The Kent Humanities Building houses the Cadby Theatre and Lobby, lecture classrooms, and faculty offices. The building is named after Kent County, which was established on the Eastern Shore of Maryland in 1642. The Kent Humanities Building was originally built in 1969 and was renovated in 2010. Per renovation, the building now houses the Cadby Theatre, which can seat 100 occupants and is equipped with lighting, sound, and audio/visual equipment. This smaller of two campus theatres was named after Louise Cadby, who served as the college's first drama instructor from 1968 to 1985.

=== Learning Resource Center ===
Chesapeake College's Learning Resource Center provides various resources for faculty, students, and members of the community, including the campus's Academic Support Services.

Library

The Library helps to meet the information needs of Chesapeake's students and faculty as well as members of the local community by providing over 22,600 photos, books, films, and recordings. Chesapeake's library provides students with more than 300,000 e-resources, including peer reviewed e-books, journals, periodicals, and subject-specific databases. The library is equipped with numerous computers and study spaces for both individuals and groups. Assistance for students is available through the library in person, online, or by phone.

Academic Support Center

Located on the first floor of the Learning Resource Center, the Academic Support Center provides students and faculty with assistance in most academic subjects, especially mathematics, science, and writing across the disciplines.

Tutoring

The Academic Support Center provides tutoring, both individually and in groups, for students on campus by faculty, professional staff, and peer consultants. Tutoring is available for most academic disciplines with special services provided for every step of the writing process. Services include sample papers and handouts. Special hours are dedicated each semester for tutoring services.

Supplemental Instruction

The center also provides supplemental instruction (SI) for students in courses that are considered to be difficult. Supplemental instruction is available to students currently enrolled in the targeted course. SI courses are subject to change each semester.

Project Mainstay

The Academic Support Center housed Project Mainstay, a federally funded TRIO Student Support Services program designed to help eligible students stay in school, graduate, and transfer to a four-year institution. In order for students to be eligible for that program they had to meet one of the following criteria: be a first-generation college student, be overcoming a physical or learning disability, or come from a low-income family. Project Mainstay provided students with individualized tutoring one hour a week for each enrolled course, financial aid, time management, and test anxiety assistance, transfer and career opportunities and much more. In 2015 Chesapeake College transitioned from Project Mainstay to the classic TRiO Student Support Services program, designed to guide eligible students to successfully complete their classes, graduate, and then continue their education at a 4-year college.

Testing Center

The Testing Center, located in the Learning Resource Center, has weekday hours in which the center administers the placement tests for those registering for courses. The center also administers proctored exams, make-up exams, and online course exams. Photo identification is needed in order to take tests and individuals must arrive two hours prior to the center closing.

=== Health Professions and Athletics Center ===
The Physical Education Building housed the gym, fitness center, pool, locker rooms, and faculty and staff offices. The Physical Education Building was renovated as part of a 2012-2014 project to move all health professions instruction to the main campus in a new Health Professions and Athletics Center.

The five counties the college serves—Caroline, Talbot, Queen Anne's, Kent, and Dorchester—share a $9 million contribution to the new Health Professions and Athletics Center. In a 3–2 vote to approve funding, Caroline County and Dorchester County voted against the contribution. The state awarded the college $27 million to fund the project, or 75% of the cost, towards construction, leaving the other counties to pay 25%. Each county pays a debt of about $120,000 a year for the next 20 years to fund the project.

As a result of the controversial vote, Caroline County administrators have said that they will no longer support funding to Chesapeake College, which causes the other Mid-Shore counties that also make contributions to have to make a permanent increase in their budget. Jeff Ghrist, then Vice President and spokesperson for Caroline County, argued that the county would be unable to contribute $200,000 to the $1 million expense for an emergency roof replacement to another campus building.

=== Queen Anne's Technical Building ===
The Queen Anne's Technical Building features computer lab classrooms, a large instruction classroom, and faculty and staff offices. The building was originally constructed in 1969. Although the building has not been officially renovated, it does house up-to-date computers, software, and a distance learning classroom. The Queen Anne's County Technical Building was named after Queen Anne's County, which was founded in 1706 in honor of Queen Anne who ruled Great Britain and Ireland from 1702 to 1714. Queen Anne's was the first English settlement in Maryland under a 1631 patent from the king of England.

=== Talbot Science Building ===
The Talbot Sciences Building houses the office of the Dean of Liberal Arts and Science, faculty offices, science lab classrooms, and large instruction classrooms. The Talbot Sciences Building was one of the original buildings on campus and was renovated in 2009. The Talbot Science Building is named after Talbot County, which was established in 1661 in honor of Lady Grace Talbot.

=== Todd Performing Arts Center ===
The Todd Performing Arts Center (TPAC) building houses Todd Performing Arts Center Theatre and Lobby, box offices, the office of the executive director, faculty offices, and a training/catering kitchen.

=== Cambridge Center ===
The Cambridge campus of Chesapeake College provides educational opportunities to those who live or work in the mid or lower Eastern Shore area. The Cambridge Center provides most of the services a student would need on a daily basis from a higher learning institution. The location of the Cambridge Center in downtown Cambridge gives students an alternative to having to travel to Wye Mills to attend a Chesapeake College course.

The Cambridge Center houses a main office with full service staff, where students can apply for admission, register for or drop classes, make payments, learn about financial aid, and meet with advisors. The Cambridge Center facilities include a computer lab, testing center, tutoring center, multiple classrooms, and bookstore. The Cambridge Center offers a wide array of required courses and electives for students in many different majors.

=== Chinese Pavilion ===
Representatives from Suzhou, China joined Queen Anne's County officials for the dedication of a pavilion on the campus of Chesapeake College on Monday, May 16, 2011.

A gift from the people of Suzhou to the people of Queen Anne's County, the Canglang Pavilion was constructed by Chinese artisans. It is located next to the pond near the campus main entrance, between the College's main buildings and athletic fields.

== Academics ==
Chesapeake College offers associate degree programs, certificates, and letters of recognition. It is accredited by the Middle States Commission on Higher Education. It also has an honors program.

== Athletics ==
=== Sports ===
- Men's Basketball
- Women's Basketball
- Baseball
- Softball
- Men's Soccer
- Women's Volleyball

=== Stuart M. Bounds Fitness Center ===
Chesapeake College opened the Stuart M. Bounds Fitness Center in August 2008 after a major expansion and renovation of the college's fitness facilities.

== School mascot ==
In August 2009, Cap'n Jack was introduced as the official Chesapeake College Skipjacks mascot. Cap'n Jack is a green parrot pirate who proudly wears the white and blue school colors on his pirate attire and sports a grand pirate hat and an eye patch. Cap'n Jack is known for his appearances at community and college events and also has his own fan following on Facebook, MySpace, and Twitter where he keeps students, faculty, and the community aware of upcoming events at Chesapeake College.

== Alumni ==
- Richard F. Colburn - Maryland State Senator, R-37 Mid-Shore, 5th term, Chairman of the Eastern Shore Delegation Committee, Town Manager of Federalsburg
- Wheeler R. Baker - former Maryland State Delegate
- Matt Rosendale - Montana politician

== Alliances with other institutions ==
=== Maryland Association of Community Colleges (MACC) ===
Maryland's 16 community colleges provide early college access programs for high school students, giving them the opportunity to accelerate their pursuit of a college degree or certificate.

According to the Maryland Association of Community Colleges (MACC) 2022 Databook, for the Fall semester of 2021 Chesapeake College had a total of 1,738 credit students, 413 were enrolled full-time and 1,325 were enrolled part-time. For the fiscal year 2021, Chesapeake College awarded a total of 246 degrees, of which 135 were transfer degrees, and 111 were career degrees. For the fiscal year of 2021, Chesapeake College made a 7% increase over the previous year in career degrees awarded.

=== The Articulation System for Transferring Courses from One Maryland University or College to Another (ARTSYS) ===
Chesapeake College participates in ARTSYS, a computerized data information system that helps ease the transfer of students from Maryland community colleges to all institutions within the University of Maryland system. ARTSYS allows students and advisors at the institutions to ascertain the transferability status of any community college course. It indicates whether the course is transferable and, if so, indicates the receiving institution's equivalent course number or applicability towards elective credits. It also indicates the general education area(s), at both the sending and receiving institutions, applicable to the course.

== Hospital services ==
Together with Memorial Hospital at Easton in Easton, MD, Chesapeake College offers various Allied Health programs. The Allied Health facilities, located at Memorial Hospital, include a computer lab, four classrooms, one of which is for distant learning, and a lab for hands on learning, along with many offices which serve as a "full service center with registration and business office functions", and a medical library. In the near future the hospital plans to move its location. In preparation for this move the Chesapeake College's physical education building will be renovated to accommodate the new home of the Allied Health program and facilities.

== Charitable contributions ==
Many of Chesapeake College's faculty and students frequently join to donate their time and talent back to the community. Their contributions have benefited various organizations and charities that extend beyond Maryland. Additionally, the college houses the Volunteer Center, providing the space as well as staff. The central purpose of this center is to "serve as a clearinghouse for nonprofits and volunteers serving Chesapeake College's five counties".

- Katrina- When a category 5 hurricane, named Katrina, swept through the Gulf coast August 2005 causing mass destruction and casualties, Chesapeake College came together as a community and organized a variety of relief efforts.
  - Alternative Spring Break- for the last few years students have dedicated their spring break to join with the Habitat for Humanity organization in their venture to help rebuild New Orleans.
  - The Gulf Coast commitment employed several different relief efforts. For instance, the Chesapeake College Cares: Gulf Coast Disaster Relief was a 2-week operation to raise money for the communities affected by the hurricane, where they raised nearly $4000. During this time the athletic department donated money received from concessions and cookout sales, to the relief. Furthermore, the college offered student victims the opportunity to enroll in Chesapeake, free of charge, for the fall semester. The school also explored the idea of donating used computers, as well as books to colleges and libraries damaged during the storm.
- Phi Theta Kappa- held a blanket drive for Midshore Council on Family Violence in order to donate new or gently used blankets to clients of a local shelter. The honor society received 66 blankets from students and faculty of the college. Members also collected "used cell phones as part of the national Cell Phones for Soldiers project.", planted grasses at Pickering Creek and organized a trash pick up along the highway.
- Battle against Cancer- The women's volleyball team and men's soccer team raised money towards the Dig Pink Foundation and "Kick It To Cancer" campaign.
- Samaritan House- Chesapeake College students collected non perishable food items and the baseball team donated the money raised from a pancake breakfast that was held at a local restaurant, to a local Samaritan House.
