= Wye Oak =

Largest known white oak in the United States

Wye Oak State Park
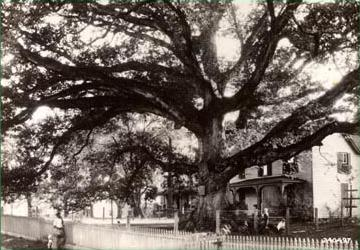
- Wye Oak, September 1929

- Location within Maryland
- Location: Wye Mills, Maryland, United States
- Coordinates: 38°56′21″N 76°04′51″W
- Area: 29 acres (12 ha)
- Elevation: 43 ft (13 m)
- Established: 2009
- Administrator: Maryland Department of Natural Resources
- Designation: Maryland state park
- Website: Official website

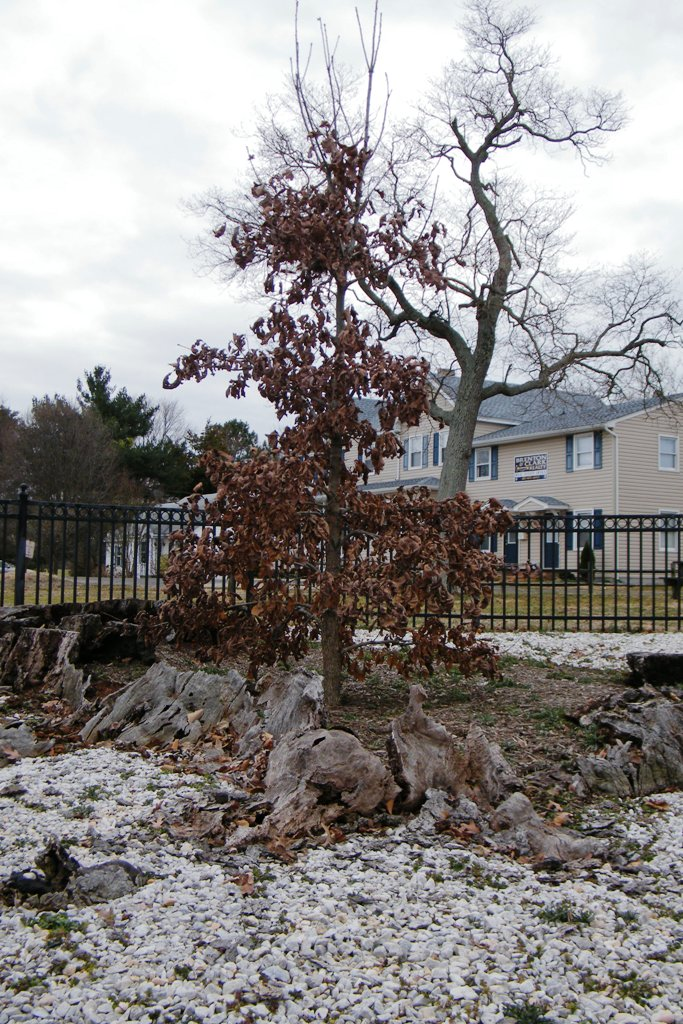
The remains of the Wye Oak supporting its clone in 2011.

The Wye Oak was the largest white oak tree in the United States and the State Tree of Maryland from 1941 until its demise in 2002. Wye Oak State Park preserves the site where the revered tree stood for more than 400 years in the town of Wye Mills, Talbot County, Maryland.

The Wye Oak was believed to be over 460 years old at the time of its destruction during a severe thunderstorm on June 6, 2002. It measured 31 feet 10 inches (970 cm) in circumference of the trunk at breast height, 96 feet (29 m) high, with a crown spread of 119 feet (36 m). It is believed that the acorn that became the oak germinated around 1540. Its largest limb, estimated to weigh 35 short tons (31.5 tonnes) and six feet (1.8 meters) thick, fell earlier, on June 10, 1984. The Wye Oak was still bearing a maturing crop of acorns when it was toppled.

The Wye Oak drew public attention in 1909, when Maryland State Forester Fred W. Besley made the first official measurement of the tree. Ten years later, in 1919, it was featured in American Forestry magazine as the first tree in the American Forestry Association's "Tree Hall of Fame." The Wye Oak inspired Besley to found the Big Tree Champion Program in 1925; as a result, in 1940 the American Forestry Association named the Wye Oak one of its first National Champion Trees. By the time of its destruction 62 years later, only one other tree named that year remained standing. The tree faced a loss of a large limb in 1956 that sparked concerns, and another limb fell in 1984 that weighed 70,280 lb (31,880 kg).

The tree fell during a heavy thunderstorm with high winds on the night of June 6, 2002. The tree's exceptionally long life has been attributed to the efforts of park managers, who applied preventive measures such as fertilizer and insecticide as well as extensive pruning, cabling, and bracing of the branches.

== State park ==
The Maryland General Assembly purchased the tree and established Wye Oak State Park in 1939. At its creation, the park was a little over an acre in size, according to Wye Oak: The History of a Great Tree by Dickson J. Preston:

[A]t 2:45 p.m. on September 20, 1939, just before the options were due to expire, the deeds transferring title to the State of Maryland were recorded at the Talbot County Courthouse in Easton. The Kinnamon and Straughn lots were identical in size: each had a frontage of 74½ feet and extended back from the road for a distance of 19 perches (a perch equals a rod, or 16½ feet, so that their depth was 313.5 feet [95.6 m]). The park thus created was about an acre and a half [sic; this actually works out to just over an acre] in size – the smallest in the state and perhaps in the nation, though not nearly as small as most people thought.

The park's current 29 acres (12 ha) protect the nearby stream valley from development. The site of the Wye Oak remains largely untouched, and the descriptive plaque placed there in 1921 remains at the site. The park also includes a one-room brick schoolhouse dating from colonial times; it is the second-oldest schoolhouse in Talbot County.

== Cloning ==
Dr. Frank Gouin, Professor Emeritus of Horticulture at the University of Maryland, College Park, impressed both by the age and size of the tree, as well as its unusual resistance to oak wilt fungus and the gypsy moth, led a successful effort to clone the Wye Oak. The first two cloned saplings were planted at Mount Vernon on April 26, 2002. Another clone was planted in the remains of the trunk of the original tree during a June 6, 2006, ceremony; a marker commemorates the event.

== Artworks ==
Upon its falling, immediate efforts were made to salvage and preserve the tree's remains. Pieces of the tree that had fallen in previous years had been used to sculpt works such as the statue of two children planting a tree located in the Tawes State Office Building in Annapolis. A very large section of the lost tree became a new desk for the Maryland governor's office. Wood distributed to artists and craftspersons was used to create carvings, sculptures, oil paintings, a three-dimensional collage, furnishings, and serving pieces; a gallery of the creations was made available online by the Department of Natural Resources. Another artist took hundreds of small leaves from the tree, preserved them and made them into jewelry issued with a certificate of authenticity as being from The Wye Oak.

== See also ==
- List of individual trees
- State Trees of the United States
- Wye Oak (band)
