= Ross-on-Wye weather station =

Weather station in Herefordshire, England

Coordinates: 51.91111°N 2.58575°W

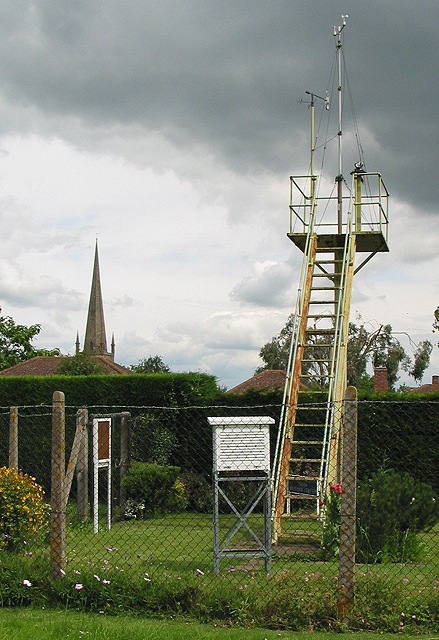
The weather station

The Ross-on-Wye weather station is a weather station, now fully automated, situated off the Walford Road in Ross-on-Wye, Herefordshire, England.

== Tradition ==
Throughout the Second World War, it was the only volunteer-run weather station to be accepted by the Met office. Every night throughout the conflict, it was the only land-locked station to be included in the shipping forecast on the World Service. The anecdotes goes that- even when in the Pacific- the soldiers from Ross would know exactly what the weather was like around at their mothers.

Clement Grant Dixon, Physics teacher, Ross Grammar School, 1970.

== History ==
Henry Southall (1836–1916), set up a station at 'The Craig, Ross' in 1859. It was in 1860, after the loss of the Royal Charter in 1859, that Robert FitzRoy (1805–1865) used the electric telegraph to transmit weather data so he might issue storm warnings and in 1861 issue weather forecasts. Importantly Ross was already operating.

Frederick James Parsons arrived in Ross in 1912 having previously had his own amateur station when a child. He met up with Southall, and established his own station at Chase Dale in the Chase, Ross. In 1914 he was made a Fellow of Royal Meteorological Society but due to the outbreak of war he joined the Herefordshire Territorials and was transferred to the Royal Engineers as one of the first five meteorologists to be in the service. The station was maintained in his absence by the landowner, Mrs Purchase. On return he continued to take daily readings until 1964 when he was 72.

From 1975 until 1985 the town was without a weather station, but on the initiative of the mayor, Arthur Clarke, it was reopened in May 1985.

More recently readings were taken by Howard Ellis, a retired chemist assisted by the husband and wife team, June and Rex Swallow. June Swallow took over the monitoring station in 1995 and continued to take readings until the Summer 2008 when she retired after 23 years. The station was semi-automated but still needed volunteers to take some readings.

In October 2017 the station was fully automated.

== Henry Southall ==
Henry Southall was a distinguished meteorologist, a Fellow of Royal Meteorological Society who served as its president. In December 1895, he read his paper on the "Floods in the West Midlands" in which he considered the great floods that had occurred on the rivers Severn, Wye, Usk and Avon. He took data from the River Wye at Ross. He used a rise of 14 feet 6 inches (4.42 m)as measure of a 'primary flood'. He wrote that all the great floods occurred in November and February, and their frequency was decreasing. This he attributed to better drainage in the lower reaches and railway embankments and bridges holding back the surge from the upper reaches. He noted that rainfall had not decreased and he had taken the readings.

The floods at Ross were in

1770 - 16 to 18 November
1795 - 11 to 12 February
1809 - 27 January (exception)
1824 - 24 November
1831 - 10 February
1852 - 8 February & 12 November
1894 - 15 November 14 feet 3 inches (4.34 m) a secondary flood.

== The station ==
The station has these instruments:

On the Ground
Thermometers

Grass & Concrete Minimum
Soil - Depth - 10 cm & 30 cm

Rain Gauge
In the Screen
Thermometers

Maximum
Minimum
Wet & Dry Bulbs

On the Tower
Wind Indicators
Sunshine Recorder
