= Wye Mill =

- U.S. National Register of Historic Places
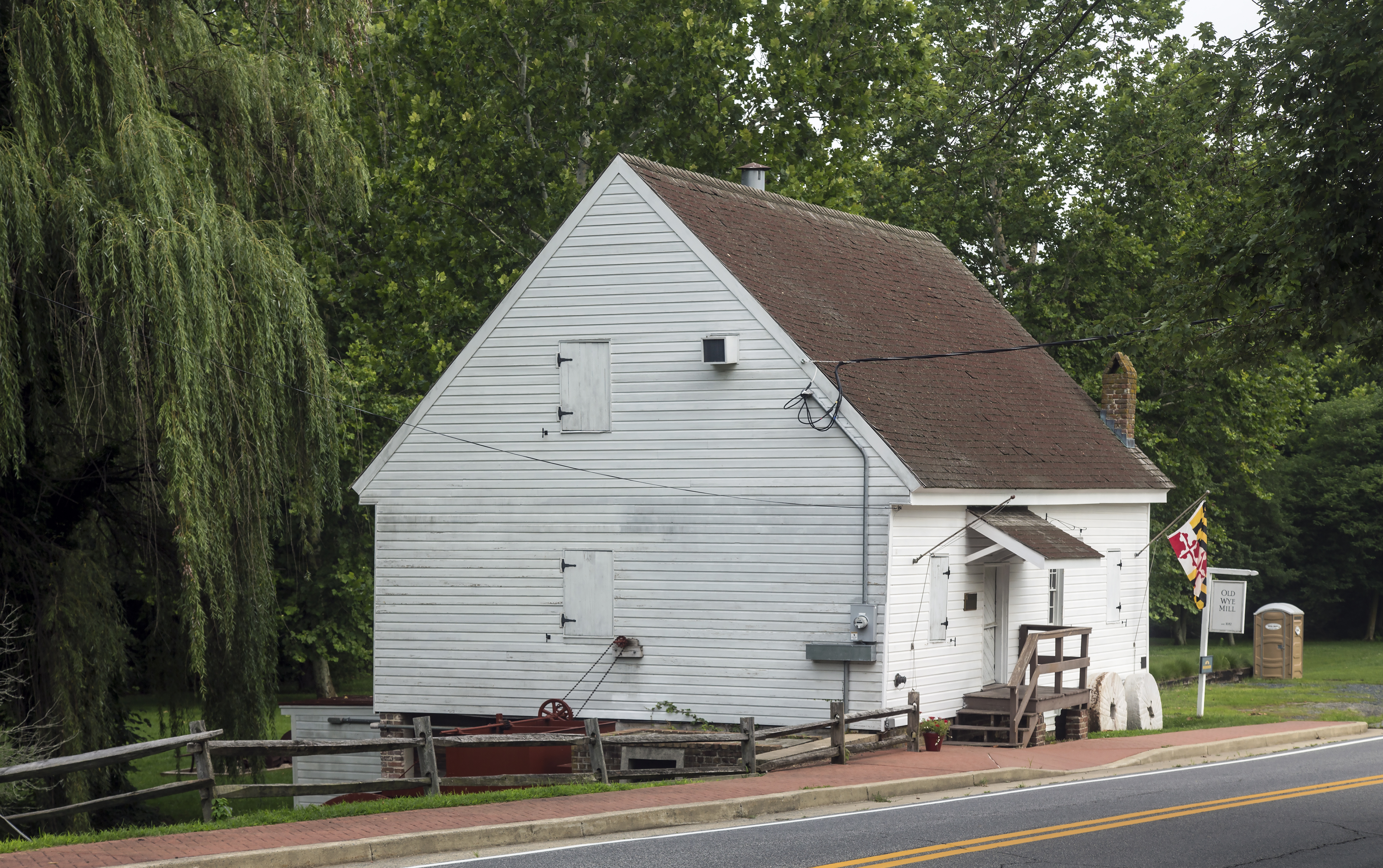
- Wye Mill in July 2015

- Location within Maryland Location within the United States
- Location: Centreville Road (MD 213) & Wye Mills Road (MD 662), Wye Mills, Maryland
- Coordinates: 38°56′29″N 76°4′53″W
- Area: 0.8 acres (0.32 ha)
- NRHP reference No.: 85000717
- Added to NRHP: April 9, 1985

The Wye Mill is the oldest continuously operated grist mill in the United States, located at Wye Mills, Queen Anne's County and Talbot County, Maryland, United States. It is the earliest industrial site on the Eastern Shore in continuous use; dating to the late 17th century. It is a wood-frame, water-powered grist mill, with a 19th-century 26 HP 10-foot-diameter (3.0 m) Fitz steel overshot wheel. The mill retains nearly all of its late-18th-century equipment. The Wye Mill was one of the first grist mills to be automated with the Oliver Evans process, which is still in use today.

The Wye Mill was listed on the National Register of Historic Places in 1985.
